= Glossary of Japanese theater =

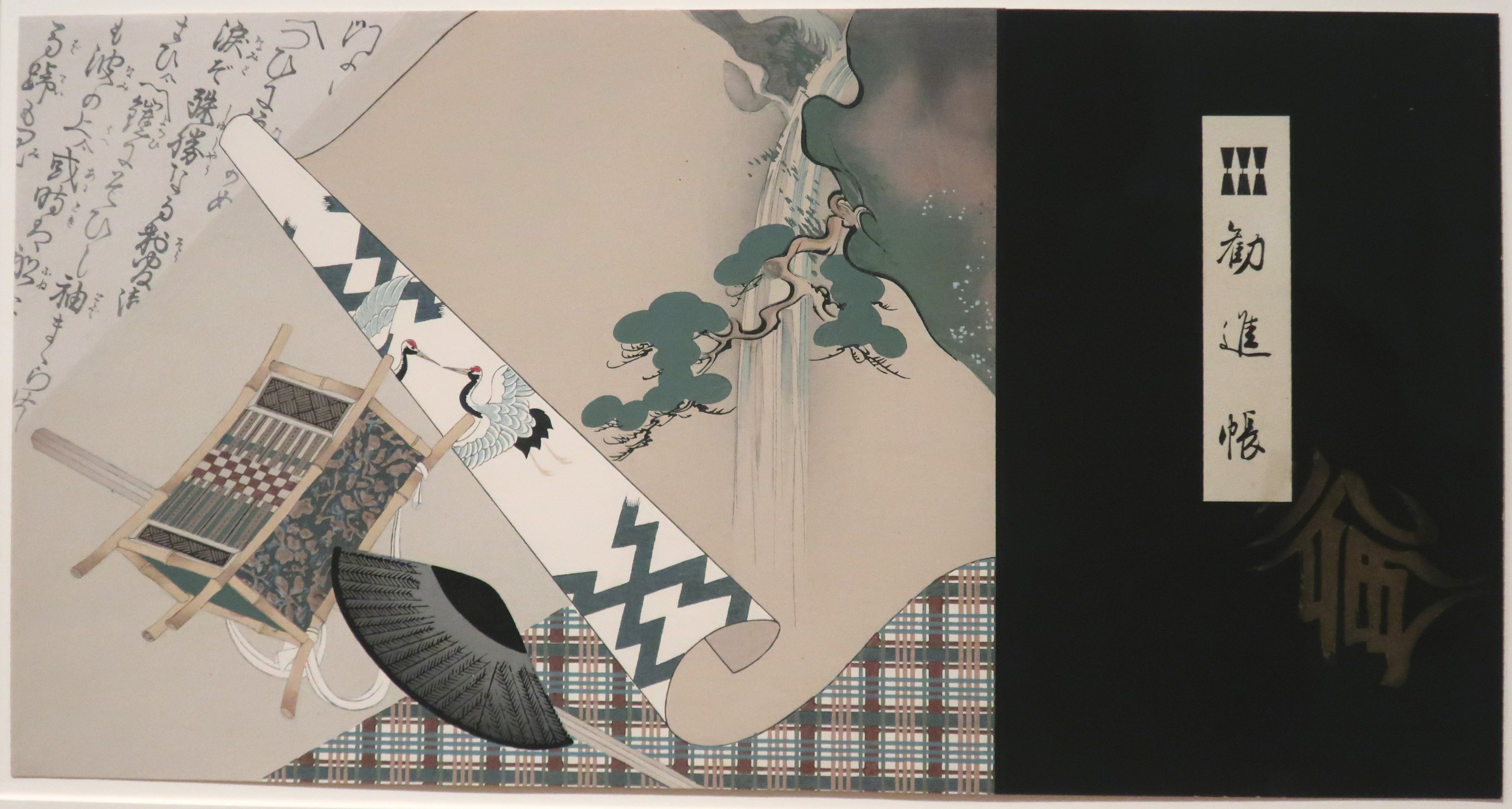
Kanjinchō from the series One Hundred Poetry Illustrations: A Collection of Multicolor Woodblock Prints by Kojima Gyokuhō, c. 1934

This glossary gives a general overview of terms related to the Japanese theater, performing arts, and dances. A concise description is given for each term; more details are given in their respective articles. The glossary does not include personalia and plays. For rarer terms not found in this glossary, see #Bibliography.

== A ==
Akobujō
A type of Noh mask (能面) representing an elderly male character, characterized by its dignified expression and architectural features. Used in plays featuring aristocratic characters or spirits.
Akuba
A role of evil woman (悪婆) in sewamono plays.
Angama
A traditional folk dance from the Yaeyama Islands of Okinawa, performed during festivals and celebrations. Features dynamic movements and distinctive local musical accompaniment.
Angura
Underground (アングラ) theater movement that emerged in Japan in the 1960s as an experimental and avant-garde form of theater. It challenged both Western-style shingeki and traditional Japanese theater forms, often performing in non-traditional spaces.
Aragoto
A rough, masculine style of kabuki acting (荒事, "rough business") characterized by exaggerated movements, bombastic speeches, and dynamic poses. Often features heroes and warriors with bold red makeup and extravagant costumes. This style was developed in Edo and is especially associated with the Ichikawa family of actors.
Aragotoshi
An actor (荒事師) playing heroes in Aragoto style.
Atari kyōgen
A popular hit play (当り狂言).
Atsuita
A thick, richly woven brocade fabric (厚板) used in kabuki costumes, particularly for male roles. Characterized by its bold patterns incorporating gold and silver thread, it typically features designs of dragons, tigers, and other powerful motifs appropriate for warrior and nobleman characters.
Awa Odori
Japan's largest dance festival (阿波踊り), held annually in Tokushima Prefecture during Obon. Features choreographed groups (ren) performing with traditional instruments including shamisen, taiko drums, and shinobue flutes. The festival originated in 1586's celebration of Tokushima Castle's completion.
Ayahashi
A type of Noh mask portraying a beautiful young woman with a mysterious, ethereal quality. Used in plays featuring supernatural female characters or spirits.

== B ==
Bon Odori
Traditional festival dances (盆踊り) performed during Obon to welcome ancestral spirits. Dating back 600 years, these dances vary by region, each area having its own distinctive music and movements. Originally Nenbutsu folk dances, they now encompass various local styles, from Hokkaido's "Sōran Bushi" to Kagoshima's "Ohara Bushi".
Budōgoto
A type of kabuki role (武道事, "martial arts matter") featuring combat scenes and swordplay, often including the portrayal of wounded warriors. These roles require specialized training in stage combat and the stylized presentation of martial techniques.

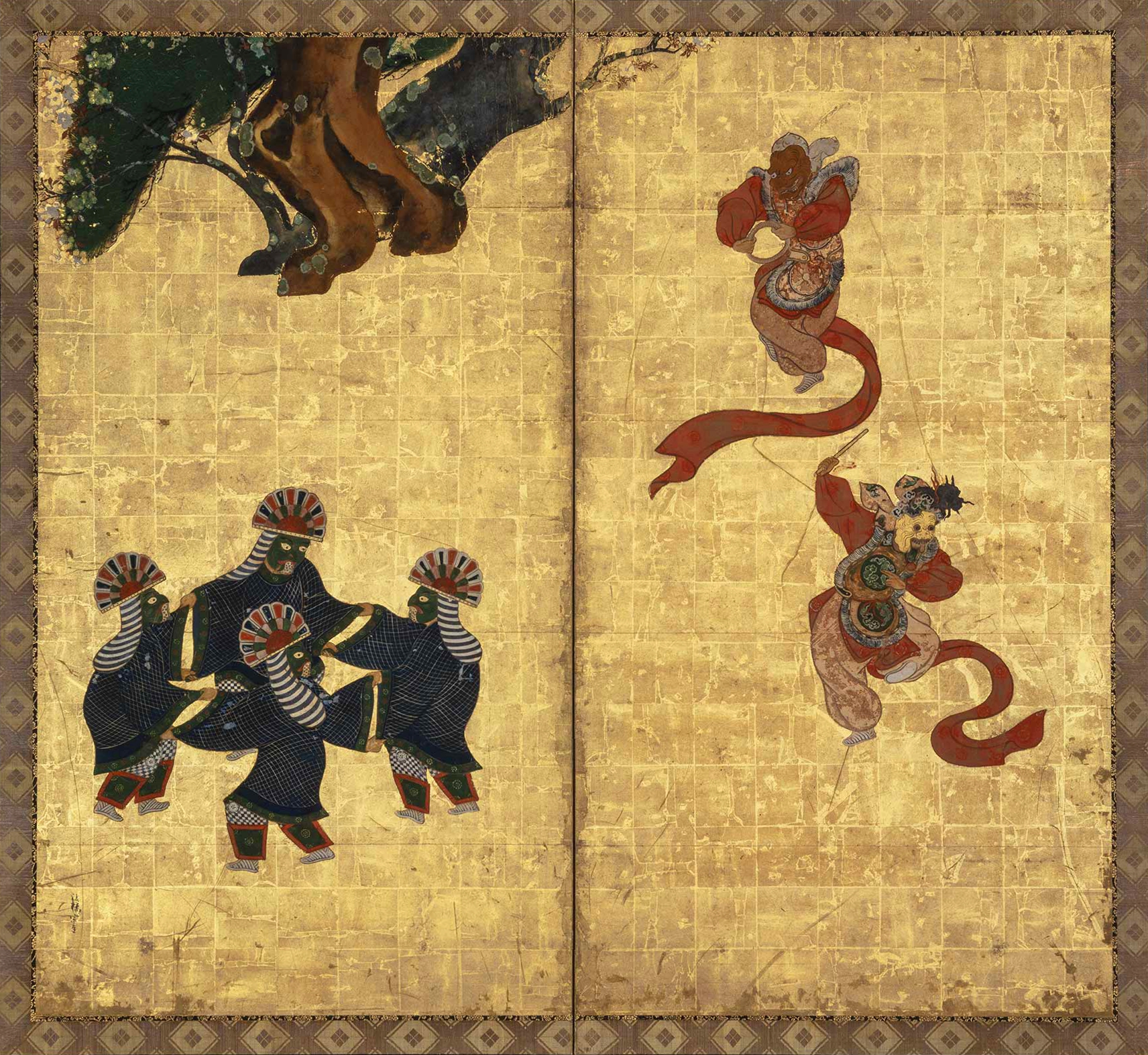
Bugaku Dance by Tawara Sōtatsu, 17th century

Bugaku
Imperial court dance (舞楽) that originated in ancient China and Korea, performed in elaborate costumes to the accompaniment of gagaku court music. It is still performed at the Imperial Palace and major shrines.

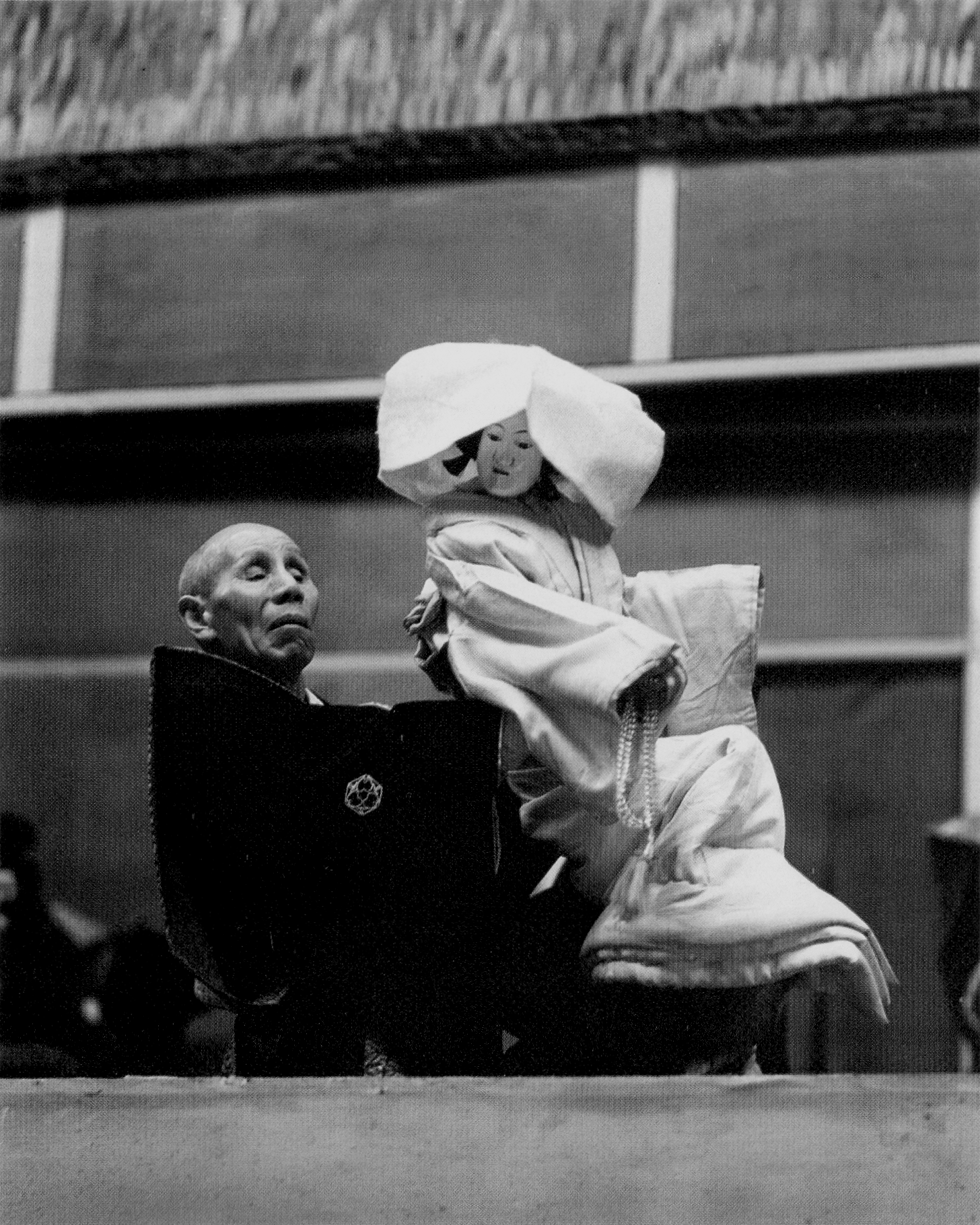
Bunraku: Yoshida Bungorō IV operating Chiyo, a puppet, 1942

Bunraku
Traditional Japanese puppet theater (文楽), founded in Osaka in the beginning of the 17th century. Bunraku uses sophisticated puppets operated by three-person teams in black clothing (kuroko), accompanied by narrative chanting by tayu and shamisen music. Puppets have articulated faces and limbs, with different handlers controlling head/right arm (Omo-zukai), left arm (Hidari-zukai), and legs (Ashi-zukai).
Bunraku puppet
The puppets used in Bunraku measure 130-150 cm in length and weigh up to 10 kg, constructed with wooden heads (kashira), shoulder boards, trunks, arms, and legs. Puppets often have movable eyes, eyebrows, and mouth, with about 70 traditional head types. Male puppets have feet, while female puppets create movement through kimono manipulation. Smaller heads (tsume) are used for background characters to make principal roles more prominent.
Butai
See Noh stage.
Butoh
An avant-garde performance art that emerged in post-war Japan. Characterized by white-painted performers moving in a slow, controlled fashion, incorporating grotesque imagery and taboo themes. Developed by Tatsumi Hijikata and Kazuo Ohno in the late 1950s.

== C ==
Chakkirako
A traditional dance from Miura, Kanagawa Prefecture, performed by young women at New Year celebrations. Features the use of wooden clappers (chakki) and celebrates the local fishing culture.
Chindon'ya
Street performers (チンドン屋, also known historically as tōzai'ya 東西屋 or hiromeya 広目屋) who combine music and elaborate costumes to advertise for businesses. Originating in 19th-century Osaka, these musical advertisers evolved from solo performers to small bands, reaching their peak popularity in post-war Japan before declining with the rise of modern advertising methods.
Chorei-beshimi
A category of Noh mask depicting powerful supernatural beings, characterized by its fierce expression with bared teeth and wrinkled brow.
Chūnori
Aerial stunts in kabuki (宙乗り) where actors are suspended by wires to simulate flight, typically used for supernatural characters. Traditionally beginning at the suppon trap door and ending in upper-level seating areas. A type of keren.
Chūshibai
A middle-sized kabuki theater (中芝居), also known as hamashibai (浜芝居) when located near riverbanks.

== D ==
Daijin-bashira
Main stage pillars (大臣柱) marking the boundaries of the primary performance space, located between the takemoto platform and kuromisu screen. Originally supported a roof, now removable.
Daikagura
A traditional Japanese performance art (太神楽/大神楽, "great divine music") that evolved from Shinto ritual origins. Originally featuring masked lion dancers with musical accompaniment who performed at shrine festivals to ward off evil spirits, it developed into a complex entertainment form incorporating juggling and acrobatic skills. Traditional acts:
- Shishi-mai (lion dance)
- Hanakagomori (bottomless basket juggling)
- Bangasa (parasol spinning)
- Kagomari (ball, bucket and stick juggling)
- Drumsticks juggling
Initially associated with Atsuta and Ise shrines, performers organized into professional groups (kumi) by the 18th century, later expanding their venues to include theaters and entertainment districts.
Daimokutate
A medieval Japanese performance art that combined recitation with mimetic movement. It served as a precursor to later theatrical forms and was often performed by shrine personnel.
Dainichido Bugaku
A ritual dance tradition from Hachimantai, Iwate Prefecture, recognized as an Important Intangible Cultural Property. Combines Buddhist and folk elements in its ceremonies.
Dammari
Silent pantomime scenes in kabuki (だんまり) depicting characters searching in darkness, requiring actors to convincingly portray inability to see while maintaining theatrical visibility.
Dengaku
An ancient form of Japanese rural theater and dance that originated from rice planting songs and ceremonies. It later developed into a more sophisticated theatrical form that influenced the development of Noh theater.
Dekata
Theater ushers (出方) who served food and sake to clients during Edo-period performances, a practice that ended in the Meiji era.
Dōkegata
Comic actors (道化方).

== E ==
Ebizori
Stylized backward-arching pose (海老反り, "shrimp-bend") expressing submission to power or intense emotion, particularly notable in onnagata performances.
Eisa
A traditional Okinawan folk dance (エイサー) performed during the Bon festival. Features dynamic drumming, group choreography, and distinctive costumes.
Ende
Distinctive wig style (燕手, "swallow-wings") for tachiyaku roles, featuring extended side pieces resembling swallow wings, typically worn by villainous characters.
Enkiri
Dramatic scenes in kabuki (縁切/愛想づかし) depicting forced separation of lovers, typically accompanied by music and often leading to tragic consequences. Features stylized expressions of hidden emotions and misunderstandings.

== F ==
Fuebashira
The "flute pillar" (笛柱) on the Noh stage, located at downstage left. Named for its proximity to where the flute player sits during performances.
Fukeoyama
Actors (老女方) specializing in elderly female roles.
Fukeyaku
Actors (老役) who play both male and female elderly characters.
Furyū Noh
A style of Noh performance (風流能) characterized by elaborate stage action, acrobatics, stage properties, and multiple characters, with less emphasis on plot development.
Futayaku
An actor (二役) who performs multiple roles in the same play.

== G ==
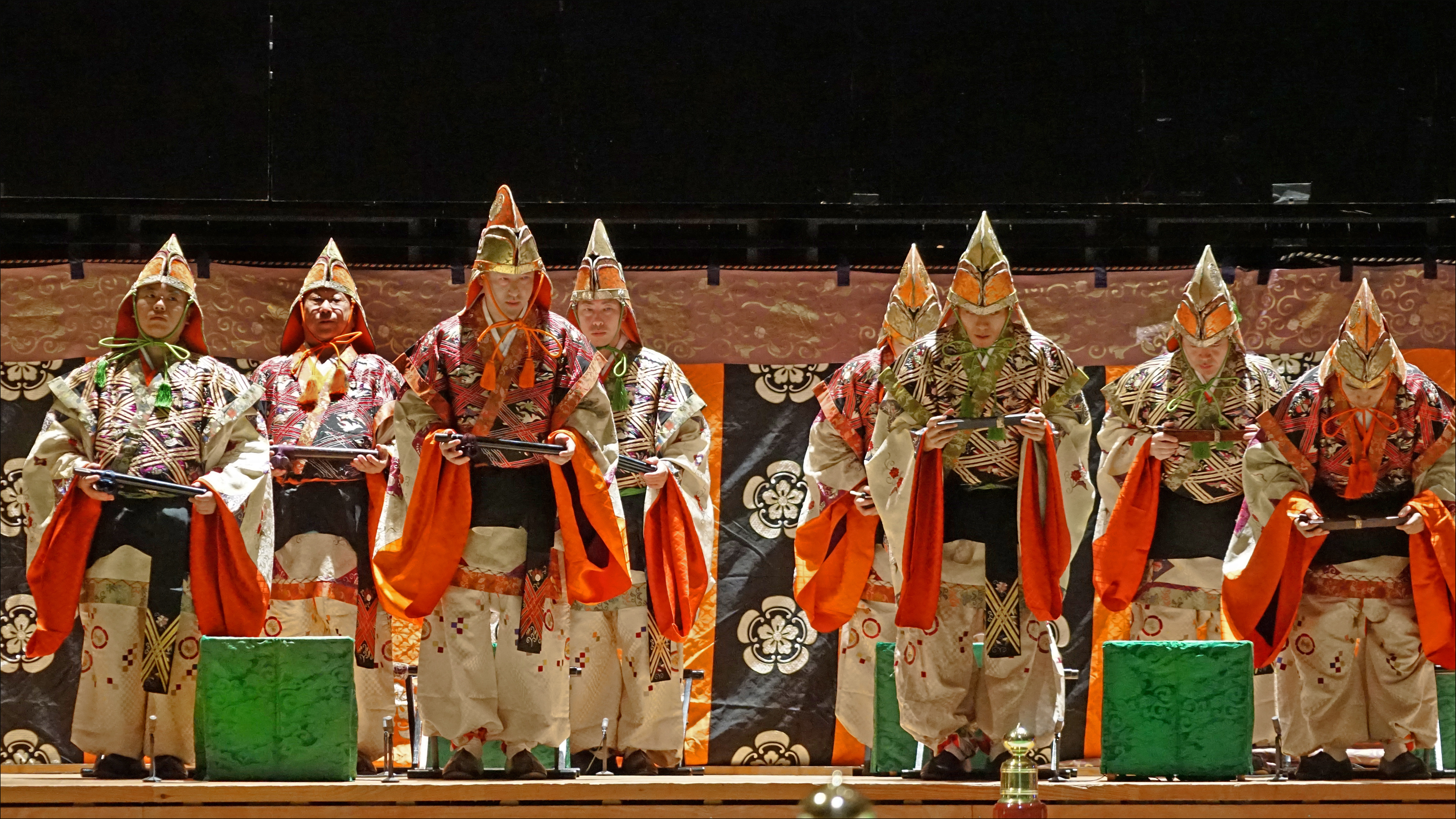
Gagaku musicians

Gagaku
Traditional Japanese court music (雅楽, "elegant music") that has accompanied ceremonies and rituals since the 7th century. Features orchestral arrangements of wind and string instruments, plus drums, performed in highly structured compositions.
Gakuya
Backstage areas (楽屋) housing actors, stage crews, and support staff. Historically arranged by actors' roles and status.

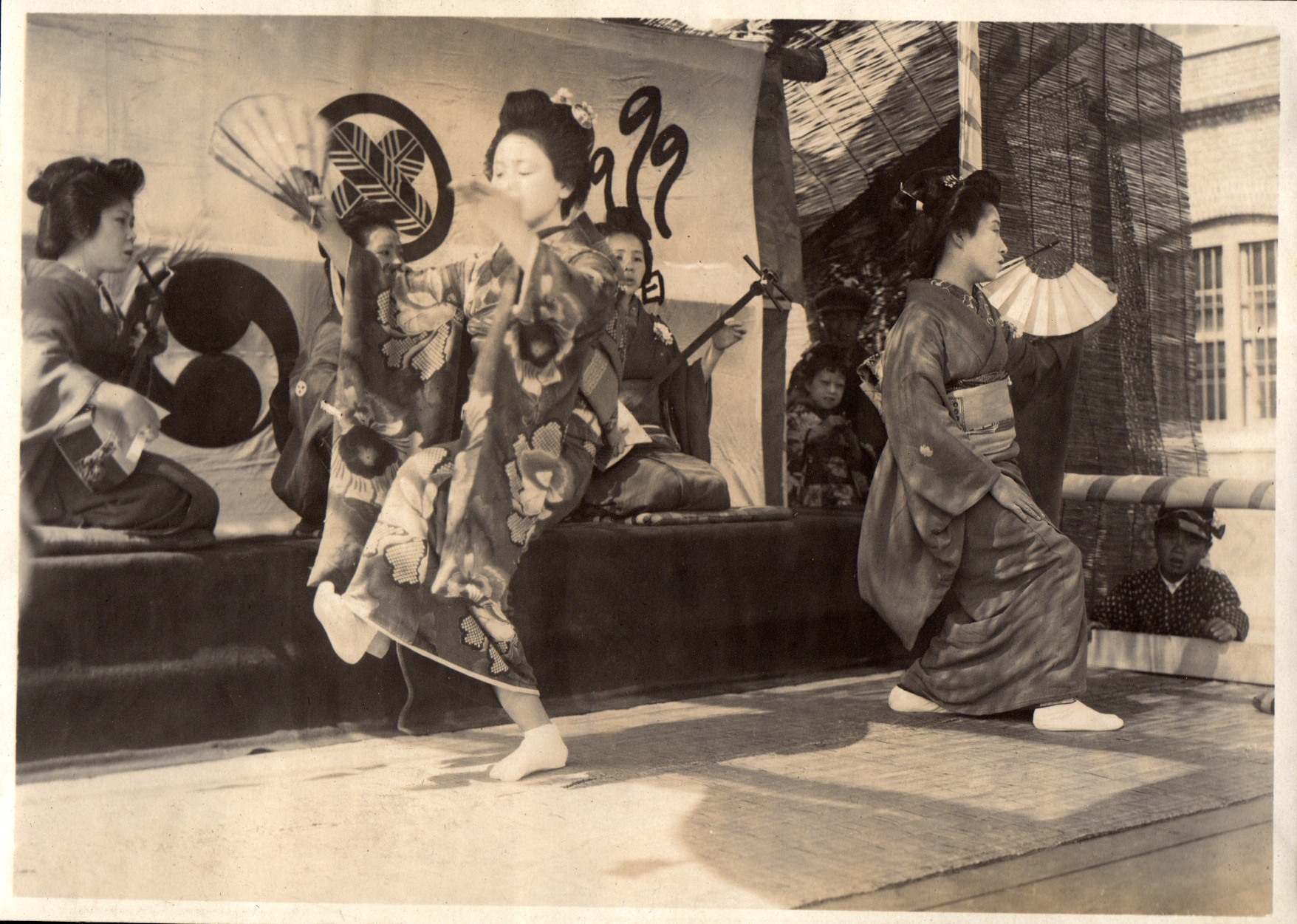
Geisha dance, c.1914-1918

Geiko
Kyoto's term for geisha (芸子, "arts child"), professional female entertainers trained in traditional Japanese arts including dance, music, and conversation. Distinguished from the more commonly used term geisha (芸者, "arts person").
Geinyabanashi
Artful tales (芸屋噺) performed in yose theaters, characterized by their sophisticated narrative techniques and artistic presentation. These stories often featured themes of everyday life and human relationships.

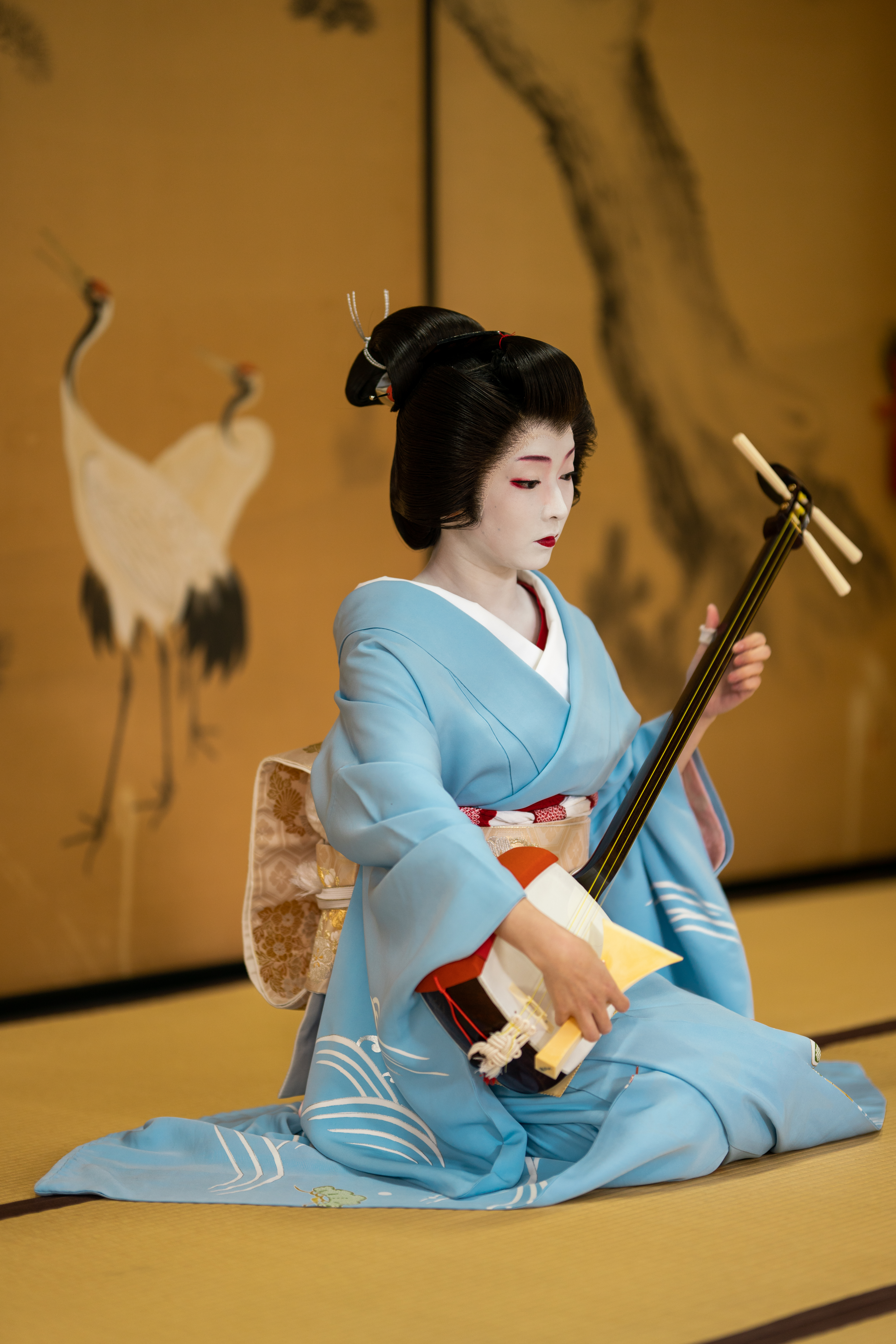
Kyoto geiko (geisha) Toshimana playing shamisen. She is wearing full make-up and a katsura (wig), a blue hikizuri kimono with short sleeves, and a stiff brocade obi tied into a taiko-musubi knot.

Geisha
Traditional female performing artists and entertainers (芸者, "arts person") skilled in classical music, dance, games, and conversation. Operating within strictly regulated entertainment districts (hanamachi), they undergo years of training in traditional arts. In Kyoto, they are known as geiko (芸子), while apprentices are called maiko (舞妓). Their public performances include annual dance events such as Miyako Odori, though they primarily entertain at private gatherings in traditional teahouses (ochaya).
Geki Noh
A style of Noh performance (劇能) that emphasizes dramatic plot development and narrative action, focusing on storytelling rather than spectacle.
Genroku Kabuki
Pivotal period (元禄歌舞伎, 1688-1704) when kabuki reached artistic maturity, marked by development of aragoto and wagoto styles, establishment of onnagata art, and emergence of professional playwrights.
Genzai Noh
A category of Noh plays (現在能, "present Noh") featuring human characters with events unfolding in a linear timeline, focusing on realistic situations and contemporary settings.
Geza
A small black room (下座, also called kuromisu) on the left side of the kabuki stage with a slatted window, housing musicians who provide background music and sound effects. This "hidden orchestra" (Kagebayashi) includes shamisen, drums, bells, and flute players. Musical effects performed from behind a black screen (kuromisu), including songs (uta), shamisen music (aikata), and sound effects (narimono) for natural phenomena and supernatural elements, is also called geza.
Gidayū
A style of musical narration (義太夫) created by Takemoto Gidayū in Osaka in 1684, used in puppet theater (ningyō jōruri) and kabuki's gidayū kyōgen.
Gigaku
An ancient form of masked dance-drama (伎楽) that arrived in Japan from Korea in 612 CE. Though primarily performed for Buddhist ceremonies, it significantly influenced later Japanese mask theater, particularly Noh. Its techniques for mask-making, including the use of carved wood and painted features, established foundations for Noh mask craftsmanship. The practice of using masks to represent specific character types became a fundamental element of Noh theater.

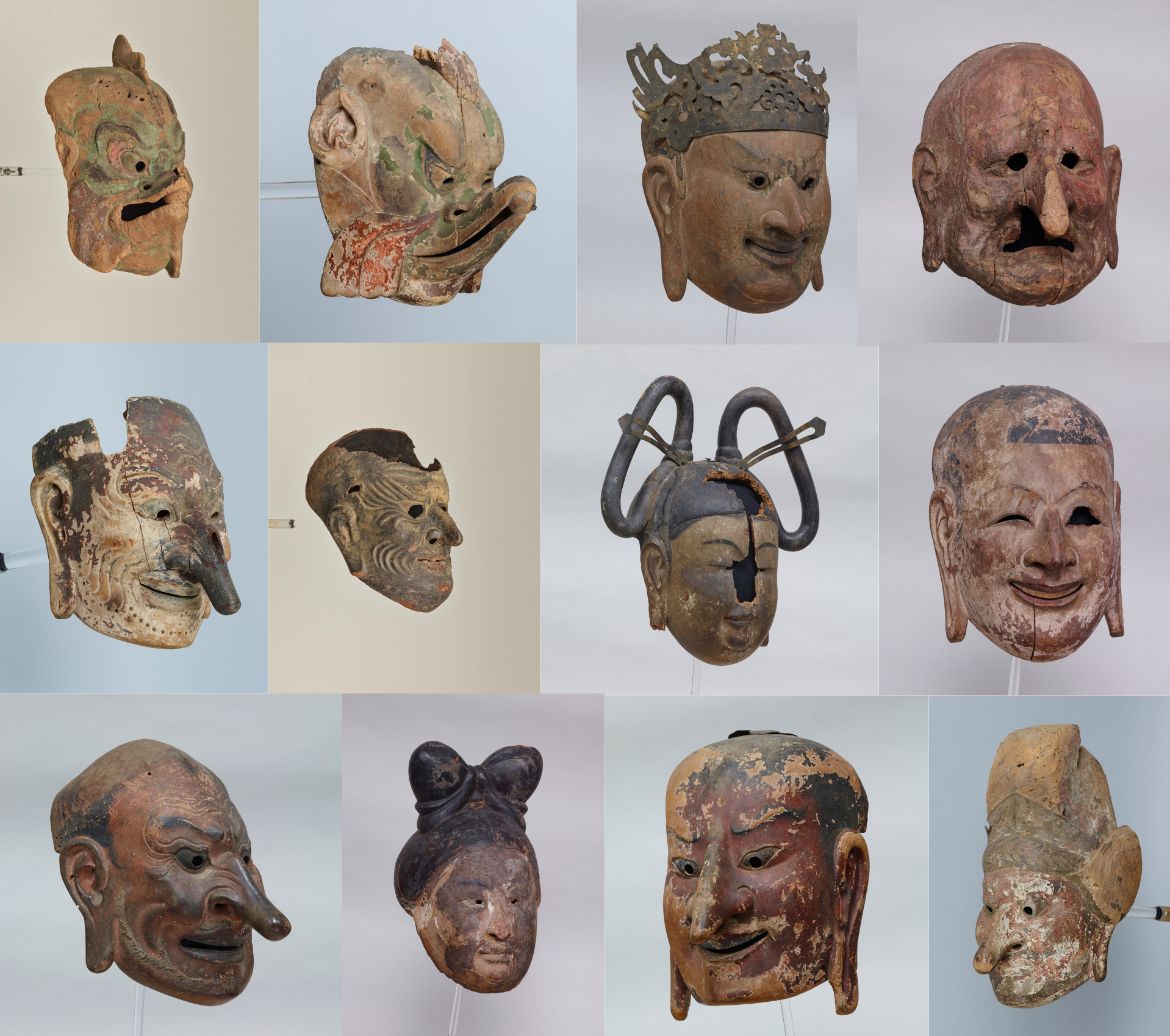
Gigaku masks (Horyuji Treasures)

Gigaku masks
Large wooden masks (伎楽面) used in Gigaku performances, characterized by their exaggerated features and larger-than-life size. Their construction techniques, including the hollowing method (うつろ, utsuro) and facial proportion systems, influenced the later development of Noh masks. While Gigaku masks were larger and more exaggerated, their basic principles of character representation through fixed expressions carried into Noh mask design.
Gōrunden kombi
A "golden combination" (ゴールデンコンビ) of famous kabuki actors performing together.
Gosekku
Five seasonal festivals (五節句) traditionally associated with kabuki performances, their motifs often incorporated into costume designs.
Gōshū ondo
A folk dance style from the Ōmi region (近江音頭), featuring characteristic rhythmic patterns and movements. Popular at summer festivals and gatherings.

== H ==
Habutae
A silk or cotton skull cap (羽二重) worn by actors under their wigs, also referring to the silk fitted over a wig's metal foundation.
Hachinin-gei
A performance art (八人芸, "eight-person art") where a single performer rapidly changes costumes and personas to portray multiple characters in succession, traditionally eight different people.
Haimyō
Literary name (俳名) of kabuki actors, originally haiku pen-names. Though most popular during the Edo period when some actors were also renowned poets, some actors still use these literary names today.
Hakomawashi
Traveling puppeteers (箱廻し) who performed solo, handling puppets and providing narration themselves. They traditionally visited homes during New Year, performing at doorways to ward off evil and bring good fortune.
Hakushiki-jō
A type of Noh mask representing a mature male character of high status, characterized by its white coloring and serene expression.
A central aesthetic concept in Noh (花, "flower") explained by Zeami in his Kadensho. Represents two types of beauty: the temporary beauty of youth ("individual hana") and the enduring beauty of mature artistic mastery ("true hana"). True hana is considered the ultimate goal of Noh performance, transcending technique to create perfect beauty that can be appreciated by any audience.

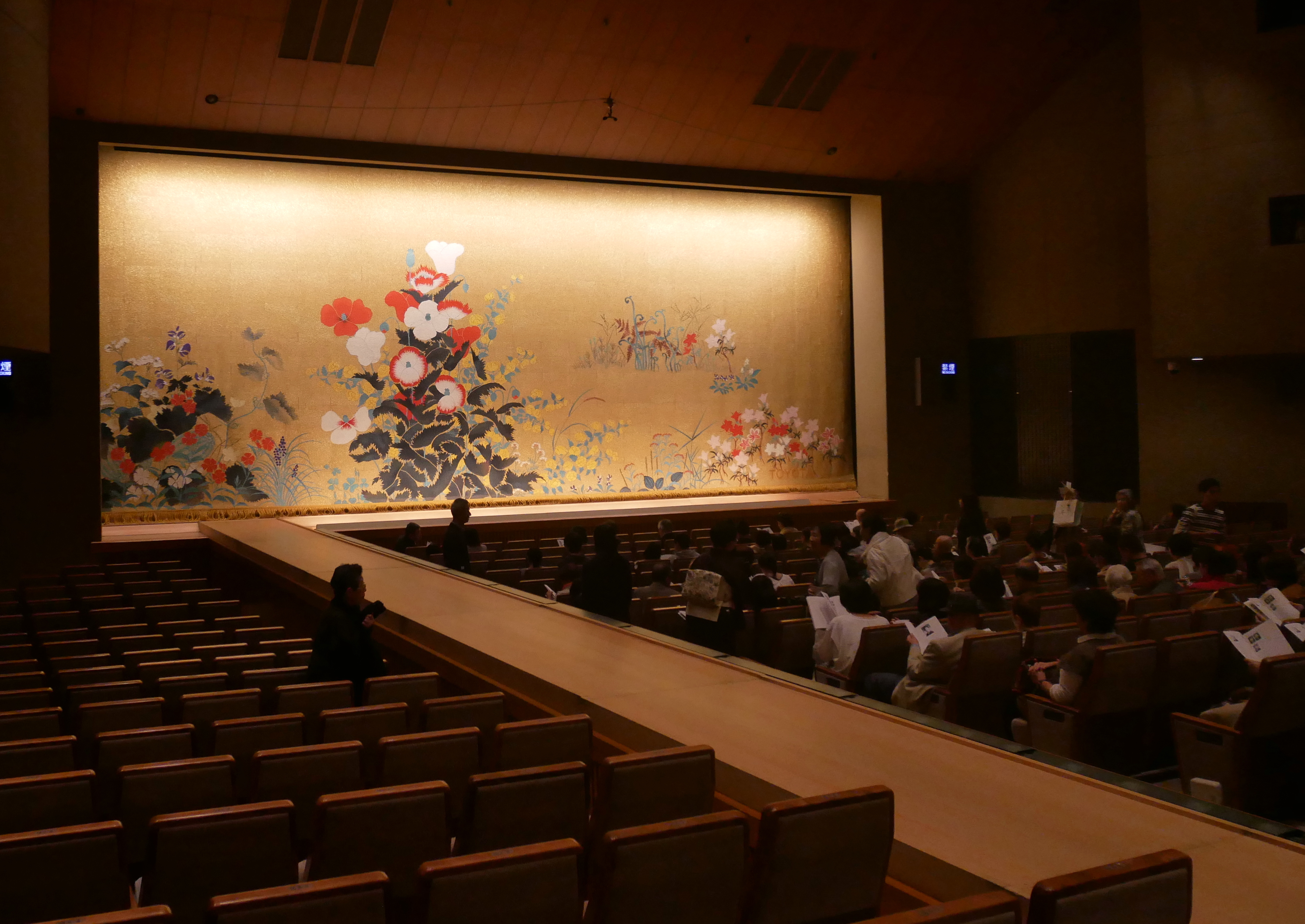
The hanamichi at National Theatre of Japan

Hanamichi
A raised walkway (花道, "flower path") in Kabuki theater that extends from the back of the theater through the audience to the main stage. This extension of the stage serves multiple dramatic purposes: as an entrance and exit path for actors, a space for dramatic reveals and important scenes, and a way to bring the action closer to the audience. The hanamichi includes a special position called "shichisan" (七三, "seven-three"), located about 70% of the way from the stage, where actors often perform important speeches or poses.
Handōgataki
Comic villain roles (半道敵, "half-villain") combining menace with humor, often wearing namazukuma makeup for comic effect.
Hannya
A Noh mask depicting a jealous female demon, characterized by its horns, metallic eyes, and fearsome expression. Used in plays about transformed women.

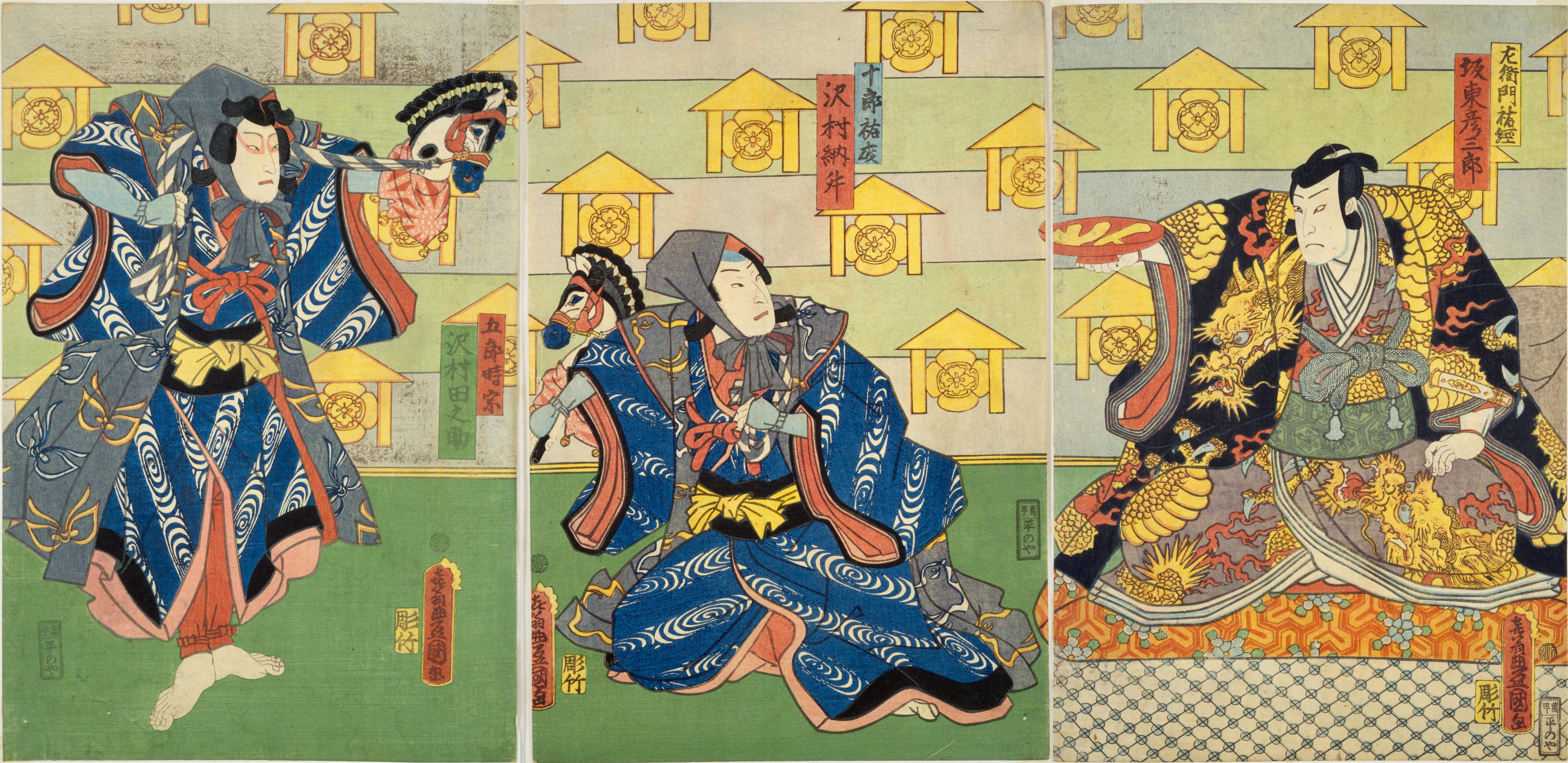
Harukoma by Utagawa Kunisada, 1862

Harukoma
A traditional Japanese dance (春駒, "spring horse") where performers use handheld horse-head props to depict playful horses.
Hatsubutai
An actor's stage debut (初舞台), marking their first official performance appearance.
Hatsuharu Kyōgen
The first performance of the new year (初春狂言, "early spring play"), following the kaomise season. Traditionally features different play types in Edo (sogamono) and Kamigata (ni-no-kawari) regions. Also known as haru kyōgen, hatsu kyōgen, or hatsu shibai.
Hayachine kagura
A form of sacred dance from Iwate Prefecture, performed as offerings at shrines. Combines elements of both yamabushi kagura and satokagura traditions.
Hayagawari
Quick costume changes (早替り) performed by actors during performances.
Hayashi
The instrumental ensemble (囃子) in Noh theater, consisting of four musicians playing the nōkan flute, ōtsuzumi, kotsuzumi, and taiko drums.
Hayashigata
A member of the hayashi.
Hengemono
A specialized performance style (変化物, "transformation piece") in kabuki where a single actor rapidly changes costumes and makeup to portray multiple characters in succession within the same dance piece.
Higashiyama
A cultural movement during the late Muromachi period that significantly influenced the development of Japanese arts, including Noh theater. Characterized by its emphasis on refined aesthetics and spiritual depth, it helped shape many of the philosophical principles that guide Noh performance.
Hikae Yagura
Substitute theaters (控櫓, "substitute drum tower") in Edo authorized to perform kabuki when licensed theaters faced financial difficulties. System established in 1734, with specific pairings between main theaters (hon yagura) and their substitutes.
Hikidōgu
Wheeled platforms (引道具) used in kabuki to move set pieces or actors across the stage.
Hikimaku
The kabuki stage curtain (引幕) pulled from right to left, featuring distinctive three-stripe patterns in colors specific to each theater. Also called jōshikimaku.
Hikinuki
A quick-change technique (引抜) where an outer costume is removed by pulling threads to reveal a different costume underneath, performed with the help of stage assistants.
Hon'anmono
Kabuki plays (翻案物) adapted from foreign works but reset with Japanese characters and settings.
Honbutai
The main performance area or "main stage" (本舞台) of the Noh theater, distinguished from the bridgeway and subsidiary spaces.
Honmizu
Real water effects (本水) used as spectacular stage techniques (keren) in kabuki performances.
Honmyō
An actor's real name (本名), as distinct from their stage name or other professional names.
Hyakunichi
A specific type of wig (百日, "hundred days") featuring long, unkempt black hair, used to portray characters who haven't cut their hair for extended periods, such as ill heroes or notorious thieves.
Hyōbanki
Critical evaluations and rankings of kabuki actors (評判記) published during the Edo period. These reviews served as both entertainment and guides for theatergoers, often featuring detailed analyses of actors' performances and their particular strengths.
Hyōshigi
Wooden clappers (拍子木) used to signal important moments in kabuki performances, originally developed for sutra recitation.
Hyōshigoto
Dances (拍子事) characterized by rhythmic foot-stamping to keep time.
Hyōshimai
An early form of kabuki dance (拍子舞) where performers simultaneously sing and dance.

== I ==
Ichibanme
The first section (一番目) of a kabuki program, traditionally featuring historical plays (jidaimono). The term reflects the structured organization of kabuki programs that developed after the Genroku era.
Ichiza
A troupe (一座).
Iemoto
Literally a "family foundation" (家元), the current head of a school of Japanese traditional art.
Ie no gei
Family arts (家の芸) passed down through generations, including specific roles and performance techniques.
Iroaku
Handsome villain roles (色悪) depicting attractive but ruthless characters, developed in late Edo period.

== J ==
Jidaimono
Historical plays (時代物) in kabuki theater, typically set in Japan's feudal past and featuring samurai, lords, and historical figures. These plays often focus on themes of loyalty, honor, and political intrigue.
Jitsuaku
A purely evil character role (実悪), typically an evil samurai.
Jitsugoto
Realistic acting style and character type (実事) portraying honest individuals in tragic circumstances, contrasting with more stylized aragoto and wagoto performances.
Jiutai
The chorus (地謡) in Noh theater, typically consisting of six to ten singers who sit at the side of the stage and provide narrative and commentary.
Jo-ha-kyū
A concept of modulation and movement applied in various Japanese traditional arts. In theater, it refers to the tripartite structure of beginning (jo), break or development (ha), and rapid finish (kyū).
Jokyokumai
A variant of kusemai (女曲舞, "women's curved dance") in which female performers wear male clothing while performing the traditionally male kusemai dances. This form represents one of several gender-crossing performance traditions in Japanese theatrical history.
Jōruri
A form of traditional Japanese narrative music in which a tayū (太夫) sings to the accompaniment of a shamisen. Jōruri accompanies bunraku, traditional puppet theater.

== K ==
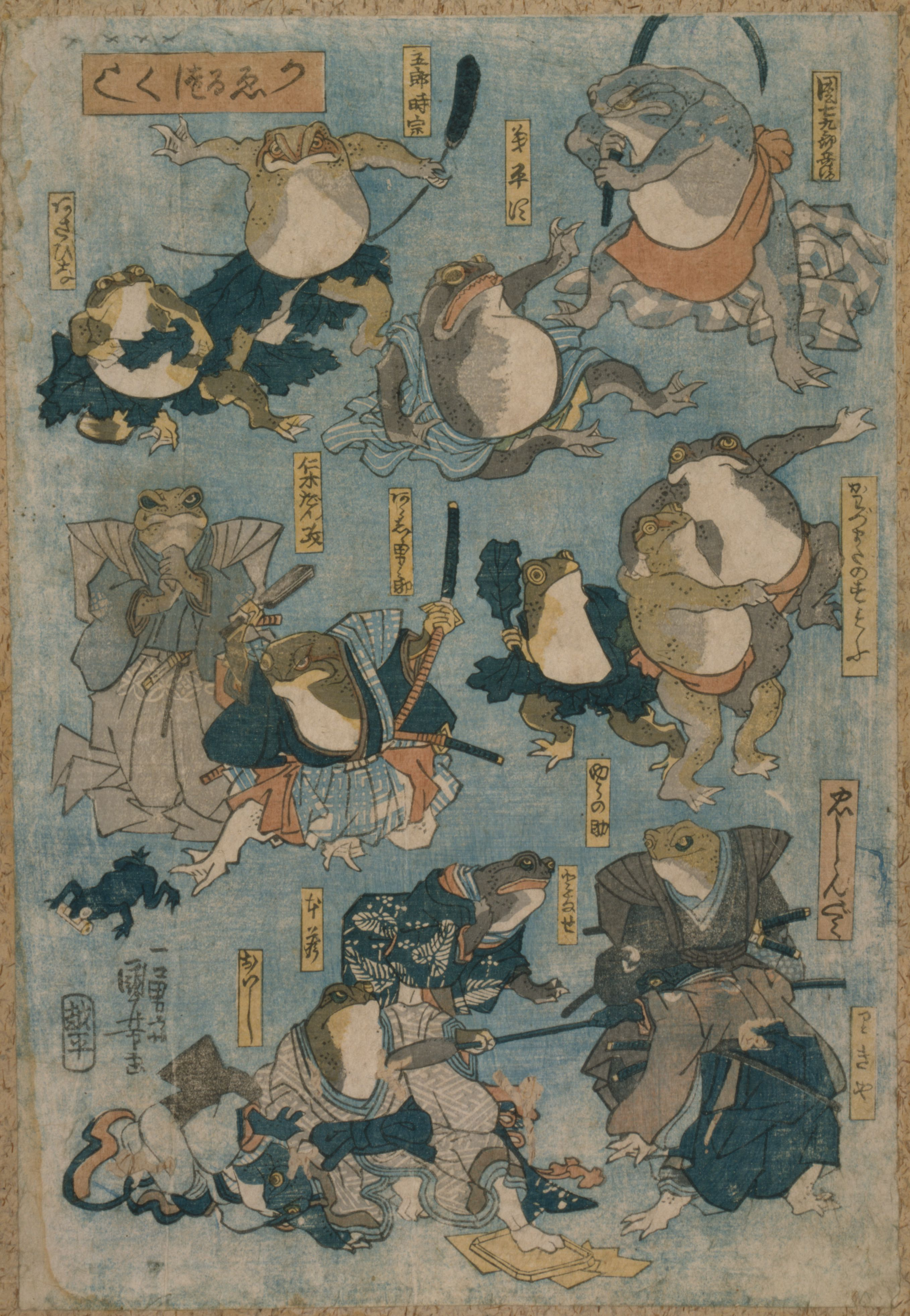
"Famous heroes of the kabuki stage played by frogs" by Utagawa Kuniyoshi, ca. 1875

Kabuki
A classical Japanese dance-drama known for its stylized performances, elaborate costumes, and distinctive stage makeup (kumadori). Originally developed in the early 17th century by Izumo no Okuni, it became an all-male theatrical form after women were banned from performing in 1629.
Kabuki brush
A specialized makeup brush used in kabuki theater for applying white foundation (oshiroi) and other cosmetics. The brush features a flat, wide head and is designed for smooth, even application of theatrical makeup.

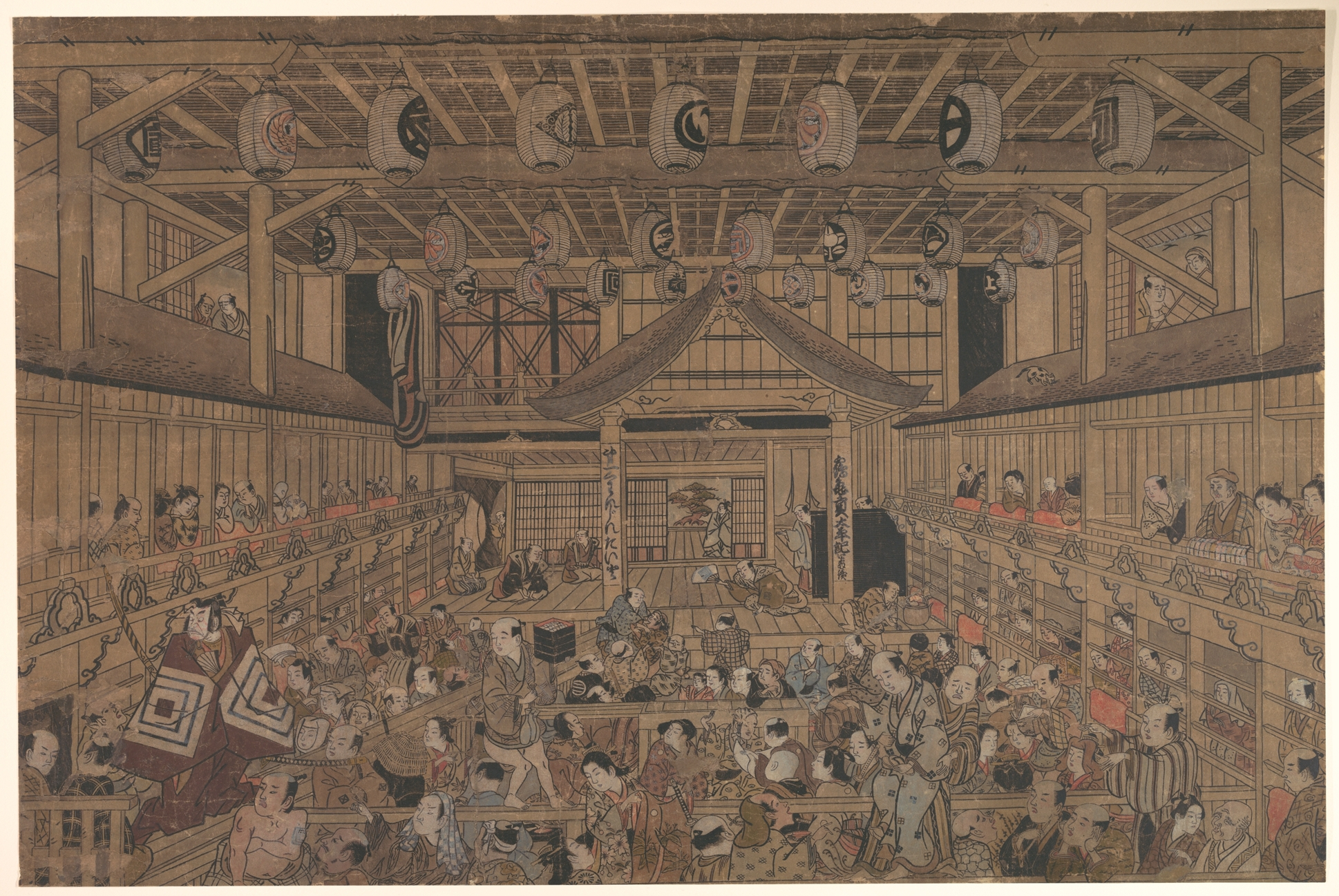
The interior of a kabuki theater on a print by Ichikawa Danjuro II, c. 1738

Kabuki theater
Traditional Japanese theater buildings (歌舞伎座) with distinctive architectural and organizational features: Stage elements:
- Hanamichi (花道) - Raised passageway through the audience
- Mawari-butai (回り舞台) - Revolving stage
- Seri (迫り) - Trap doors and lifting mechanisms
- Kuromisu (黒水) - Musicians' screen room
- Suppon (スッポン) - Stage lift under the hanamichi

Theater organization:

- Zamoto (座元) - Theater manager/owner
- Tatekata (立方) - Acting section
- Hayashikata (囃子方) - Music section
- Geza (下座) - Orchestra space
- Kurogo (黒衣) - Stage assistants
The building design incorporates both traditional elements and modern theatrical technology, while maintaining historical conventions of space usage and organizational hierarchy.
Kabu-isshin
A fundamental principle in Noh (歌舞一心, "song-dance-one heart") that emphasizes the complete unity of song, dance, and spiritual intention in performance. This concept requires performers to achieve perfect integration of all performance elements, treating song and dance as inseparable aspects of the same artistic expression.
Kachāshī
An Okinawan folk dance (カチャーシー) performed at the end of festivals and celebrations. Characterized by its free-form, joyous movements.
Kagema
Male performers (陰間) who specialized in female roles in early kabuki, before the establishment of the onnagata tradition.

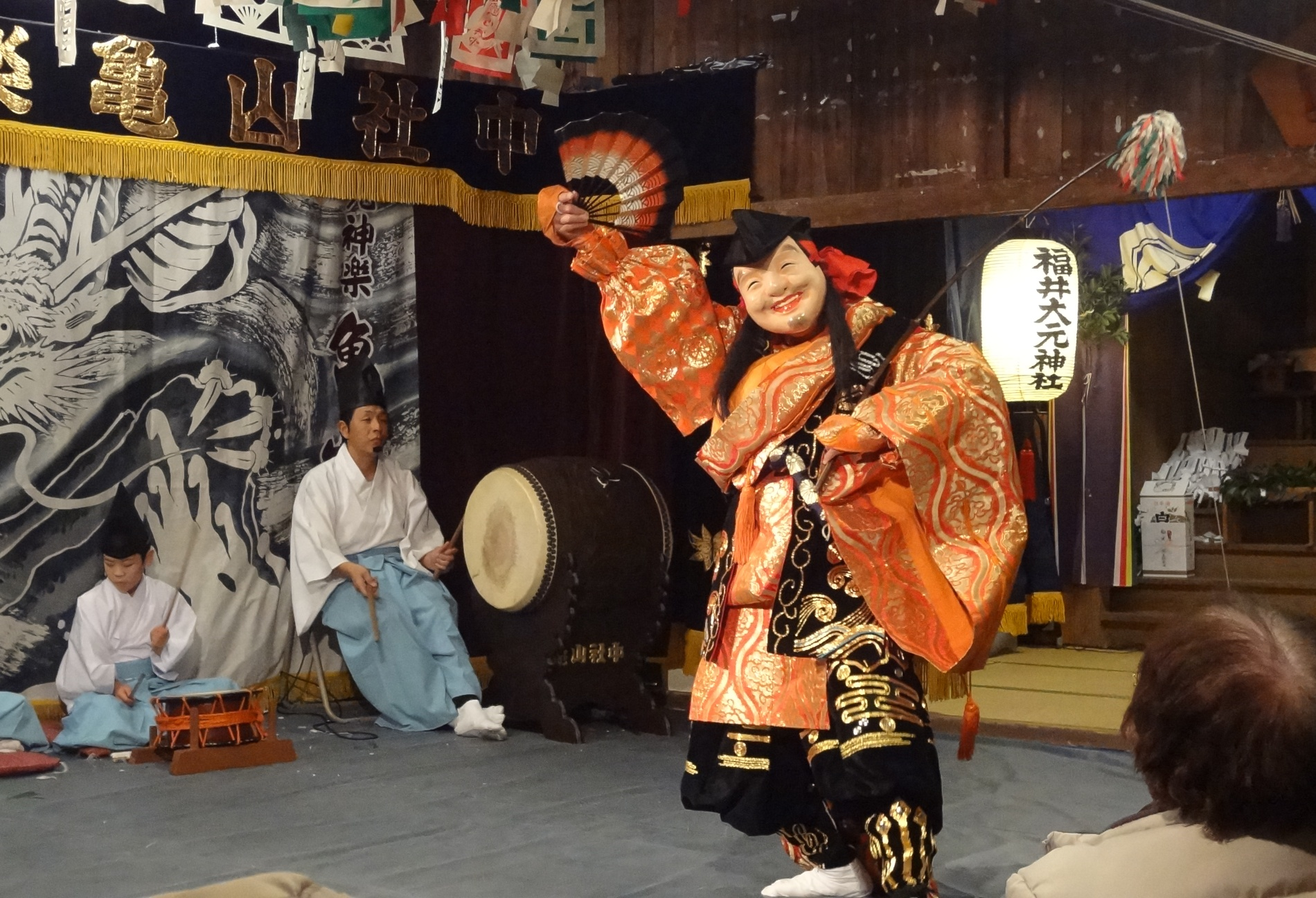
Iwami Kagura: the performance depicts Kotoshironushi fishing for sea bream.

Kagura
Sacred Shinto dance (神楽) performed at shrines as offerings to the gods. Includes various regional styles and can be either ceremonial or theatrical in nature.
Kaidan
Ghost stories (怪談) performed as theatrical entertainment, often during summer months. These supernatural tales became a popular form of storytelling performance during the Edo period and continue to influence modern Japanese theater and cinema.
Kakegoe
Traditional shouts or calls (掛け声) used in Japanese theater, especially kabuki. These stylized vocalizations are made by experienced audience members (omuko-san) at specific moments to encourage actors and mark dramatic highlights. Common calls include "Yō!" for general encouragement and "Mattemashita!" ("We've been waiting!") when popular actors appear.

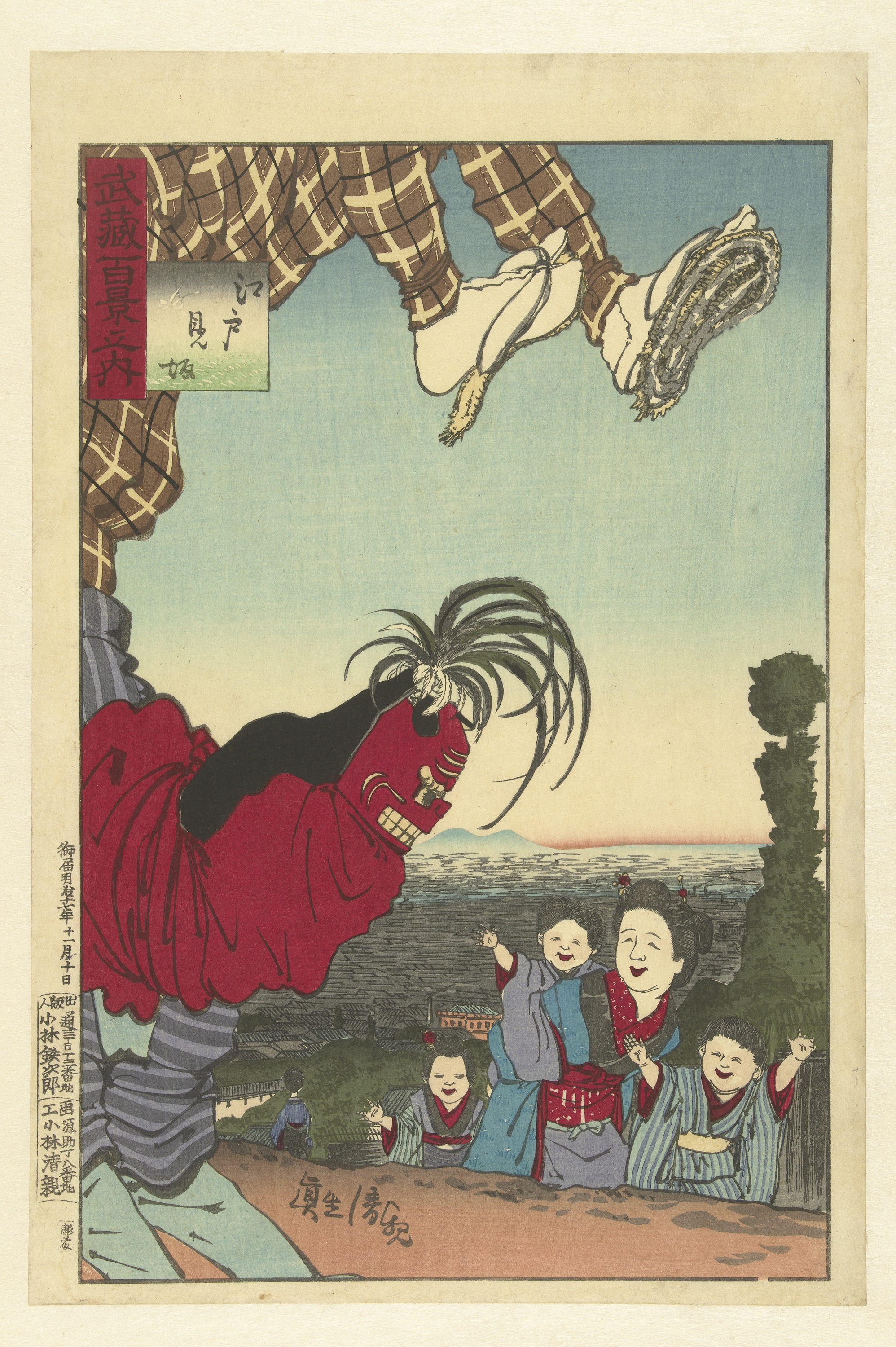
Kakubei-jishi on a print by Kobayashi Kiyochika, 1884

Kakubei-jishi
A children's lion dance (角兵衛獅子) from Echige (now Niigata) Prefecture, performed by youth wearing small lion masks with chicken feather manes and crimson silk neck guards. Alternatively called Echigo-jishi.
Kamigata
The style of kabuki (上方) developed in the Kyoto-Osaka region, characterized by more refined, realistic performances compared to the bombastic Edo style. Features subtle acting and elegant movement patterns.
Kamiko
Paper clothing (紙衣) traditionally worn by Buddhist priests, adapted in kabuki as a beautified symbol of poverty. Often decorated with embroidered love letters in gold and silver on black cloth, used in yatsushi scenes depicting fallen characters.
Kami mono
A category of Noh plays (神物, "god plays") featuring deities as main characters, typically structured in two acts where the deity appears first in human form before revealing their true nature.

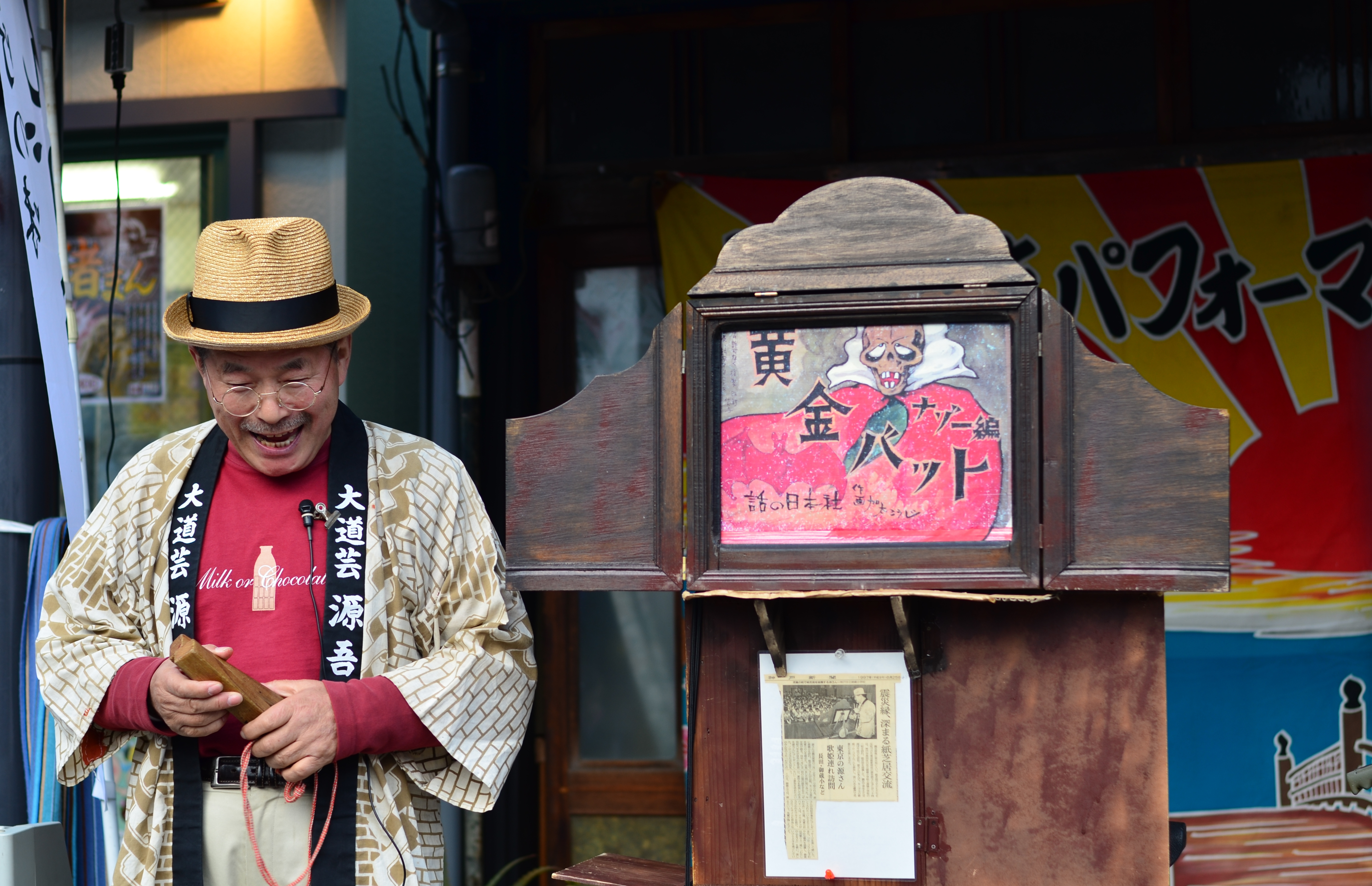
Kamishibai

Kamishibai
A form of street theater storytelling (紙芝居, "paper play") where performers narrated stories using illustrated boards displayed in a miniature stage, popular in Japan from the 1930s until television's advent in the 1950s.
Kamishimo
Formal samurai attire (裃) consisting of kataginu (sleeveless robe) and hakama. While historically plain, kabuki versions feature elaborate colors and patterns to indicate character status and personality.
Kamisuki
Stylized love scene (髪梳き) where a woman combs a man's hair with her ornamental hairpin, expressing intimate affection through choreographed movements and musical accompaniment.
Kamogawa Odori
Annual dance performances (鴨川をどり) by Pontocho geiko in May, known for elaborate fan work.
Kaomise
Annual "face-showing" ceremonies (顔見世) in kabuki theaters, traditionally held in the eleventh lunar month, where theaters present their company of actors for the upcoming season. These performances serve to introduce new actors and showcase the theater's artistic lineup.

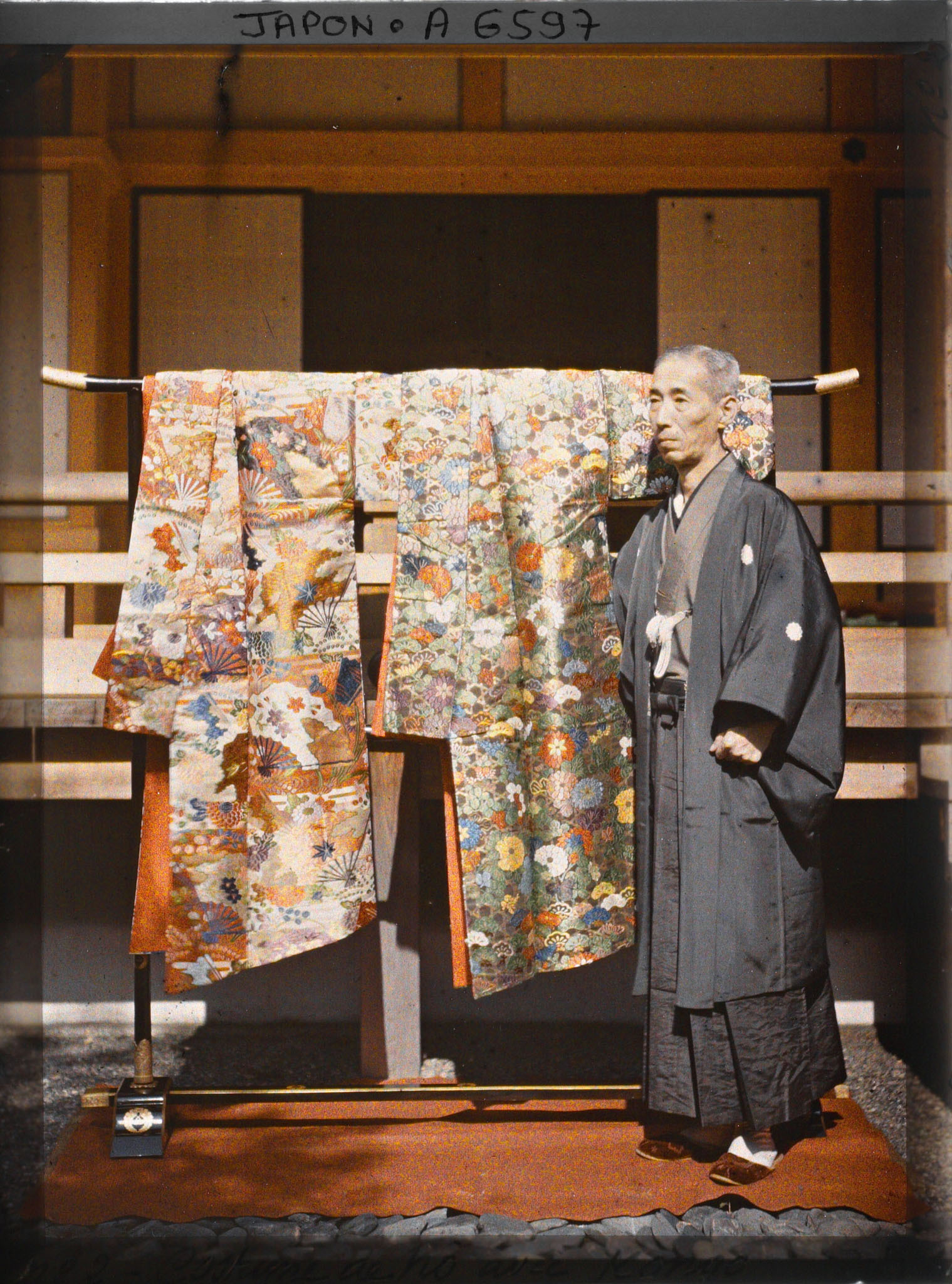
Noh theater costume: two kosode in kara-ori, presented by Kongô Kinnosuke. Photo by Stephane Passet for the Archives of the Planet, Kyoto, 1912.

Karaori
A fine silk brocade (唐織) used primarily for female roles in kabuki and Noh theater, characterized by intricate weaving patterns incorporating metallic threads and delicate motifs of flowers, birds, and landscapes.
Kata
"Units of movement" in the Noh theater. Can be divided into simple movements like kamae (posture) and hakobi (walk), and complex movement with predefined meaning, like shiori ("bringing the cupped hand to eye-level, symbolizing crying"). The katas varies in intensity (depending on a character) and the kata sequences are "strictly" choreographed.
Kataire
Costume style (肩入) featuring patched shoulders and sleeves to represent poverty, though theatrically beautified with decorative patterns. Used for fallen samurai, masterless warriors, and characters in adversity.
Katakiuchi mono
Revenge plays (敵討物) focusing on vendetta stories.
Katakiyaku
Villain roles (敵役) in kabuki.
Kataru
The spoken dialogue portions of Noh plays, as distinct from the sung portions (utai).
Katsura mono
A category of Noh plays (鬘物, "wig plays") featuring female protagonists, known for their refined songs and graceful dance movements.
Katsureki
A style of kabuki plays (活歴, "living history") developed in the Meiji period that aimed for historical accuracy in depicting past events, in contrast to the more stylized traditional historical dramas. These plays emphasized realistic costumes, sets, and historical details rather than conventional theatrical presentations.
Kayaku
Cross-gender casting technique (加役) where actors perform outside their usual specialty for dramatic effect. Notable in cases where tachiyaku actors play female villains.
Kenshibu
Sword dances (剣舞) performed as part of martial arts demonstrations or religious ceremonies. Combines elements of combat techniques with artistic expression.
Keren
Stage tricks and special effects (外連) used in kabuki theater, including trap doors, quick changes, and other theatrical devices to create dramatic or supernatural effects.
Keshō-goe
Ritualized audience calls (化粧声) during aragoto performances, where actors playing daimyo and retainers chant "Arya, Korya" repeatedly, culminating in "Dekkee" when the lead strikes a mie pose. These calls celebrate the hero's dramatic presence and coincide with tsuke (clappers) accompaniment.
Wooden clappers (柝, also called hyōshigi) used for three purposes: shirase (announcing actors' arrival and curtain signals), kikkake (cueing stage mechanics), and tsunagi (maintaining tension between scenes). Operated hidden from view, distinct from visible tsuke signals.
Kiri Noh
The final plays (切り能) in a traditional Noh program, often featuring demons or supernatural beings and characterized by their dynamic movements and dramatic conclusions.

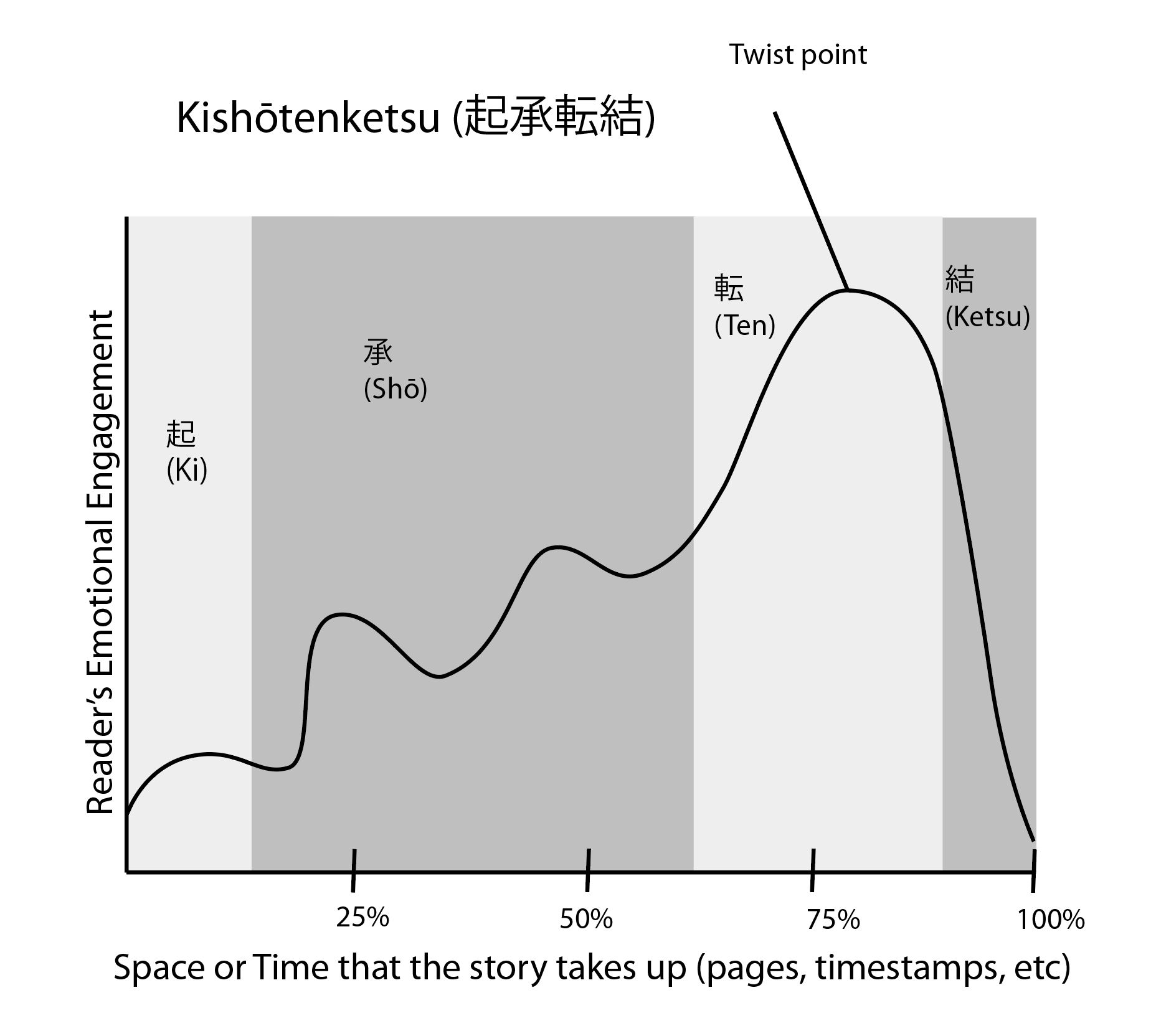
Kishotenketsu. The height of the bumps leading to the twist can change per story.

Kishōtenketsu
A four-part narrative structure (起承転結) common in Chinese, Korean, and Japanese storytelling, characterized by:
1. Ki (起) - Introduction of characters and setting
2. Shō (承) - Development of the narrative
3. Ten (転) - An unexpected twist or change in direction
4. Ketsu (結) - Conclusion that brings the elements together
Unlike Western narrative structures, kishōtenketsu often develops without relying on conflict as the primary driver. This structure appears in various forms, from traditional theater to modern manga.
Kizewamono
A genre of kabuki plays (生世話物, "raw domestic plays") developed by Tsuruya Namboku IV and refined by Kawatake Mokuami, featuring portrayals of society's outcasts: criminals, prostitutes, masterless samurai, and other marginalized figures.
Kōdan
Narrative stories (講談) focusing on historical events and military tales, performed in specialized storytelling theaters (yose). Distinguished from rakugo by its serious, historical content and use of a storytelling desk (kōza).
Kodōgu
Stage props (小道具) in kabuki, including handheld items (weapons, personal belongings) and pre-set pieces (furniture, decorations). Distinguished from larger stage sets, though pieces broken from sets become props when handled by actors.
Kōjō
Formal stage announcements (口上) delivered by actors, typically for succession ceremonies or memorials. Performed either in ceremonial kamishimo dress between acts or in costume during performances.
Kokata
A child actor role in Noh theater.
Kōken
A non-performing, senior actor (後見) in Noh theater who overviews the play and assists the main actor, shite. Koken must take over the shite's role in case shite can't perform.
Kokoro
A crucial concept in Noh (心, "heart/mind") that refers to the mental and spiritual state of the performer. Also read as "shin", it represents the ideal state of consciousness necessary for achieving true artistic expression. To develop hana, the actor must enter a state of no-mind, or mushin.
Kokumochi
Costumes (石持) featuring blank white circles where family crests would normally appear, worn to indicate lower social status or fallen fortunes.
Kouta
Short traditional songs (小唄, "little songs") originating in Edo-period entertainment districts, typically performed by geisha with shamisen accompaniment. These brief pieces, usually under three minutes, contrast with longer nagauta performances.
Koyaku
Child roles (子役) in kabuki.
Kōwakamai
A medieval narrative dance-drama (幸若舞) that influenced the development of Noh theater. Features dramatic recitation of historical tales accompanied by stylized movement.
Kowakare
Emotional scenes (子別れ) depicting parent-child separations, typically performed with shamisen accompaniment.
Kudoki
Dramatic scenes (口説き) where onnagata actors express deep emotions, similar to operatic arias.

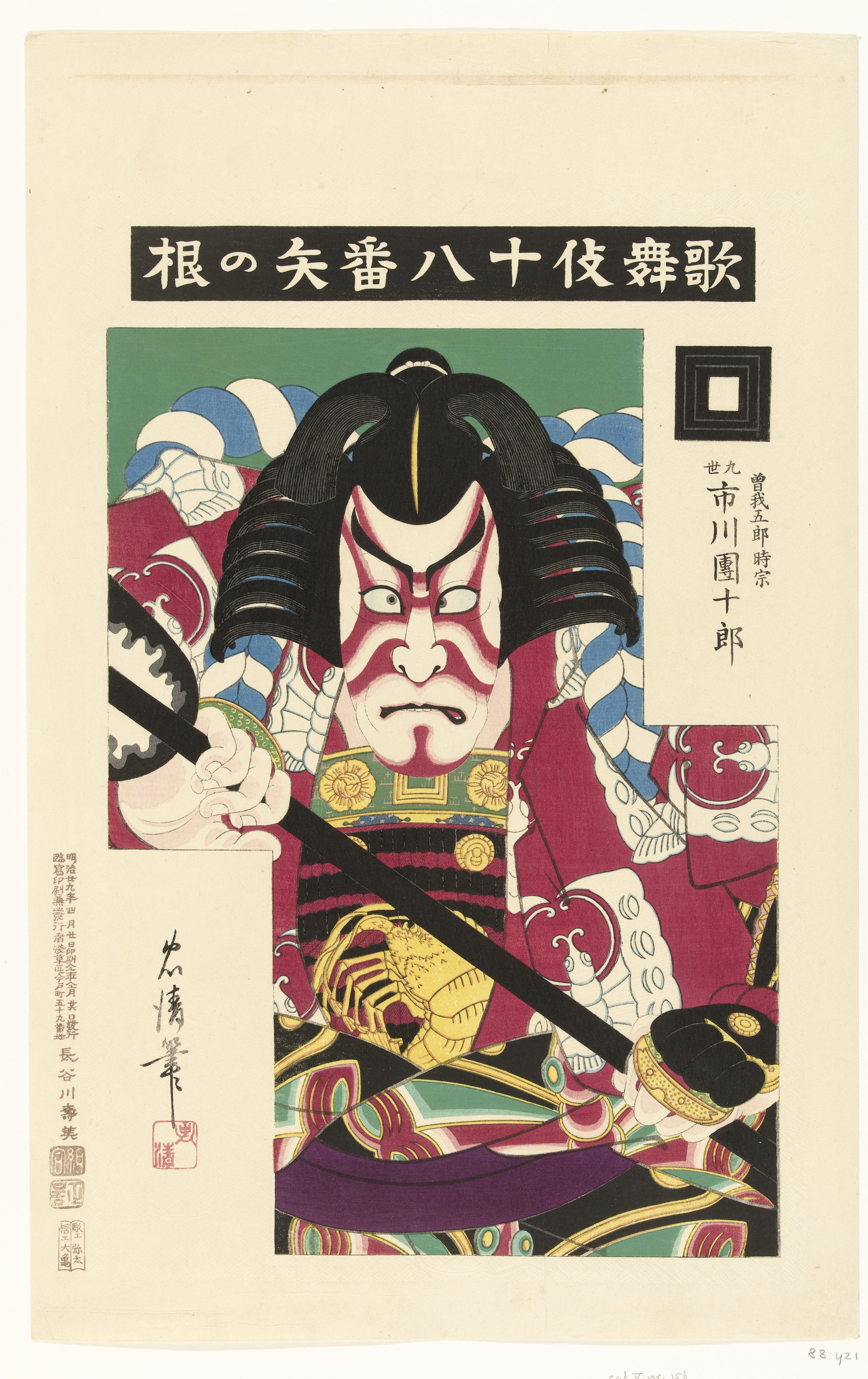
"Ichikawa Danjūrō IX as Soga Gorō Tokimune", featuring Sugi-Guma kumadori makeup and kurumabin wig. Print by Tadakiyo (Hasegawa Kanbee XIV), 1896

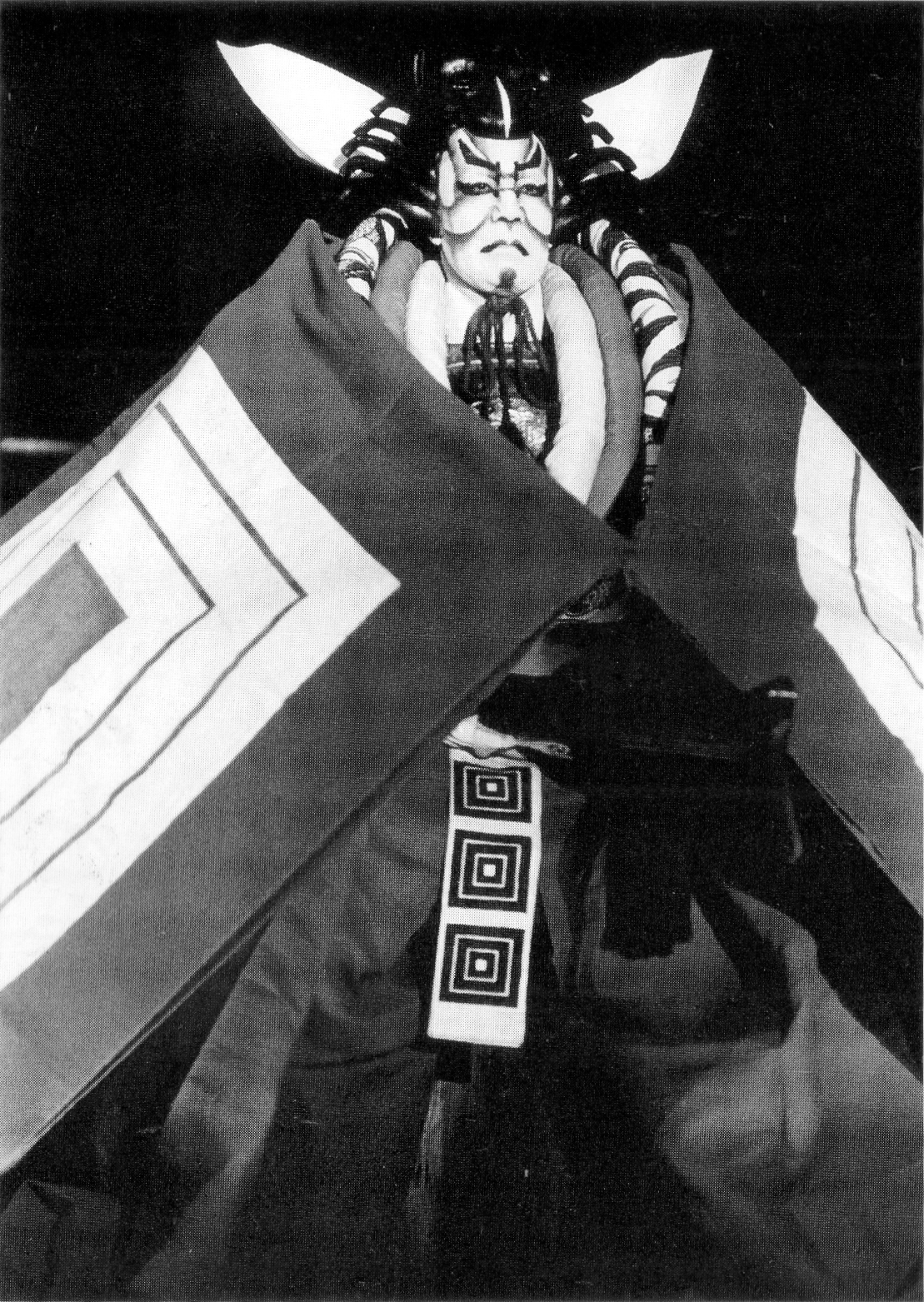
Actor Matsumoto Kōshirō VIII in kumadori makeup in the same role, 1953

Kumadori
The distinctive face makeup patterns (隈取) used in kabuki, featuring bold lines and colors that represent different character types. Red lines indicate passion and heroism, while blue represents evil or supernatural beings.
Kumadori styles
The principal patterns of kumadori (隈取) face makeup in kabuki include:
- Ni-hon-Guma (ニ本隈, "two lines") - Two red lines extending into the hairline from eyebrows and eyeline, expressing quiet heroic strength.
- Sugi-Guma (筋隈) - The iconic red-lined pattern worn by heroes like Kamakura Gongoro in Shibaraku, representing righteous anger and power.
- Mukimi Kuma (むきみ隈) - Refined red patterns for young, handsome heroes, exemplified by Sukeroku's makeup in Sukeroku Yukari no Edo Zakura.
- Zare-Guma (ざれ隈, "playful" kumadori) - Comic villain patterns using red lines to create animal-like appearances, indicating non-serious characters.
- Kuge Kuma (公家隈) - Blue patterns for villainous court aristocrats, similar in design to sugi-guma but using blue to indicate malevolent intent.
Kuichaa
A traditional dance form from the Yaeyama Islands, characterized by its slow, graceful movements and accompanying songs.
Kumi Odori
A form of musical theater (組踊) developed in the Ryukyu Kingdom (modern-day Okinawa) in the early 18th century. Combines elements of Noh, kabuki, and local Ryukyuan performing arts, featuring distinctive music, dance, and costume styles.

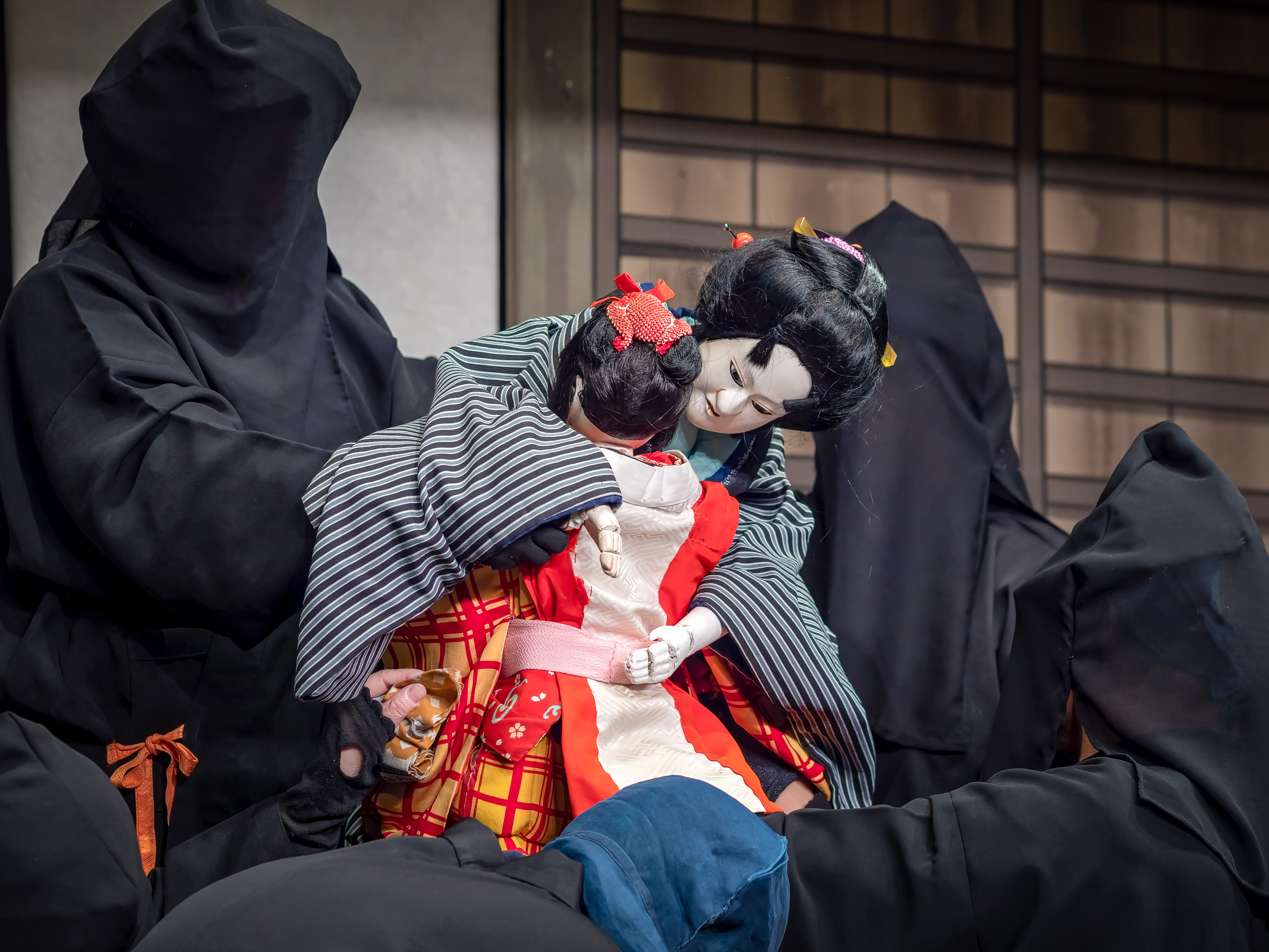
Kuroko in Bunraku performance

Kuroko
Stage assistants (黒子) in Japanese theater who wear all-black clothing and hoods. By theatrical convention, they are considered invisible while they move props, assist with costumes, and manage stage effects. Most prominent in kabuki theater, where they work in full view of the audience while maintaining the theatrical illusion.
Kurumabin
Distinctive wig style (車鬢) for aragoto roles, featuring hair bundles tied at the sides of the face, classified by number of bundles (five or seven).
Kusemai
A dramatic dance-song tradition (曲舞) that emerged in the 14th century, characterized by its strong rhythmic patterns and narrative content. Kusemai significantly influenced the development of Noh theater, particularly its musical elements and dance sequences. The form features a distinctive curved or winding movement pattern that gave it its name.
Kyo Odori
Spring dance performances (京おどり) by the Miyagawacho geiko district, held in early April.

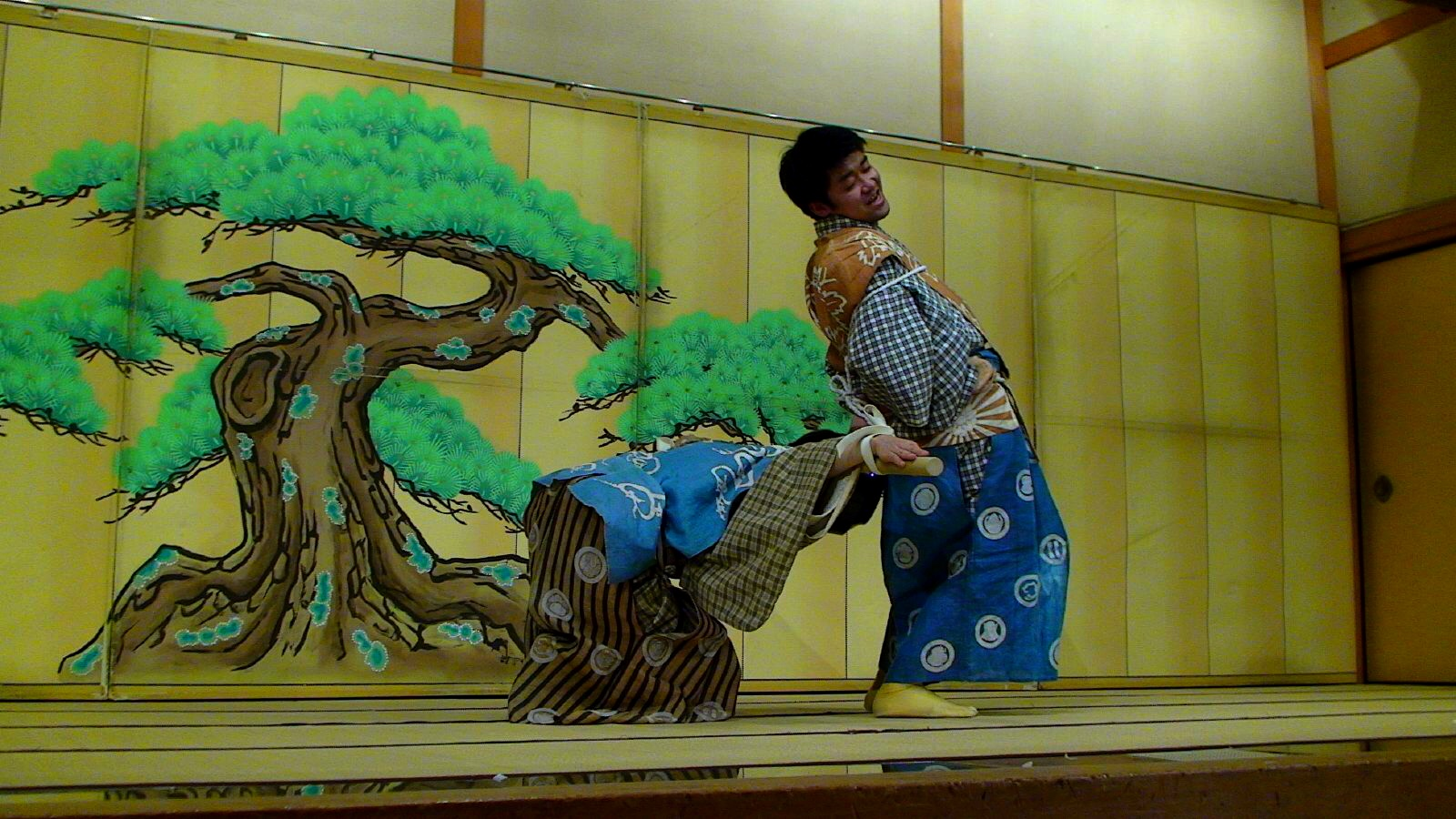
Kyogen performance

Kyōgen
A form of traditional comic theater that developed as an intermission and comic relief between Noh plays. Features mime, slapstick, and dialogue in a relatively colloquial Japanese language.

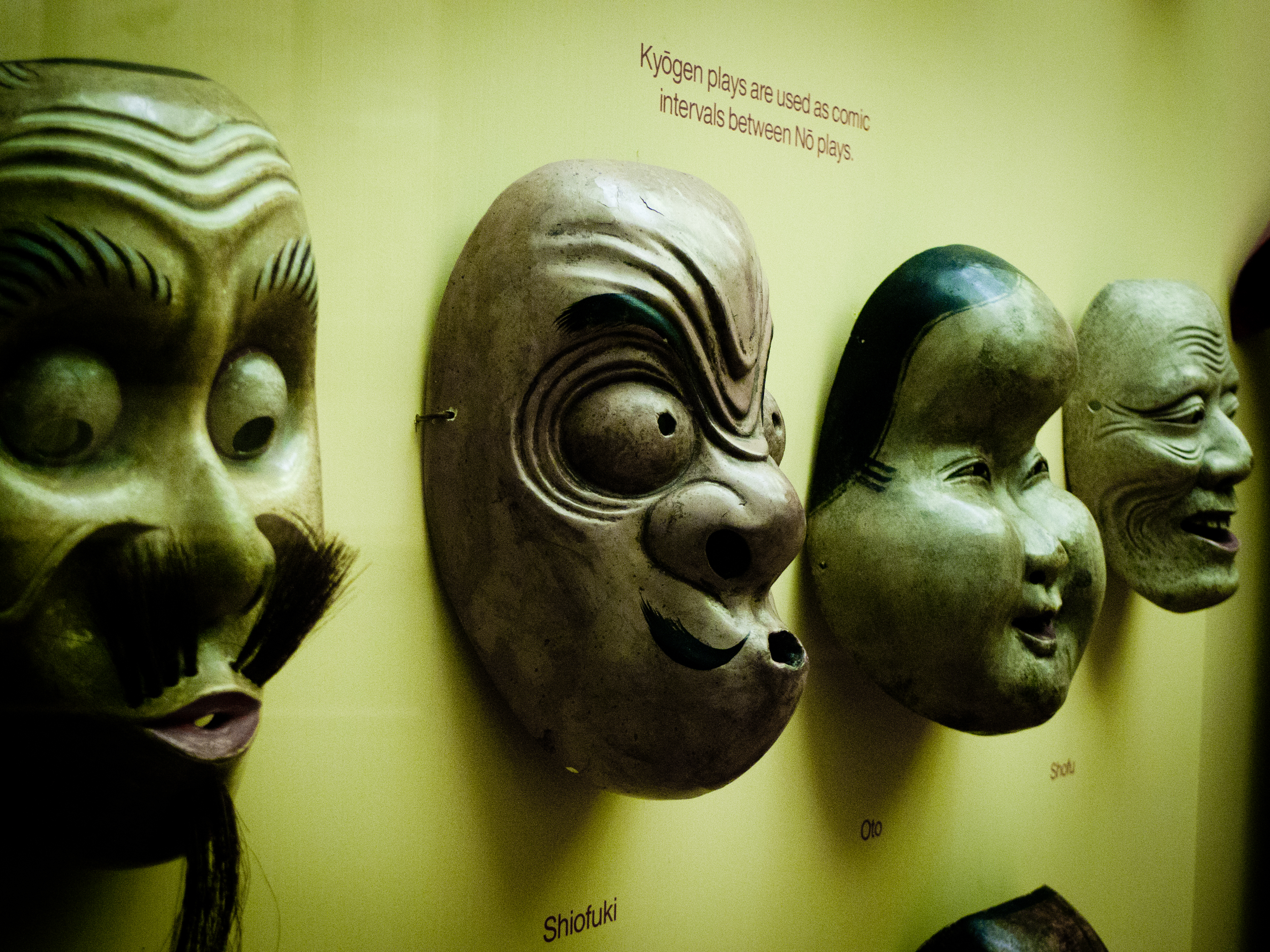
Kyogen masks

Kyogen mask
Masks used in Kyogen theater (狂言面, kyogen-men), worn less frequently than in Noh. Primary types include:
- Buaku (武悪) - A mask for mischievous servant characters with bulging eyes and wrinkled features
- Usofuki (嘘吹き) - Used for supernatural characters, featuring puffed cheeks
- Kitsune (狐) - Fox mask used for shape-shifting fox spirits
- Saru (猿) - Monkey mask for various animal plays
- Nushi (主) - Old man mask used for master characters
Unlike Noh masks, Kyogen masks are used primarily for non-human characters and comic roles, as most human characters perform unmasked to allow for more expressive facial reactions.
Kyōgen Sakusha
Professional kabuki playwrights (狂言作者) who emerged during the Genroku period as plays became more complex.
Kyōran mono
A subcategory of Noh plays (狂乱物, "madness plays") depicting characters experiencing mental anguish or psychological breakdown.

== M ==
Ma
The concept of negative space or silence (間) in Noh music and performance, considered essential to the dramatic and musical structure.
Maiko
Apprentice geiko (舞妓, "dancing child") who undergo years of training in traditional arts before becoming full geiko, typically beginning around age 15.
Manzai
A traditional Japanese comedy, a style of owarai, usually performed by a duo, (manzaishi)—a straight man (tsukkomi) and a funny man (boke)—trading jokes at great speed. Most of the jokes revolve around mutual misunderstandings, double-talk, puns and other verbal gags.
Matsubame Mono
Plays performed using the matsubame stage setting (松羽目物), featuring a painted pine tree backdrop imitating noh theater stages. Popular in adapting noh and kyōgen works to kabuki, especially during Meiji and Taishō periods.
Mawari Butai
Revolving stage (廻り舞台) allowing quick scene changes by rotating 180 degrees to reveal new settings. Originally was manually operated from below stage (naraku).
Meriyasu
A type of music and dance style in kabuki (メリヤス), characterized by its light, rhythmic quality and often used in dance sequences.
Metsukebashira
The "gazing pillar" (見付柱) on the Noh stage, located at upstage left. Used by performers as a positioning marker.
Michiyuki
A poetic travel sequence (道行, "path going") found in multiple forms of Japanese theater, particularly Noh and kabuki. In Noh, it refers to a journey scene where characters describe their travel through specific locations, often incorporating references to classical poetry and famous places (utamakura). In kabuki, michiyuki evolved into a specialized type of love-suicide scene where doomed lovers undertake a final journey together. The michiyuki combines physical movement, poetic description, and musical accompaniment to create a heightened emotional atmosphere, often serving as a crucial dramatic turning point in the performance.
Michiyuki Buyō
Dance pieces (道行舞踊) depicting characters' journeys, typically featuring pairs (lovers, parent-child, or master-servant) accompanied by takemoto, tokiwazu, or kiyomoto music.
Mie
A dramatic pose (見得) struck by actors at moments of emotional intensity in kabuki plays. The actor freezes in a powerful, expressive position while the drum roll builds tension. Specific types include:
- Genroku Mie - horizontal right arm, raised left arm with wide stance
- Ishinage no Mie - stone-throwing pose
- Hashiramaki no Mie - body wrapped around a pillar or weapon
- Tenchi no Mie - coordinated poses between actors at different heights
- Fudo no Mie - poses imitating Fudo Myoo deity
Mitate-e
A genre of ukiyo-e, that employs allusions and puns. Related to theater, it means depiction of real performers in roles they had not performed.

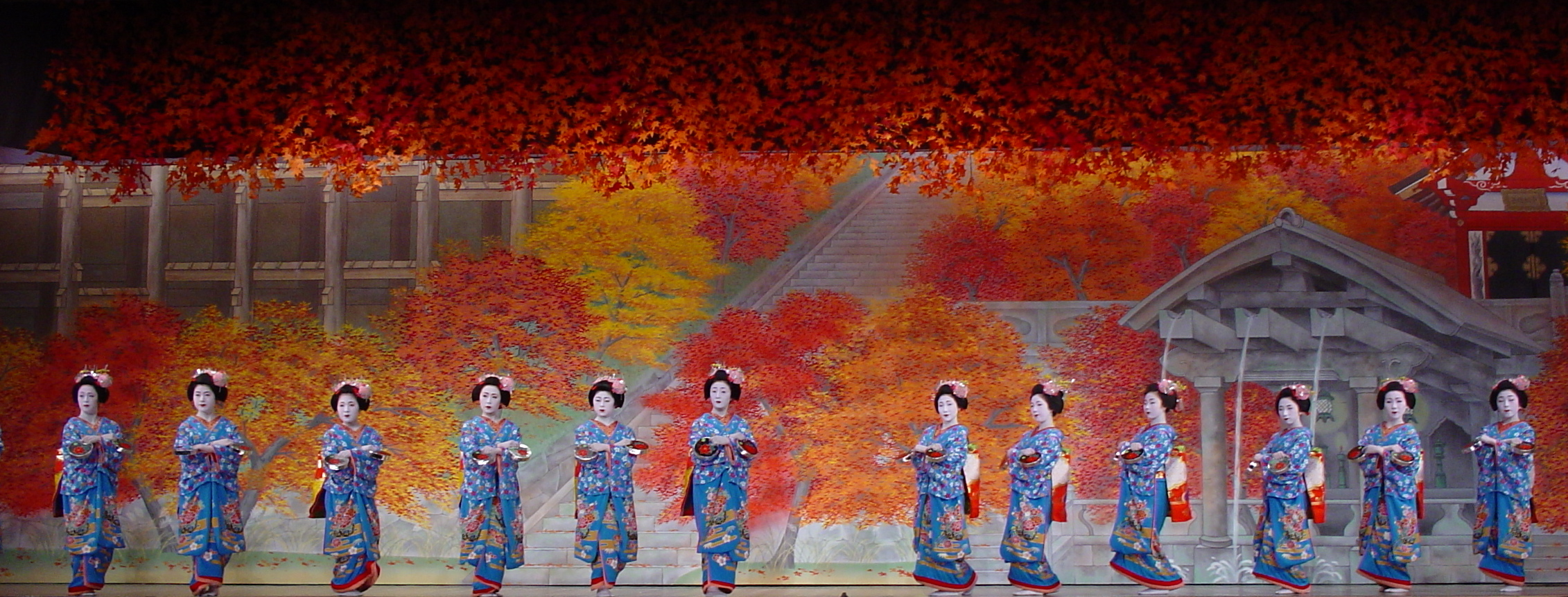
Miyako Odori

Miyako Odori
The most famous annual geiko dance performances (都をどり, "Capital City Dances") held in April by Gion Kobu district, featuring elaborate costumes and traditional choreography.
Mizugoromo
A three-quarter-length overgarment (水衣, "water garment") worn in Noh theater. Made from yore, a distressed plain-weave cloth with displaced wefts, creating a ragged appearance. Though used for various roles, it's particularly associated with suffering ghosts and destitute characters.
Mizu-shōbai
The "water trade" (水商売), referring to entertainment and hospitality professions without fixed salaries, including traditional performers like geisha and kabuki actors, as well as modern entertainment industry workers. The term reflects the fluid, unstable nature of income in these professions.

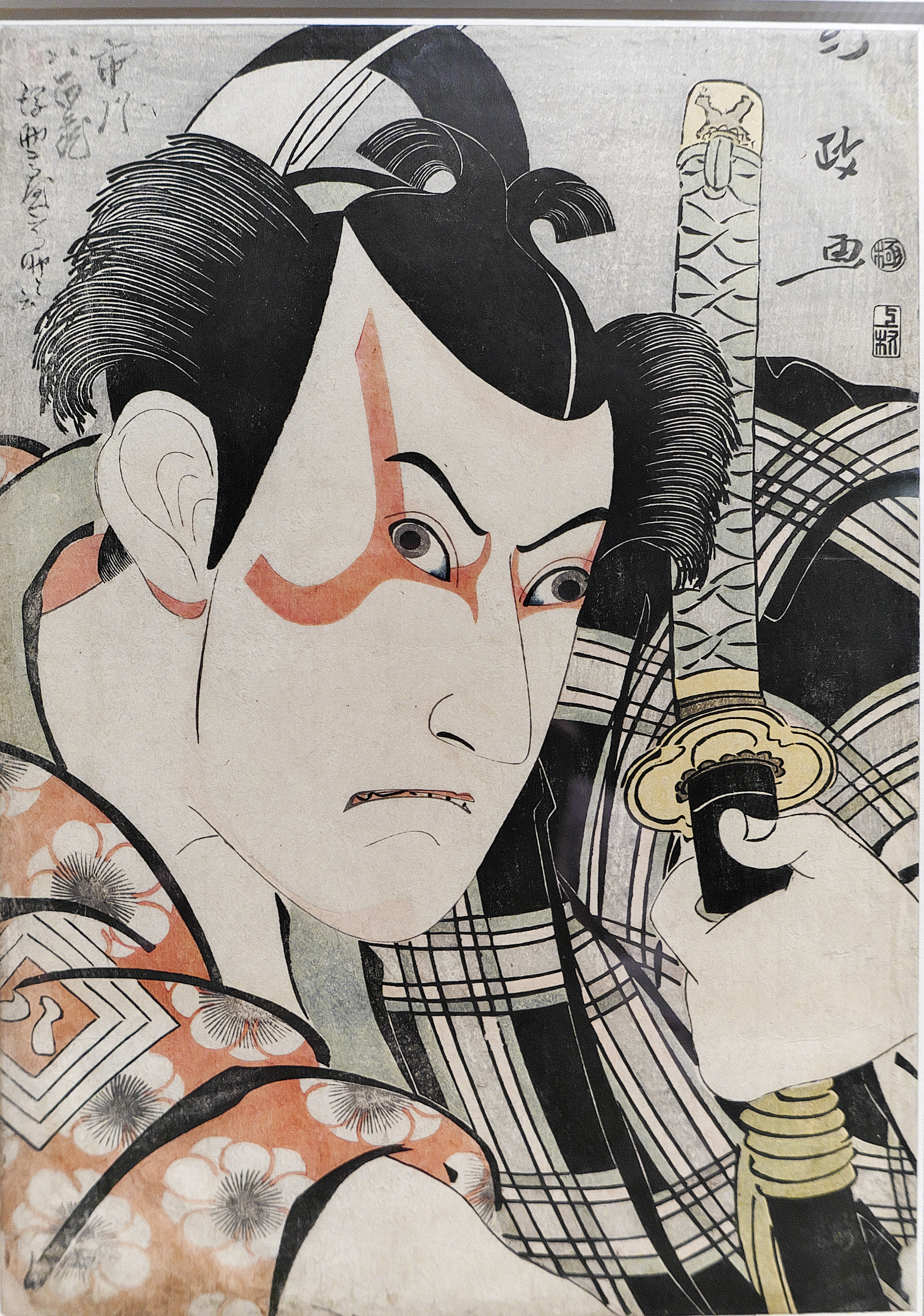
The mon on the right sleeve of the kimono of Kabuki actor Ichikawa Yaozo III, dressed as Umeōmaru. The kanji 八, meaning 'eight', is written within the triple square. Print by Utagawa Kunimasa, 1796.

Mon
Family crests or emblems (紋) used on costumes and props in kabuki to identify characters' social status and family affiliations.
Monogatari
a literary form in traditional Japanese literature; an extended narrative tale comparable to epic literature.
Monomane
The principle of artistic imitation in Noh (物真似), focusing on accurate representation of roles and actions. While sometimes contrasted with yūgen, it is considered part of a continuous spectrum of performance techniques rather than its opposite. Monomane emphasizes the intent to accurately depict the motions of a role, as opposed to purely aesthetic reasons for abstraction or embellishment.
Mugen Noh
A category of Noh plays (夢幻能, "supernatural Noh") featuring supernatural beings, ghosts, or spirits, characterized by non-linear time progression and multiple timeframes.
Mushin
A state of "no-mind" (無心) that Noh actors strive to achieve, where they transcend conscious thought to reach perfect performance. Essential for developing hana.
Myō
An aesthetic quality in Noh performance (妙, "charm") achieved when an actor transcends mere imitation to embody their role completely. Myō represents the state where an actor performs flawlessly and without any sense of imitation, effectively becoming the role they are portraying.

== N ==
Nagauta
Long-form musical narrative (長唄, "long song") used in kabuki theater, performed with shamisen accompaniment. Features extended storytelling through song with complex musical arrangements.
Nembutsu
A traditional Buddhist performance art of the Heian period (念仏踊り, nembutsu odori) combining dance with chanted prayers. Exists in two main forms: one where dancers and chanters are separate, and dancing nembutsu (踊り念仏) where performers both dance and chant Buddhist invocations simultaneously. Originally religious, it evolved into entertainment during the Muromachi period, combining love songs with prayer chants, and influenced early kabuki.
Nigao-e
A genre of ukiyo-e, portrait prints (似顔絵) of kabuki actors, typically bust-view images capturing distinctive facial features for easy recognition.

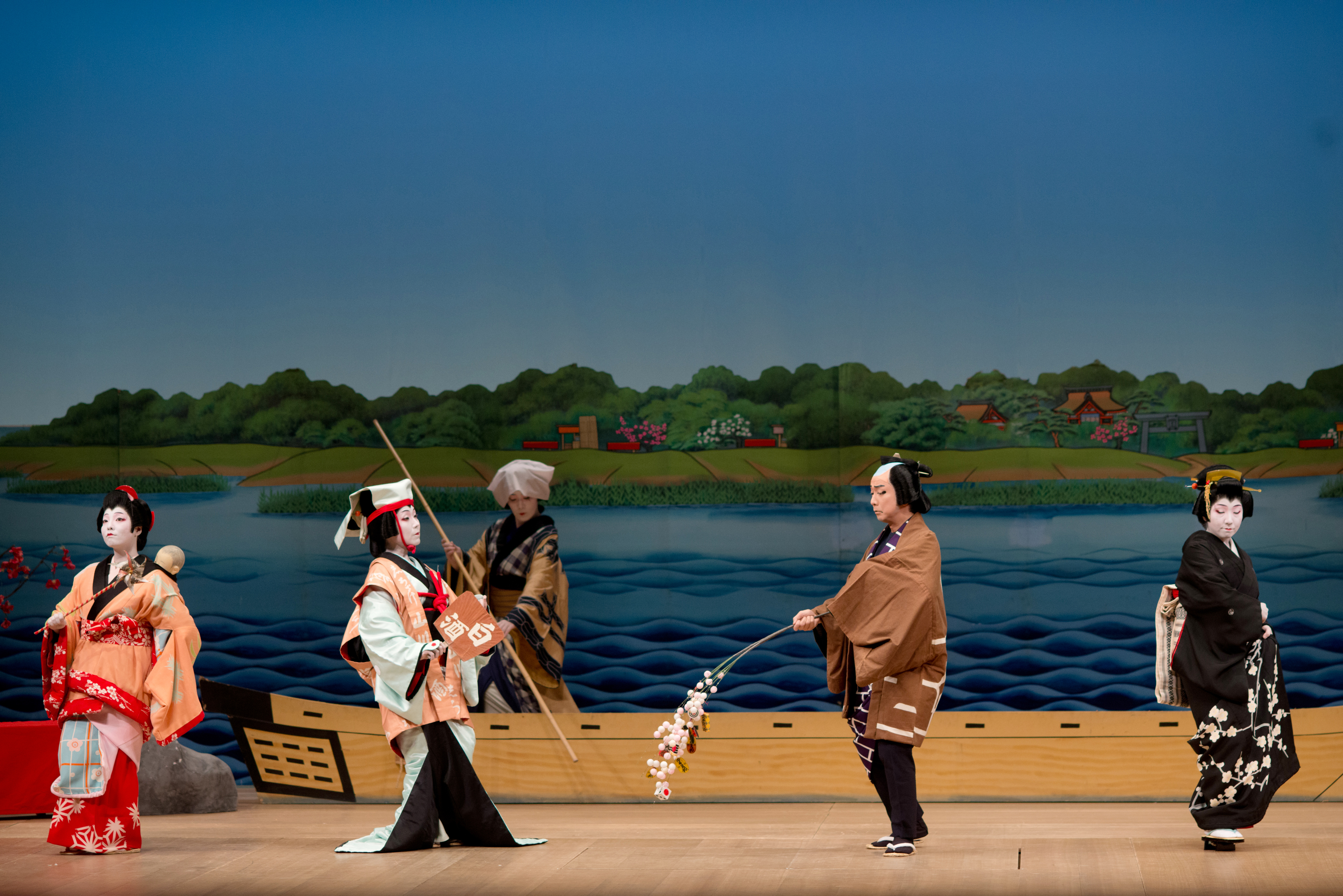
Nihon-buyo: dancers in the play Noriai bune.

Nihon-buyō
Traditional Japanese dance (日本舞踊) that forms an essential part of kabuki performance, combining elements from Noh, folk dance, and other movement traditions. Emphasizes grace, subtle movement, and the expression of poetic imagery through choreography.
Nimaime
Handsome male role type in kabuki (二枚目) with white face makeup, named for being listed on the second billing board in Edo-period theaters.
Ninjō-banashi
Erotic stories (人情噺) performed in the yose theater tradition, focusing on human emotions, relationships, and love affairs. These narratives often explored the conflict between social obligations (giri) and human feelings (ninjō).
Ningyōburi
Ningyōburi (人形振り) is a style of kabuki acting where the actor imitates the exaggerated motions of a puppet. Often, one or two actors as puppeteers appear behind the main actor and mime controlling that actor's movements. These puppeteers often dress in black (like kurogo). This technique is mostly used in kabuki plays derived from puppet theater plays.
Nōgaku
The general term for Noh and Kyōgen theater together, recognized by UNESCO as an Intangible Cultural Heritage. Encompasses both the serious, symbolic Noh drama and the comic Kyōgen interludes.

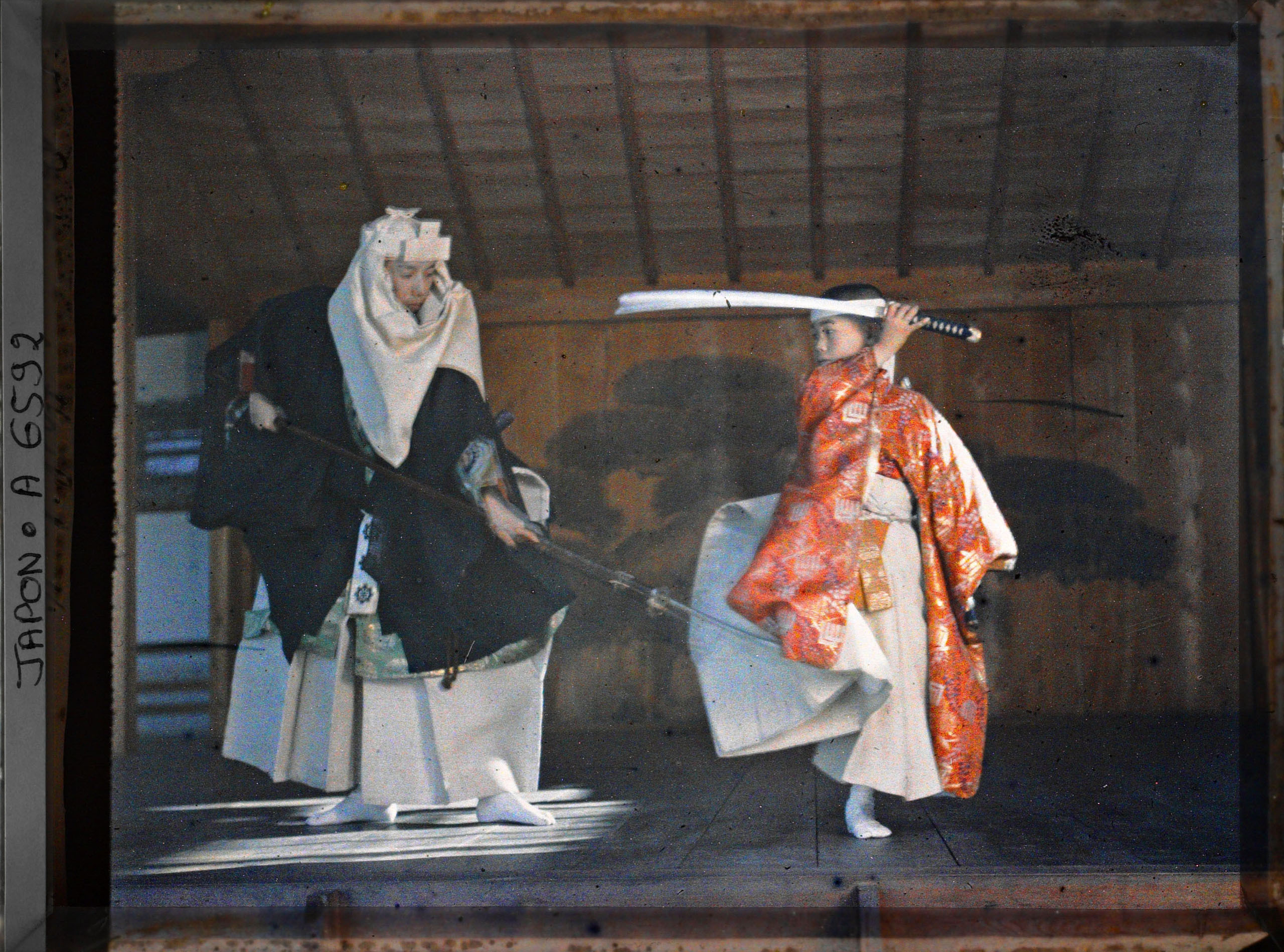
Noh theater: fight between Benkei and Minamoto Yoshitsune from the play Hashi-Benkei. Photo by Stephane Passet for the Archives of the Planet, 1912

Noh
The oldest surviving form of Japanese theater, originating in the 14th century. Characterized by masked performers, slow and stylized movement, poetic text, and accompaniment by a chorus (jiutai) and instrumental ensemble.
Noh actors
There are five roles in the Noh theater: main actor, usually masked, shite (and sometimes a companion actor, shite-tsura), secondary actor waki (and sometimes a companion, wakizura), a chorus, jiutai, a child actor role, kokata, and a non-performing, senior actor, kōken, who helps the shite. An actor who plays between the first and the second parts of the performance is called ai-kyōgen.
Noh-bayashi
The traditional musical ensemble of Noh theater (能囃子), consisting of three drummers and a flutist who provide accompaniment throughout the performance.

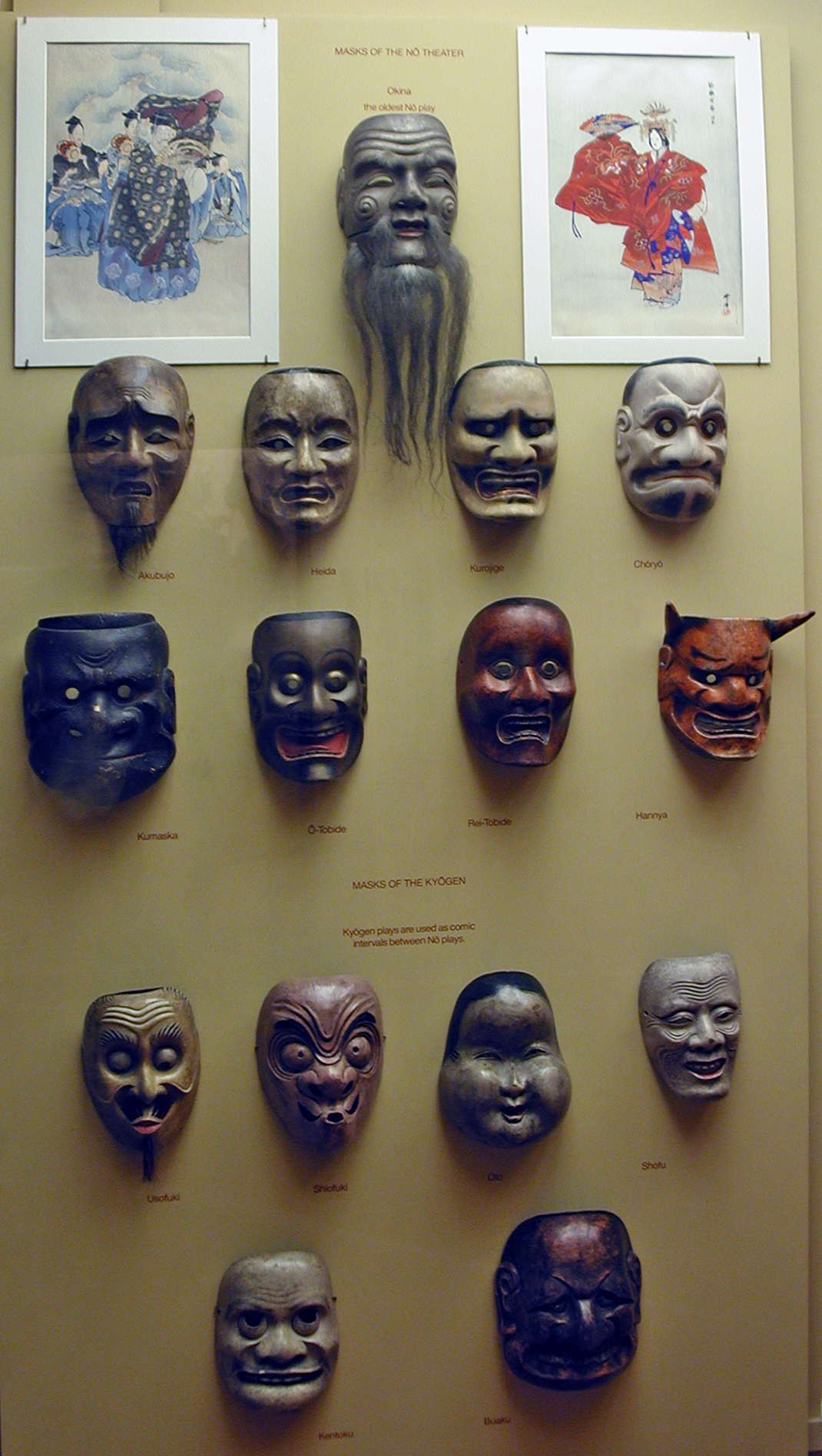
Noh and Kyogen masks

Noh masks
Carved wooden masks (能面, nōmen) essential to Noh theater, with approximately 450 different types divided into major categories based on age, gender, and social status. The main shite (protagonist) typically wears a mask, while the waki (supporting actor) performs unmasked. These masks are considered sacred objects and are handled with reverence, with specific rituals for their donning and use. The subtle changes in a mask's expression are achieved through the actor's movements and shifts in angle relative to lighting, a technique called "tilting the mask" (曲見, kurume). Despite their fixed features, master actors can make masks appear to express varying emotions through subtle head movements and control of lighting angles.
Noh stage
The traditional Noh stage, or butai (舞台), characterized by its distinctive architectural features including an independent roof and four named pillars. The stage is designed to create complete openness between performers and audience.
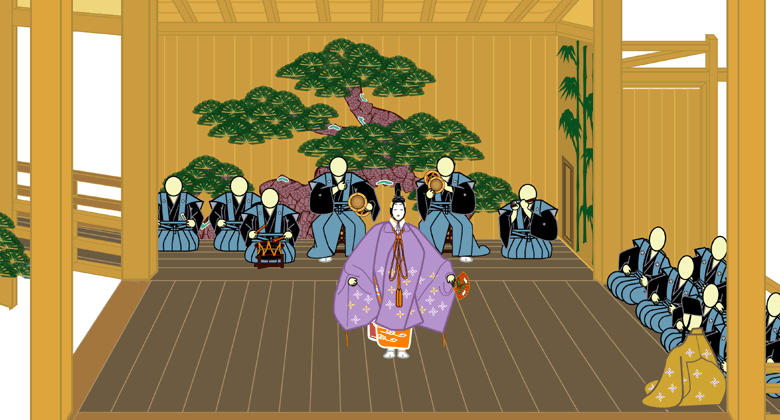
Positions of players on a Noh stage.
Center: shite (main actor) wearing a Noh mask and holding fan.
Front right: waki.
Right: eight-person jiutai (chorus).
Back: four hayashikata (musicians), from right to left: fue (flute), kozutsumi (shoulder drum), ohzutsumi (hip drum) and taiko.
Left rear: two kohken (stage hands).

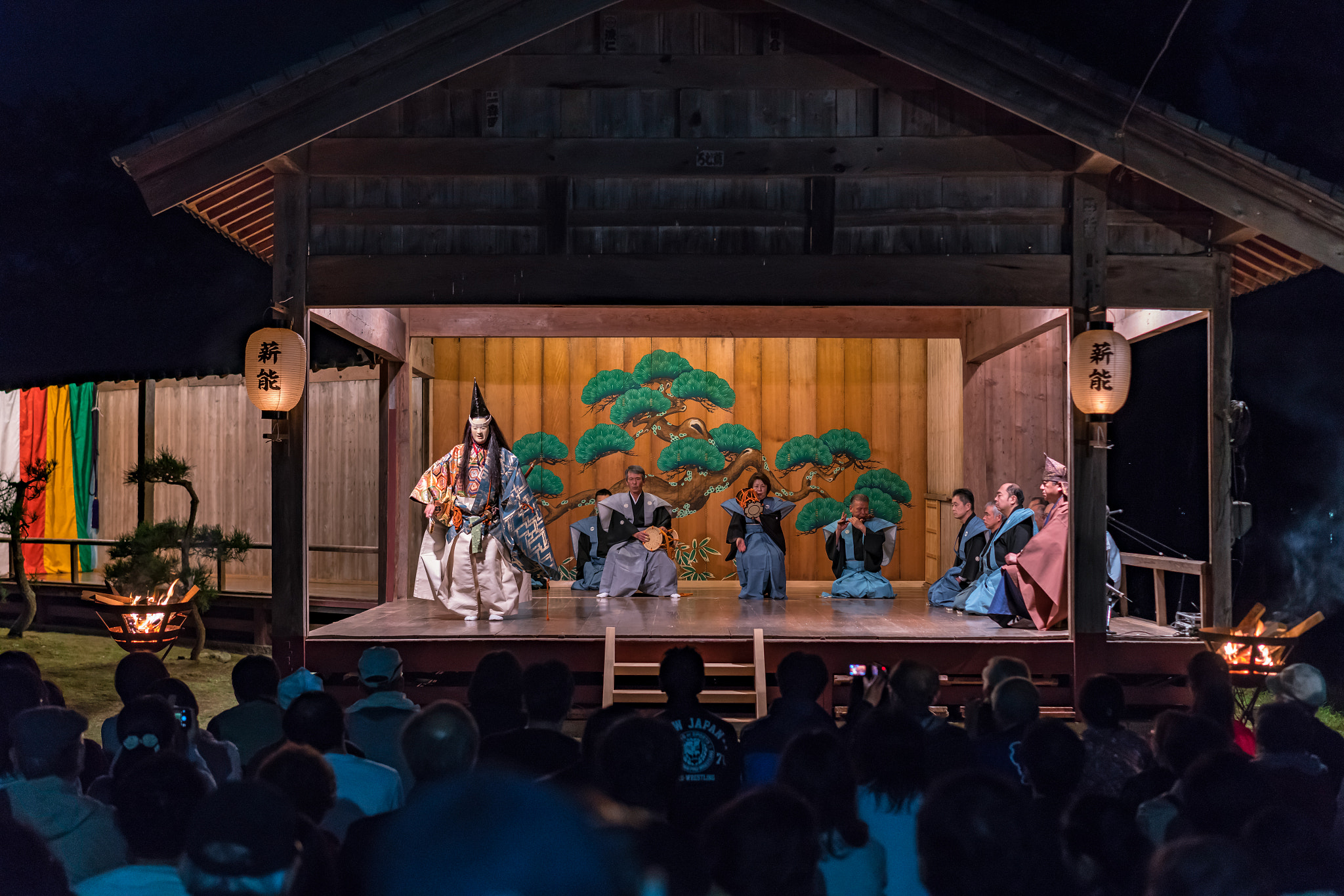
Noh performance
Nōkan
A 40 cm bamboo flute (能管) producing distinctive high-pitched tones, used in both nagauta and geza music.
Nuigurumi
Full-body animal costumes (縫ぐるみ) used for portraying animals in kabuki.

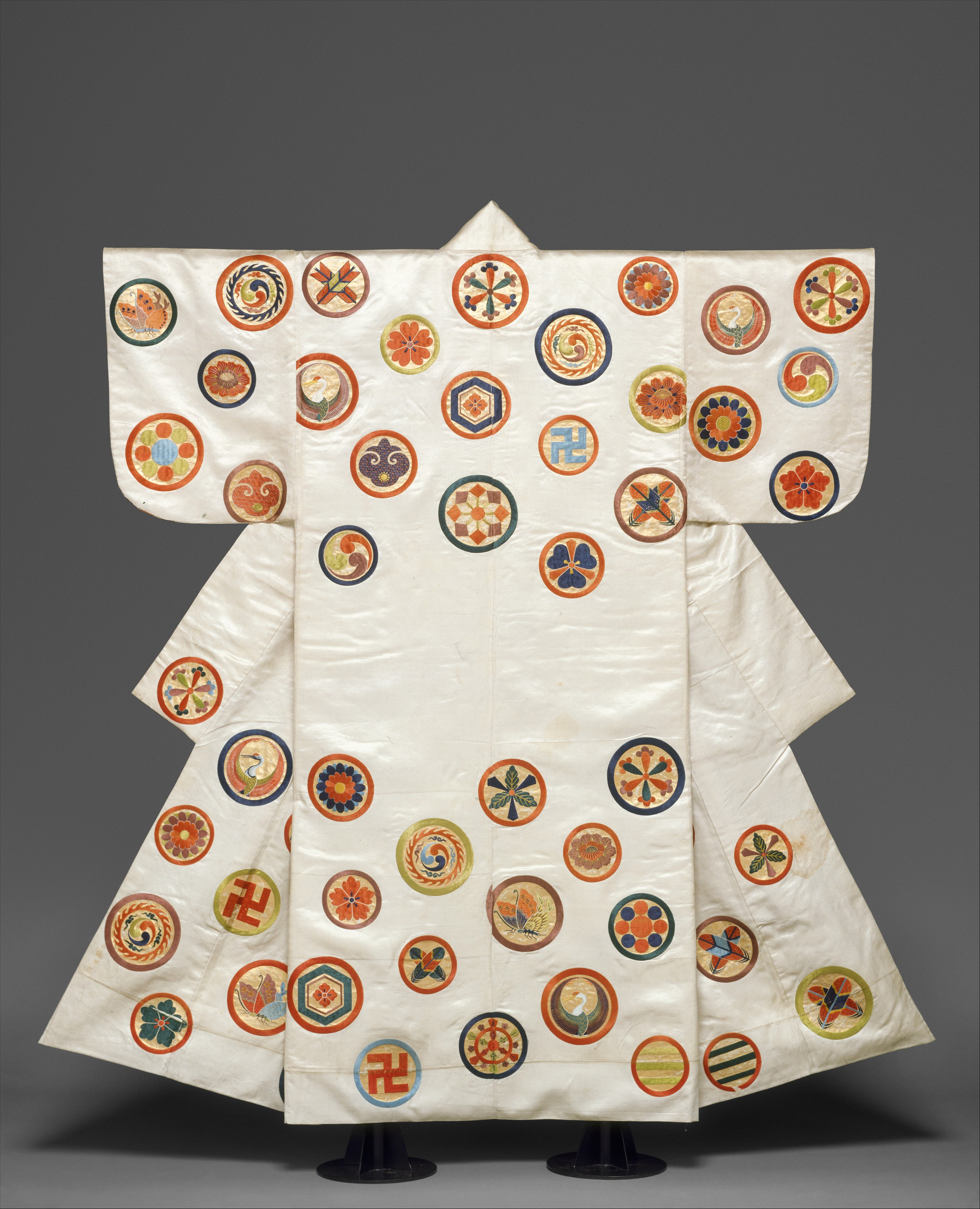
Nuihaku with scattered crests

Nuihaku
A short-sleeved kimono (縫箔) with elaborate embroidery used in Noh.
Nureba
Stylized love scenes (濡れ場) performed with narration and music accompaniment. Uses indirect expression techniques like kamisuki, avoiding explicit portrayal of passion.
Nuregoto
Kabuki plays focusing on passion and romance (濡れ事), emphasizing character development and dialogue over spectacle.

== O ==
Odori
Traditional Japanese dance (をどり/踊り) as performed by geiko and maiko, characterized by precise, graceful movements and strict adherence to established forms.
Okayama
A traditional dance style from Okayama Prefecture, featuring distinctive local characteristics and often performed at regional festivals.
Okina
A special ritual performance (翁) combining dance with Shinto ceremonies, considered the oldest type of Noh play and typically performed at the beginning of special programs.
Omigoromo
A theatrical costume (小忌衣) specifically designed for high-ranking characters like shoguns, featuring elaborate embroidery, an extended hem that trails on the ground, and a distinctive upturned collar.
Onikenbai
A "devil's sword dance" (鬼剣舞), A ritual dance featuring performers in demon masks wielding swords, often performed at temples and shrines to ward off evil spirits (oni). The dance was popular in northeastern Japan, and usually employed eight dancers.
Onna Budō
Female martial arts roles (女武道) in kabuki, depicting women skilled in combat while maintaining feminine grace and modesty.

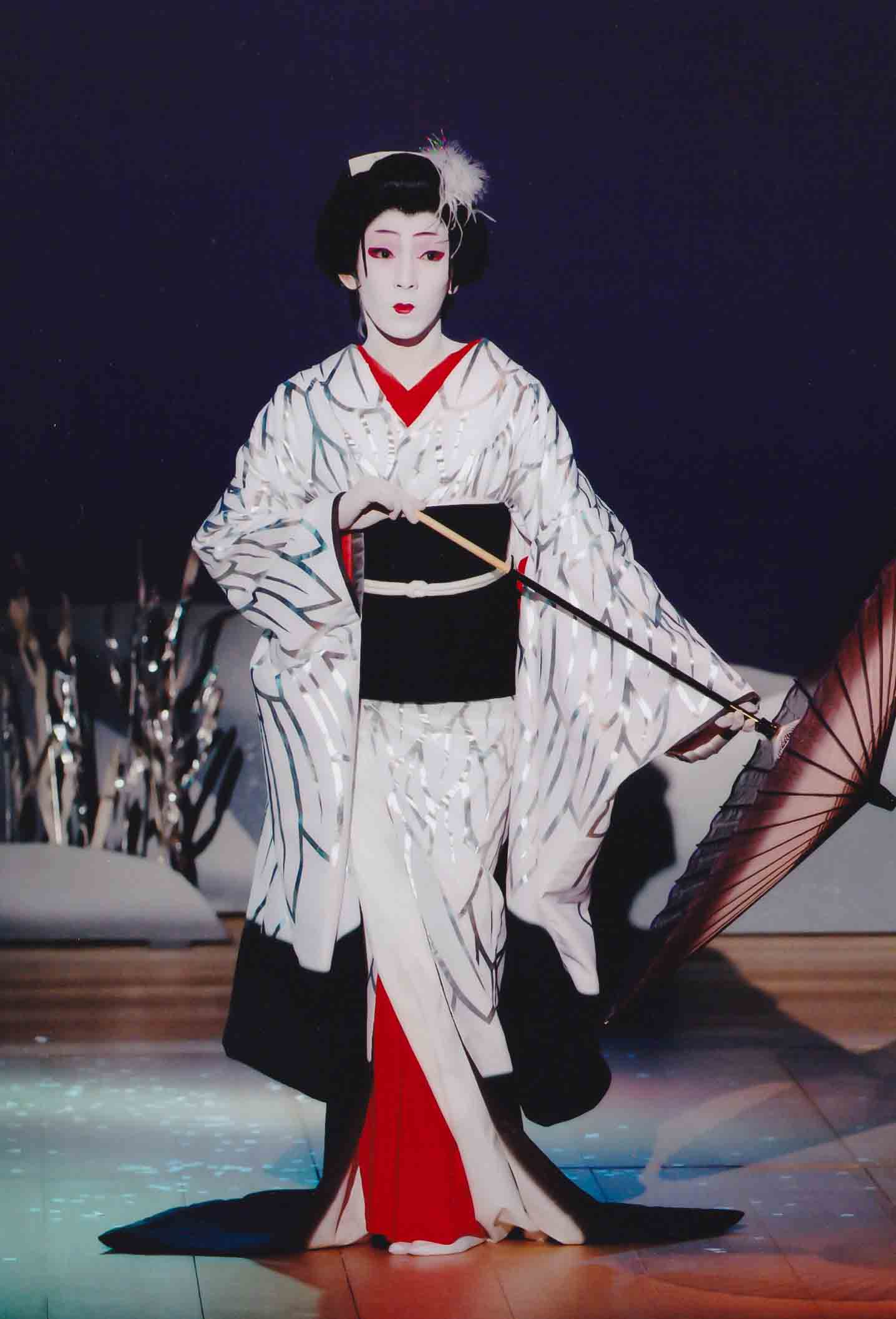
Sagimusume (Heron Maiden) dance performed by onnagata Akifusa Guraku

Onnagata
Male actors who specialize in playing female roles in kabuki theater. They employ sophisticated techniques to create the appearance and mannerisms of female characters.
Onna Kabuki
Early form of kabuki (女歌舞伎) performed by women between 1603 and 1629, before being banned for moral reasons. Distinguished by use of shamisen and courtesans performing male roles.
Onna no kusemai
Another name for women's kusemai performances (女曲舞, literally "woman's curved dance"), identical to jokyokumai. These performances featured women adopting male dress and performing pieces from the kusemai repertoire, similar to how shirabyōshi performers would cross-dress in their performances.
Onryō mono
A subcategory of Noh plays (怨霊物, "vengeful ghost plays") featuring the spirits of those who died with strong resentments or unresolved emotions.
Onryōgoto
Plays about vengeful ghosts (怨霊事).
Ōshibai
Major licensed kabuki theaters (大芝居) of the Edo period in major cities.
Oshiguma
A face print (押隈) made by pressing rice paper against an actor's face after a performance to record their kumadori makeup pattern. These prints became collectible items for fans.

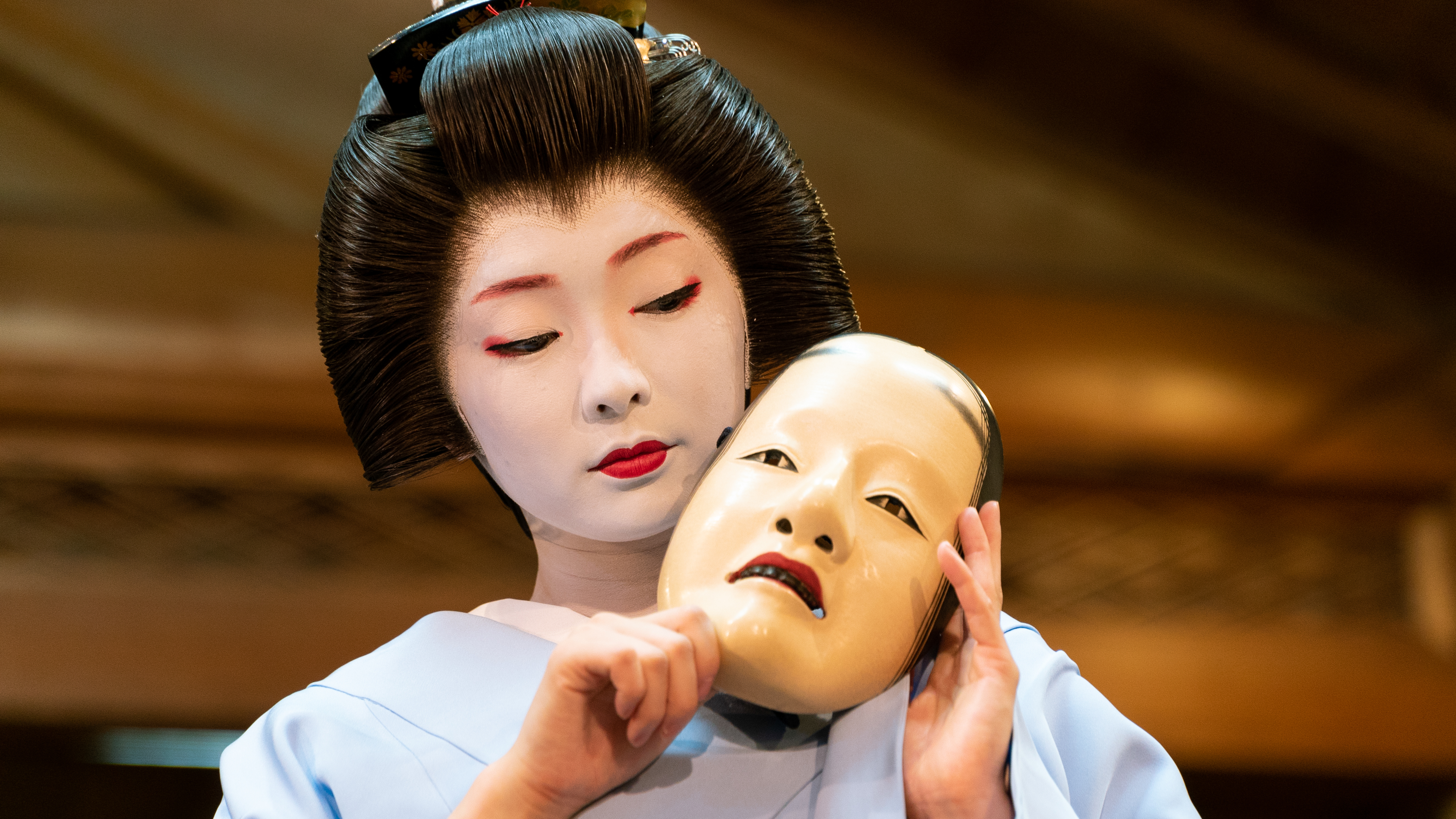
Kyoto geisha Toshimana holding a Nōh mask, wearing full make-up and a katsura (wig).

Oshiroi
The white foundation makeup (白粉) used in kabuki theater, applied as a base layer before other makeup elements. This distinctive white makeup symbolizes the theatrical nature of kabuki and creates a blank canvas for additional character makeup.
Ōtsuzumi
Also known as ōkawa (大皮), a hip drum used in Noh theater's hayashi ensemble, characterized by its deeper tone and played while placed on the performer's hip.
Owarai
A broad word (お笑い) used to describe Japanese comedy as seen on television.
Oyajigata
Roles depicting elderly men (親仁方) in kabuki.

== P ==
Pintokona
A wagoto role type (ぴんとこな) combining soft charm with samurai toughness, distinct from purely feminine tsukkorobashi roles.

== R ==
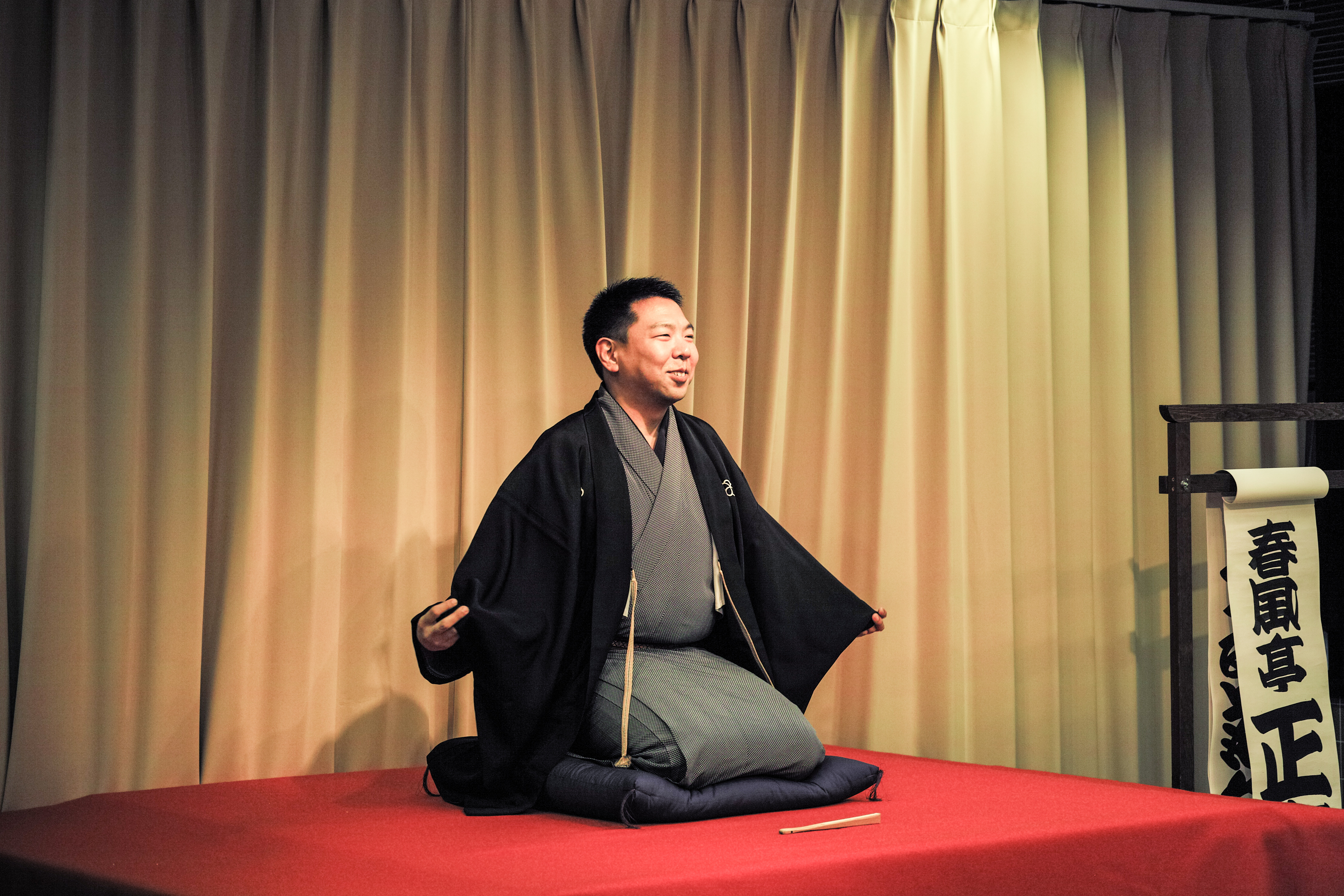
Rakugo performance

Rakugo
A form of verbal entertainment where a lone storyteller (rakugoka) sits on stage and tells a comic monologue using only a fan and a hand towel as props. Rakugo styles include shibaibanashi (芝居噺, theatre discourses), ongyokubanashi (音曲噺, musical discourses), kaidanbanashi (怪談噺, ghost discourses), and ninjōbanashi (人情噺, sentimental discourses).
Rien
Term for the kabuki community (梨園, "Pear Garden"), derived from the Chinese Emperor Xuanzong's imperial garden where performers trained.
Rōjaku
The highest stage of Noh performance development (老弱, "old and tranquil"), characterized by the elimination of all unnecessary elements. In this stage, the performer eliminates all unnecessary action or sound, leaving only the true essence of the scene or action being imitated.
Rōkyoku
A form of traditional Japanese narrative singing (浪曲, also known as naniwa-bushi 浪花節) performed with shamisen accompaniment. The genre gained significant popularity in the early 20th century, featuring dramatic storytelling that often focused on historical tales and moral stories.
Roppō
Stylized exit techniques (六方) performed on the hanamichi, featuring distinctive arm movements and footwork. Types include tobi roppō (running), kitsune roppō (fox-like), keisei roppō (courtesan style), and oyogi roppō (swimming motions).
Ryōkake Noh
A hybrid category of Noh plays (両掛能) combining elements of both Genzai and Mugen Noh, with the first act set in the present and the second in the supernatural realm.

== S ==
Sabakiyaku
Roles portraying men of wisdom and integrity (裁き役) in kabuki.
Sammaime
Comic actors (三枚目), named for their traditional listing on the third placard outside Edo-period theaters. Often wear distinctive zareguma makeup and contribute comic relief to serious plays.
Sangaku
An early form of Japanese entertainment (散楽) that arrived from China during the Nara period. Similar to circus performances, it featured acrobatics, juggling, magic tricks, and other spectacle-based performances. These continental entertainments were performed at the imperial court and gradually evolved as they mixed with local traditions.
Sarugaku
A form of theater (猿楽, "monkey music") that flourished in Japan during the 11th to 14th centuries. Developing from sangaku, it combined comic skits, acrobatics, and dance with musical accompaniment. Sarugaku eventually split into two major branches: one became the serious, dramatic Noh theater, while the other developed into the comic Kyōgen tradition. The term "monkey music" may refer to the playful, entertaining nature of early performances.
Semeba
Scenes depicting the torture or persecution of virtuous characters, particularly common in sewamono plays of the late Edo period.
Senshūraku
The final day of a kabuki performance run (千秋楽/千穐楽), with the alternate writing avoiding the character for "fire" due to theatrical superstition.
Sewamono
Domestic plays (世話物) in kabuki dealing with contemporary life and relationships during the Edo period, often featuring merchants and townspeople rather than historical figures.

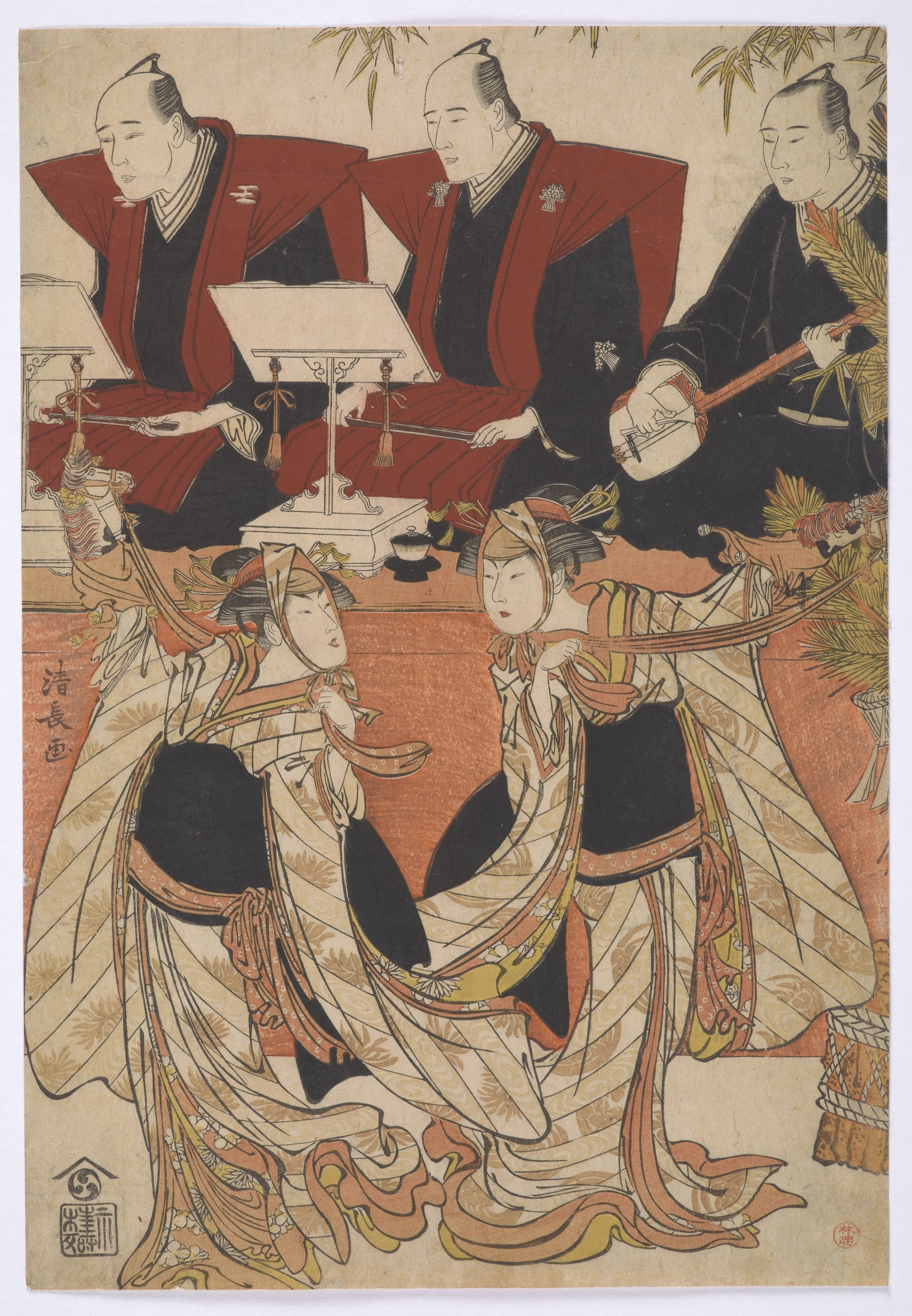
"Two Actors as Iwai Hyanshiro IV and Segawa Kikunojo III in the 'Karukoma' Dance" by Torii Kiyonaga, with a shamisen player on top of the print

Shamisen
A three-stringed plucked instrument (三味線) central to kabuki, bunraku, and other theatrical forms. Different styles and techniques are used depending on the genre and dramatic context.
Shibai-e
A genre of ukiyo-e, theatrical prints (芝居絵) depicting scenes from kabuki plays.
Shibai jaya
Theater teahouses (芝居茶屋) serving kabuki audiences.
Shibaraku
Short dramatic interludes (暫) lasting about fifty minutes, performed between longer plays to maintain audience interest.
Shidai
Opening musical passage in shosagoto (dance plays), adapted from noh theater traditions and typically played on the nohkan flute during character entrances.
Shikami
A type of Noh mask depicting a furious demon or angry spirit, characterized by its intensely wrinkled features and aggressive expression.
Shiki-sanban
Three traditional pieces performed at the beginning of a Noh program for ritual purification, consisting of Okina, Senzai, and Sambabō.
Shime-daiko
One of the three drums used in Noh theater, characterized by its small size and high, sharp tone.
Shin
Alternative reading of kokoro (心), referring to both "heart" and "mind" in Noh performance theory. Central to Zeami's teachings about performance and artistic development.
Shinbōya
A role (辛抱屋, "patient person") in kabuki depicting mild-mannered individuals who endure extreme suffering or cruelty, typically at the hands of the villain. These roles emphasize the character's patient endurance of hardship.
Shini-e
A genre of ukiyo-e, memorial or death prints (死絵) created upon an actor's death, featuring portraits and biographical information including posthumous names and final poems.
Shingeki
Modern theater movement that emerged in Japan in the early 20th century, focusing on realistic acting and contemporary themes, often adapting Western plays. Literally means "new theater."
Shin-kabuki
Modern kabuki plays (新歌舞伎) written since the Meiji period by playwrights not from the kabuki circles.
Shinpa
A theatrical form that emerged in the Meiji period as a bridge between traditional kabuki and modern shingeki. Known for melodramatic adaptations of contemporary novels and social themes.
Shinjū Shamisen
A form of musical theater performance featuring tragic love stories, accompanied by shamisen music. Often depicts double suicide stories that were popular during the Edo period.
Shirabyōshi
Female dancers (白拍子) of the late Heian and early Kamakura periods who performed in male dress. Their art combined dance, song, and poetry recitation. It influenced the later development of Noh theater.
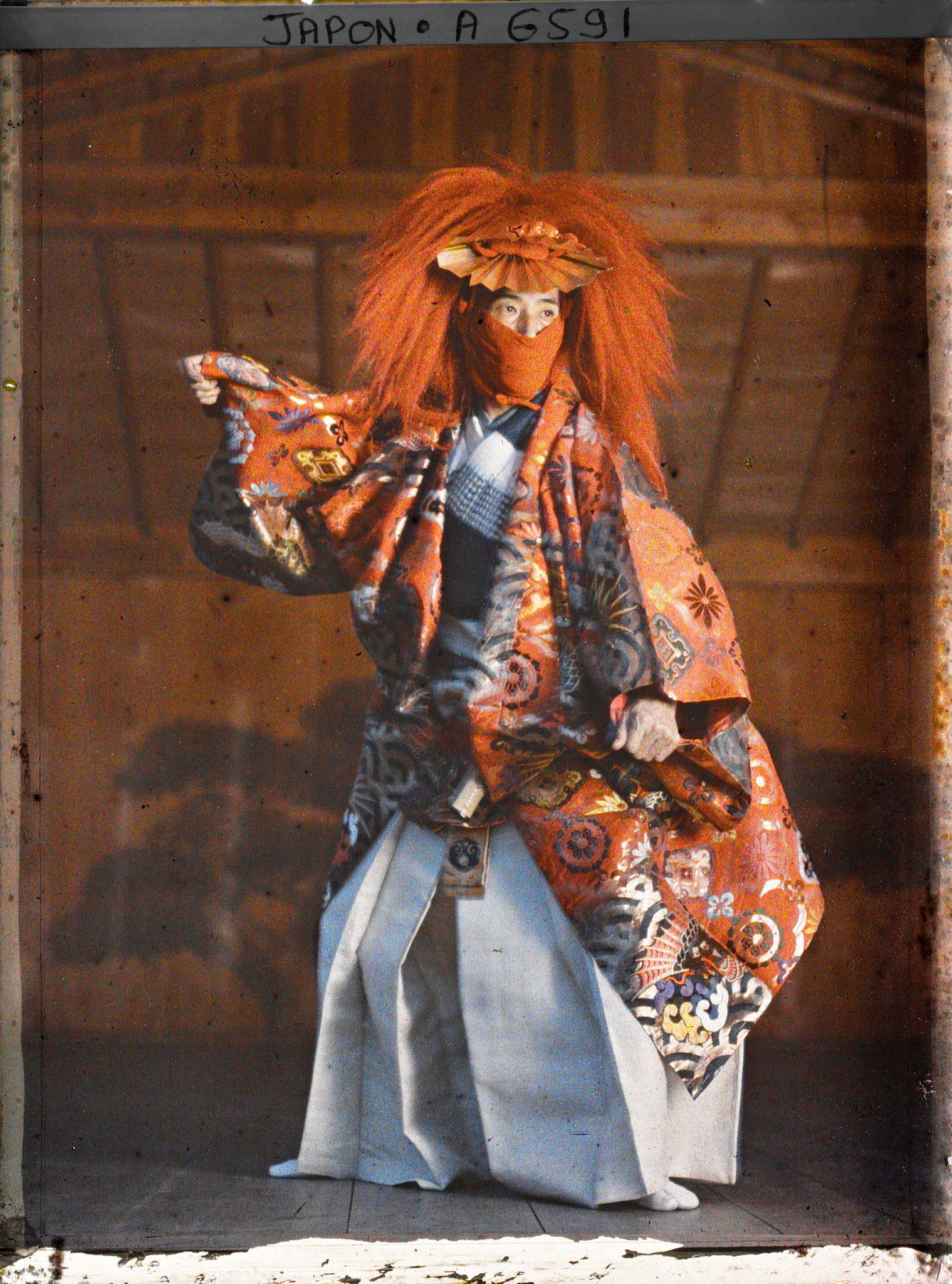
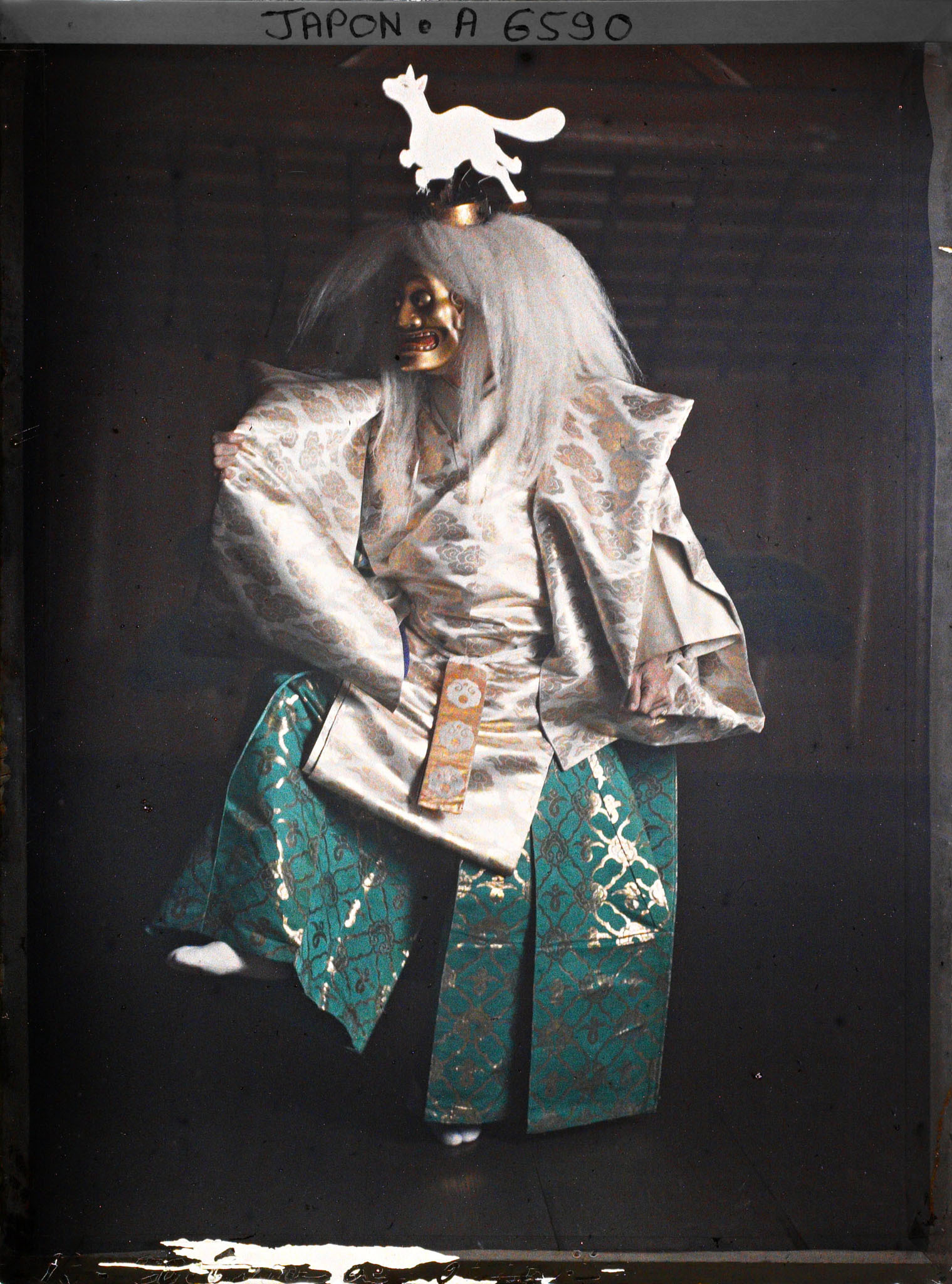
Left: shite of the play Mochizuki, playing Ozawa-no-Tomofusa.
Right: shite playing the character of Inari in the play Kokaji.
Photos by Stephane Passet for the Archives of the Planet, Kyoto, 1912.
Shite
The primary actor and soloist (仕手) in Noh plays, who usually perform in a Noh mask. The role is often of an otherworldly creature: a god, a demon, or a spirit of a dead person. Shite can have a companion actor, called shite-tsure. In the first act, shite is called mae-shite, and is often "a spirit who has assumed the form of a person"; in the second act, shite is called nochi-shite and can be "a ghost or apparition of the same spirit". Kōken is a senior, non-performing actor, who overviews the play and must take over if shite is unable to perform.
Shitebashira
The "main actor's pillar" (仕手柱) on the Noh stage, located at upstage right. Serves as a primary reference point for the shite's movements.
Shitetsure
The companion (仕手連れ) to the main character (shite) in Noh plays. Sometimes abbreviated as tsure when referring to both shitetsure and wakitsure.
Shishi-odori
A traditional folk dance (鹿踊り, "deer dance") from northern Japan, primarily preserved in Iwate, Miyagi, and Uwajima regions. Performers wear deer-head masks (shishi-gashira) with hanging cloth covering their upper bodies, and perform vigorous jumping movements imitating deer. Two main styles exist:
- Maku-odori: Dancers hold cloth curtains while separate musicians provide accompaniment, common in northern Iwate
- Taiko-odori: Dancers play waist-drums while performing, prevalent in southern Iwate, Miyagi, and Uwajima

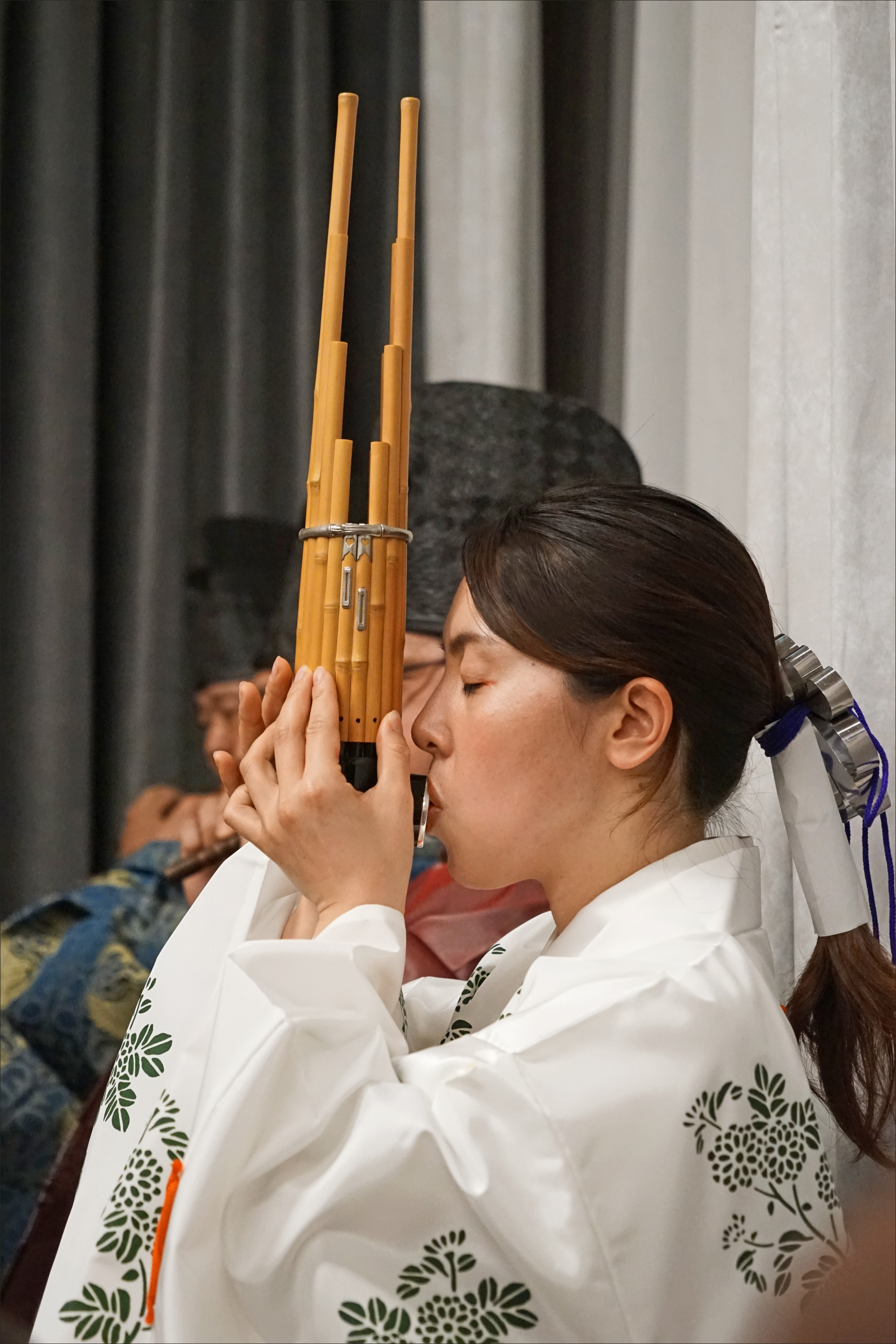
Gagaku musician playing sho

Shō
Musical instrument (笙) that consists of 17 bamboo pipes; one of the primary instruments of gagaku.
Shōjō
A type of Noh mask depicting a mythical sake-loving water spirit, characterized by its red coloring and generous expression.
Shosa
The distinctive movement style (所作) of kabuki dance, combining rural and urban folk elements.
Shosagoto
Dance pieces (所作事) in kabuki that emphasize movement and music over plot, showcasing the performers' grace and technical skill.
Shozoku
The traditional costume robes (装束) worn in Noh theater, made of richly embroidered silk with different levels of elaborateness depending on the character's importance.
Shūmei
The ceremonial taking of a new stage name (襲名) by a kabuki actor, usually inheriting the name of a respected predecessor. This practice helps to maintain artistic lineages and traditions.
Shura mono
A category of Noh plays (修羅物, "warrior plays") featuring the ghosts of fallen warriors who recount their death in battle and seek spiritual salvation.

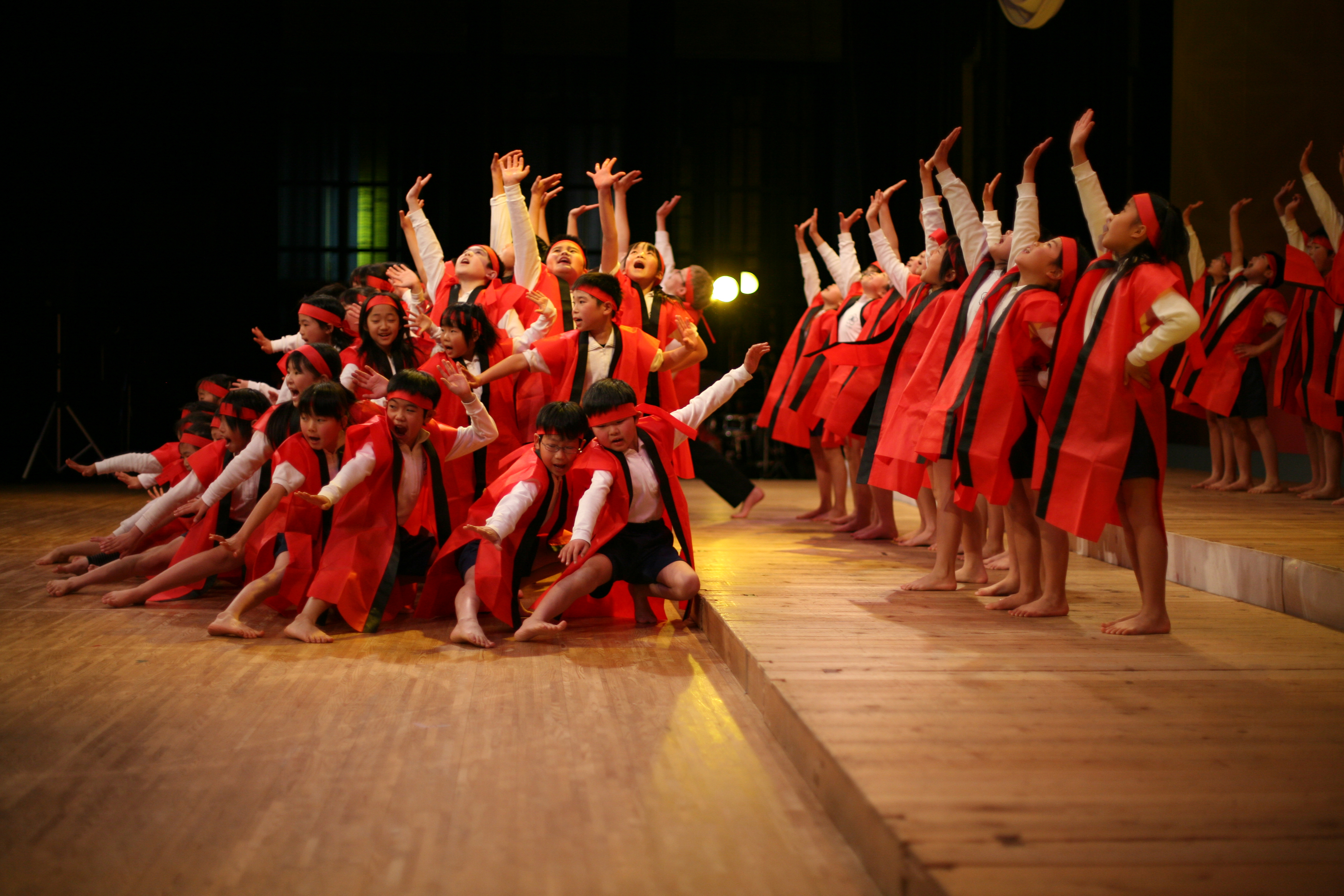
Soran Bushi performed by children

Sōran Bushi
A traditional fishermen's folk song and dance (ソーラン節) from Hokkaido. The movements imitate the work of hauling fishing nets and processing fish.
Suppon
A small trap door (スッポン) located on the hanamichi, used for supernatural characters' dramatic entrances and exits, often enhanced with smoke effects.

== T ==
Tachimawari
Stylized fighting scenes (立廻り) in kabuki, performed to music with choreographed movements, often incorporating special techniques like tombo (somersaults) and emphasized by tsuke (wooden clappers).
Tachiyaku
Male role specialists (立役) in kabuki who perform masculine characters, as distinct from onnagata who specialize in female roles.
Taishū engeki
Popular theater that emerged in the early 20th century, combining elements of kabuki with modern drama. Often performed in small theaters and characterized by melodramatic stories and spectacular stage effects.
Takarazuka Revue
An all-female musical theater troupe founded in 1913. Known for its lavish productions combining Western-style musicals with Japanese elements, featuring actresses playing both male (otokoyaku) and female (musumeyaku) roles.
Takemoto
The narrative chanting style (竹本) used in bunraku puppet theater, performed by a tayu (chanter) with shamisen accompaniment. Characterized by its dramatic vocal delivery and emotional expression.
Takigi Noh
Outdoor Noh performances (薪能, takigi nō) performed at night by bonfire light. Originally developed from Takigi Sarugaku (薪猿楽) ceremonies at Kōfukuji Temple's Saikondō in Nara, dating back to the Kamakura period. Initially a ritual for exorcising demons, it evolved into ceremonial performances by the four Yamato Sarugaku schools. While the original Kōfukuji performances were religious ceremonies offering firewood to deities, the term now generally refers to outdoor Noh performances illuminated by bonfires, commonly held at shrines, temple grounds, and historic sites during summer evenings.
Tateonnagata
The principal onnagata (female-role specialist) (立女方) in a theater.
Tayū
A narrator or chanter (太夫) in joruri and bunraku puppet theater, who provides both narrative and character voices with dramatic expression.
Tezuma
Traditional Japanese magic performance art (手妻, also called wazuma 和妻) combining sleight-of-hand with theatrical elements, rooted in street performance and temple entertainment traditions. Classic repertoire includes:
- Paper magic (連理の曲, 紙片の曲) - transforming paper through cutting and restoration
- Bowl and ball manipulations (お椀と玉)
- Water effects (五色の砂, 五色の水) - color-changing water and sand
- Rope tricks (真田紐の焼つぎ) - cutting and restoring cord
- Butterfly dance (古蝶の舞) - paper butterfly manipulation with fan
- Rice bowl productions (紙うどん) - paper to noodles transformation
Tokiwazu
A style of shamisen music (常磐津) accompanying jōruri narrative performance.
Tokoyama
Wig maker and hairdresser (床山) for kabuki actors.

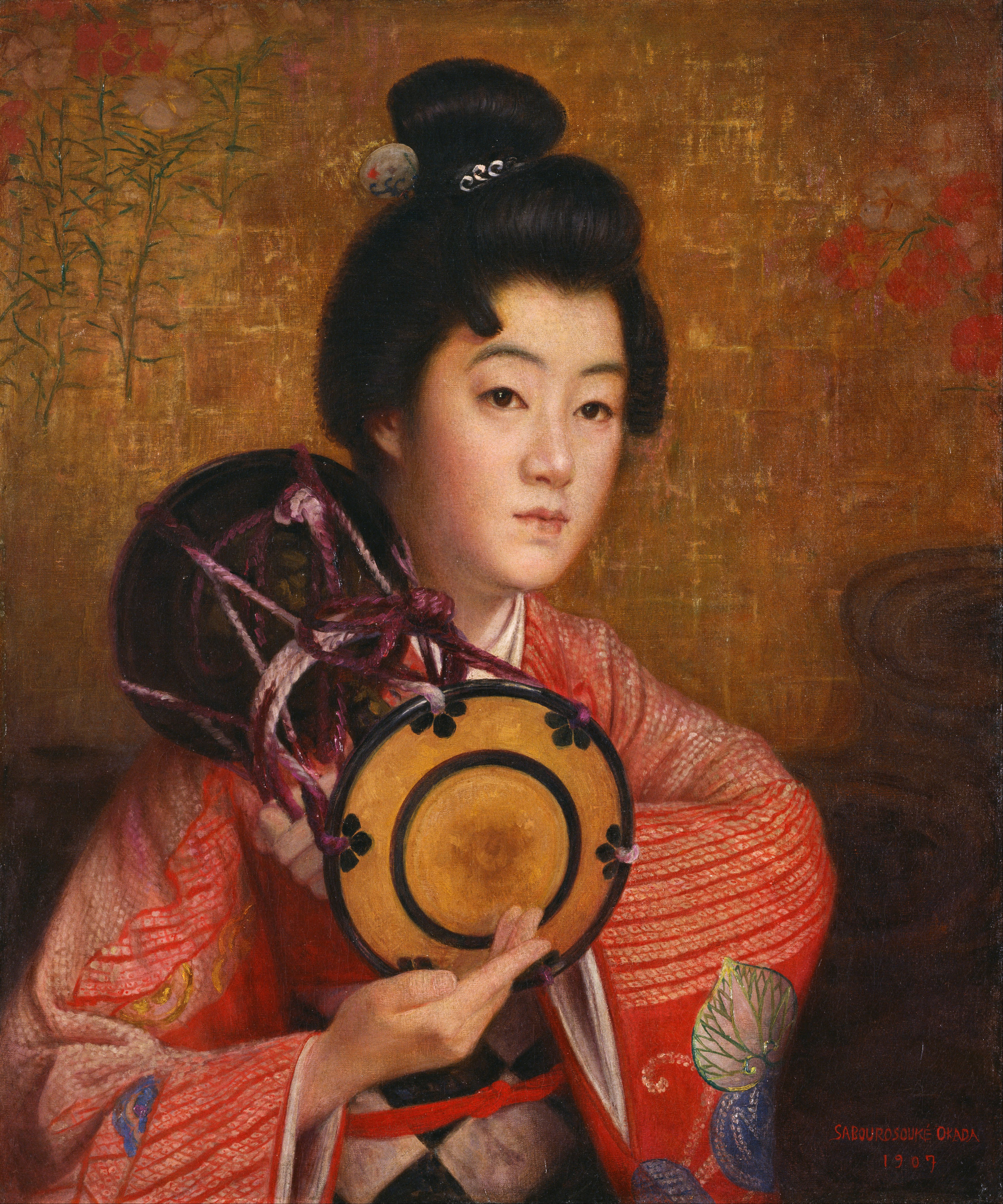
Okada Saburosuke, "Portrait of a Lady" with tsuzumi drum

Tsuzumi
Hour-glass shaped hand drums (鼓) used in Noh and kabuki music. Include the larger ōtsuzumi (大鼓) played at the hip and smaller kotsuzumi (小鼓) played at the shoulder.
Tombo
Acrobatic somersault (とんぼ) performed during kabuki fight scenes, typically executed by supporting actors when struck or thrown by the lead character in tachimawari sequences.
Toya
A preparation room (鳥屋) located at the end of the hanamichi passageway, where actors make final costume adjustments and prepare for their entrances.
Tsuke
Wooden clappers (ツケ) used for sound effects, particularly to emphasize mie poses and dramatic moments, struck against a board at stage right.
Tsukkorobashi
A kabuki character type (つっころばし) in wagoto style depicting a spineless man who falls down when pushed, requiring a soft acting style similar to onnagata roles.
Tsuzuki-Kyōgen
Multi-act plays (続き狂言) that tell one continuous story, developed during the Kanbun period (1661-1672) as opposed to single-act hanare-kyōgen.

== U ==
Uba
A type of Noh mask representing an elderly woman, characterized by its deeply wrinkled features and gentle expression.
Uchikake
An ornate overcoat (打掛) worn in kabuki by characters such as samurai wives, princesses, and courtesans. Notable for its long hem and elaborate embroidery, with specific color combinations indicating character types.
Utai
The sung portions of Noh plays, characterized by their limited tonal range and poetic text structure based on traditional Japanese seven-five rhythm. Performed by both the main actors and the chorus.
Utaigakari
Sections of nagauta music that incorporate noh-style chanting, combining kabuki music with traditional noh vocal techniques.
Utsushi-e
A form of shadow theater (写し絵) that emerged in the Edo period, using magic lanterns to project images onto screens. It was an early form of moving picture entertainment in Japan that combined storytelling with visual effects.

== W ==
Wagoto
A gentle, romantic style of acting (和事) developed in Kamigata kabuki, featuring refined movements and emotional subtlety. Often used for romantic lead roles and sophisticated urban characters.
Wagotoshi
An actor playing in Wagoto style.
Wakaonnagata
Onnagata specializing in young female roles (若女形).
Wakaotoko
A type of Noh mask depicting a young man, characterized by its smooth features and refined expression.
Wakashugata
Actors portraying young male roles (若衆方), especially handsome characters.
Wakashū Kabuki
Early form of kabuki (若衆歌舞伎) performed by young males before coming of age, popular after the 1629 ban on women performers until its own prohibition in 1652.
Waki
The secondary character (脇) in Noh plays who serves as a counterpart to the shite. It is a role of a realistic male character (and thus unmasked), usually a shrine official, a warrior, or a traveling monk, a witness to supernatural events who provides the shite "with a reason to appear and perform". Waki can have companion actors, called wakizure.
Wakibashira
The "secondary actor's pillar" (脇柱) on the Noh stage, located at downstage right. Associated with the waki's position and movements.
Wakitsure
The companion (脇連れ) to the waki in Noh plays.

== Y ==
Yagō
Professional or house names (屋号) used in Japanese traditional arts, particularly in kabuki. Often ending in "-ya" (〜屋), these names identify acting families, artistic lineages, and professional identities. They may reference a founder's birthplace or artistic specialty and are often associated with specific family crests (mon).

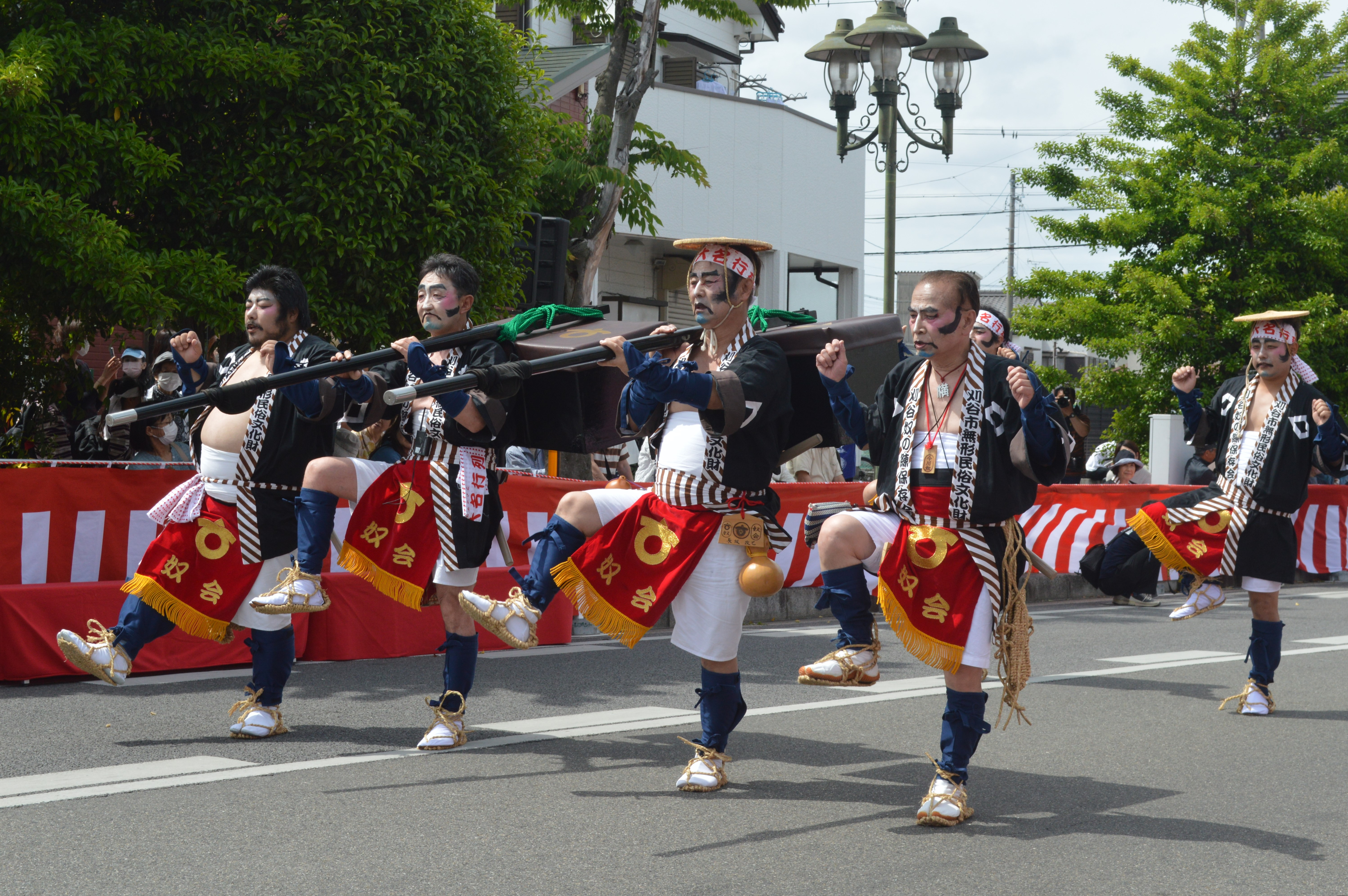
Yakkofuri

Yakkofuri
A traditional performing art (奴振り, also called yakkoburi) depicting the stylized movements of samurai attendants (yakko) carrying ceremonial items such as boxes, umbrellas, and spears. Originally performed during feudal lord processions, it influenced kabuki dance and festival traditions, with about 300 variations still performed throughout Japan (except Okinawa).
Yakugara
System of role types in kabuki (役柄) categorizing characters by social status, age, and dramatic function, including tachiyaku (heroes), katakiyaku (villains), and onnagata (female roles), each with distinctive costumes and makeup.
Yakusha
Traditional term for actors (役者) in Noh, kyōgen, and kabuki.

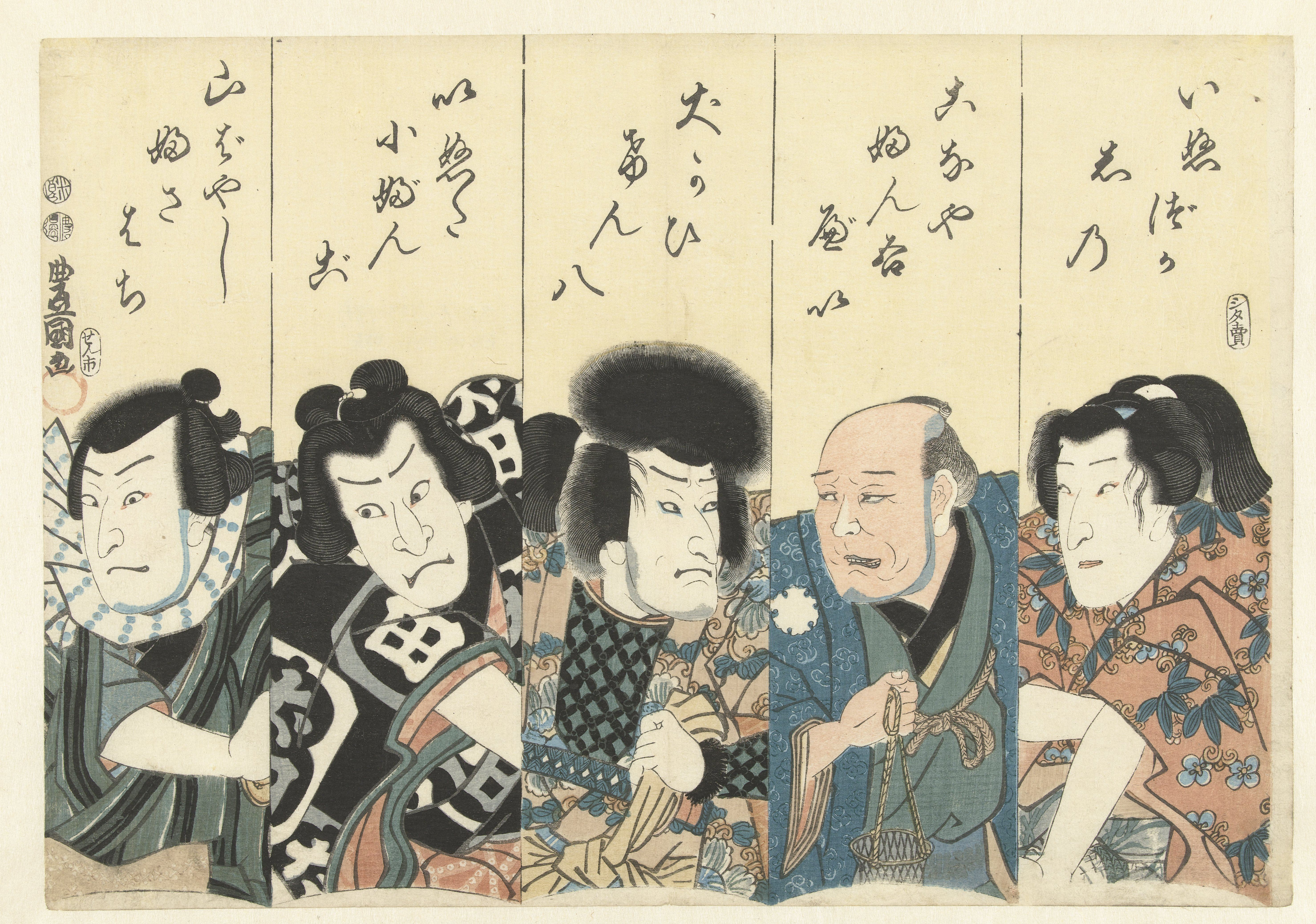
Yakusha-e by Utagawa Kunisada: five actors from the play Satomi Hakenden, pictured side by side, c. 1850s

Yakusha-e
Woodblock prints (役者絵) depicting kabuki actors, often showing them in famous roles or scenes. These prints served as both advertising and collectible artwork.
Yōkyoku
The libretti or texts of Noh plays (謡曲), characterized by their highly poetic language, sophisticated literary allusions, and careful integration with music and movement. These texts combine prose, poetry, and chant sections structured according to aesthetic principles like jo-ha-kyū.
Yarō Kabuki
Form of kabuki (野郎歌舞伎) performed by adult male actors who had shaved their forelocks, developed after the ban on wakashū kabuki and marking the transition to more complex theatrical productions.
Yatsushi
A kabuki performance style (やつし) depicting nobility fallen into poverty, requiring actors to combine elegant mannerisms with representations of hardship, typically performed in wagoto style.
Yosakoi
A modern festival dance style (よさこい) that originated in Kōchi Prefecture, combining traditional Japanese dance movements with contemporary music and choreography.
Yose
A type of traditional Japanese variety theater (寄席) that emerged during the Edo period as a venue for popular entertainment. These theaters typically feature multiple performers presenting different styles of oral storytelling and entertainment throughout the day. Unlike formal theaters, yose traditionally had audience members seated on tatami mats, creating an intimate atmosphere.
Yose performance styles
The major performance arts featured in yose theaters include:
- Rakugo (落語) - Comic storytelling performed by a single narrator (rakugoka) who remains seated on stage, using only a fan and hand towel as props.
- Kōdan (講談) - Historical narrative storytelling performed from behind a desk (kōza), often featuring military tales and historical events.
- Ninjō-banashi (人情噺) - Sentimental stories focusing on human relationships and emotional conflicts, especially the tension between duty (giri) and personal feelings (ninjō).
- Kanzen-banashi (勧善噺) - Moral stories intended to promote virtuous behavior.
- Mandan (漫談) - Comic monologues similar to modern stand-up comedy.
- Daidō-gei (大道芸) - Traditional street performances and variety acts, including:
  - Kamikiri (紙切り) - Paper cutting art
  - Harikiri (張り切り) - String figure performance
  - Tezuma (手妻) - Magic tricks
  - Kyokugei (曲芸) - Acrobatics and juggling
- Zatsugei (雑芸) - Miscellaneous entertainment acts such as:
  - Iromono (色物) - Novelty acts
  - Naniwabushi (浪花節) - Dramatic narrative singing
  - Kouta (小唄) - Short songs
  - Hauta (端唄) - Brief popular songs
- Geinyabanashi (芸屋噺) - Artistic tales focusing on the entertainment world and life in the pleasure quarters.
Yose organization
Traditional yose programs are organized into specific time slots:
- Hiru-yose (昼寄席) - Afternoon program
- Yû-yose (夕寄席) - Evening program
- Shin-yose (真寄席) - Main program
- Asa-yose (朝寄席) - Morning program
Each program typically features multiple performers and styles, arranged to provide variety and maintain audience interest throughout the performance.
Yūgen
A fundamental aesthetic principle in Noh (幽玄, "profound sublimity") representing subtle, hidden beauty that suggests rather than states. Originally used in waka poetry to mean elegance or grace representing perfect beauty, in Noh it refers specifically to the representation of transcendental beauty, including the emotional depth found in sadness and loss. Yūgen is invisible beauty that is felt rather than seen in a work of art.

== Z ==
Zagashira
Principal actor, or the leader of an acting troupe (座頭), of a kabuki company. Historically held extensive authority over both artistic and management decisions during Edo period's year-long contracts.
Zangirimono
A genre of Meiji-era kabuki plays (散切り物, "cropped-hair plays") developed by playwright Kawatake Mokuami and actor Onoe Kikugorō V. These plays featured contemporary characters with Western-style short haircuts rather than traditional samurai topknots, depicting modern office workers and government officials in contemporary settings as part of kabuki's modernization efforts.
Zamoto
A theater manager or producer (座元) in kabuki, responsible for both artistic and business aspects of production.

== 0-9 ==
2.5D musical
A contemporary form of musical theater that adapts manga, anime, and video games into stage performances. Combines traditional theatrical elements with modern multimedia effects to recreate the two-dimensional source material in a live setting.

== Bibliography ==
- Leiter, Samuel L.; Yamamoto, Jirō (1979). Kabuki encyclopedia: an English-language adaptation of Kabuki jiten. Westport, Conn: Greenwood Press. ISBN 978-0313206542.
- Leiter, Samuel L. (30 July 1997). New Kabuki Encyclopedia: A Revised Adaptation of UKabuki Jiten. Bloomsbury Academic. ISBN 978-0-313-29288-0.
- Leiter, Samuel L. (30 October 2014). Historical Dictionary of Japanese Traditional Theatre. Rowman & Littlefield. ISBN 978-1-4422-3911-1.
- Pinnington, Noel John (21 February 2019). A New History of Medieval Japanese Theatre: Noh and Kyōgen from 1300 to 1600. Springer. ISBN 978-3-030-06140-1.
- Odanaka, Akihiro; Iwai, Masami (16 July 2020). Japanese Political Theatre in the 18th Century: Bunraku Puppet Plays in Social Context. Routledge. ISBN 978-0-429-62000-3.

== See also ==
- Glossary of owarai terms (Japanese comedy)
- Glossary of ukiyo-e
- Glossary of Shinto (traditional Japanese religion)
- Glossary of Japanese Buddhism
