= Kanze =

Kanze may refer to:

- Garzê Tibetan Autonomous Prefecture
- The Kanze school of Noh theatre (観世)
- Kanze Nobumitsu, a Noh playwright
- Hideo Kanze, a 20th-century Noh actor
