= Noh masks of the Konparu school =

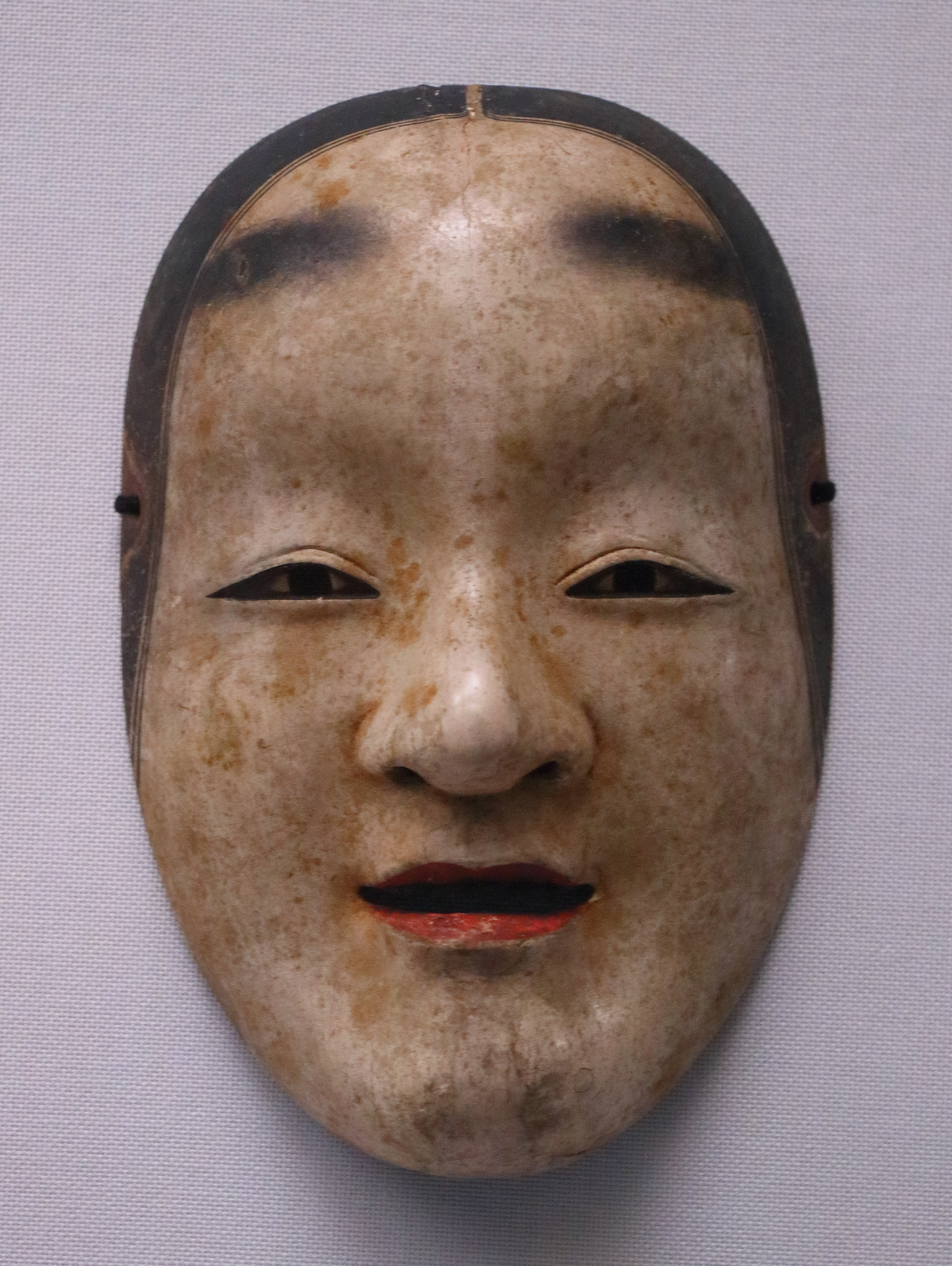
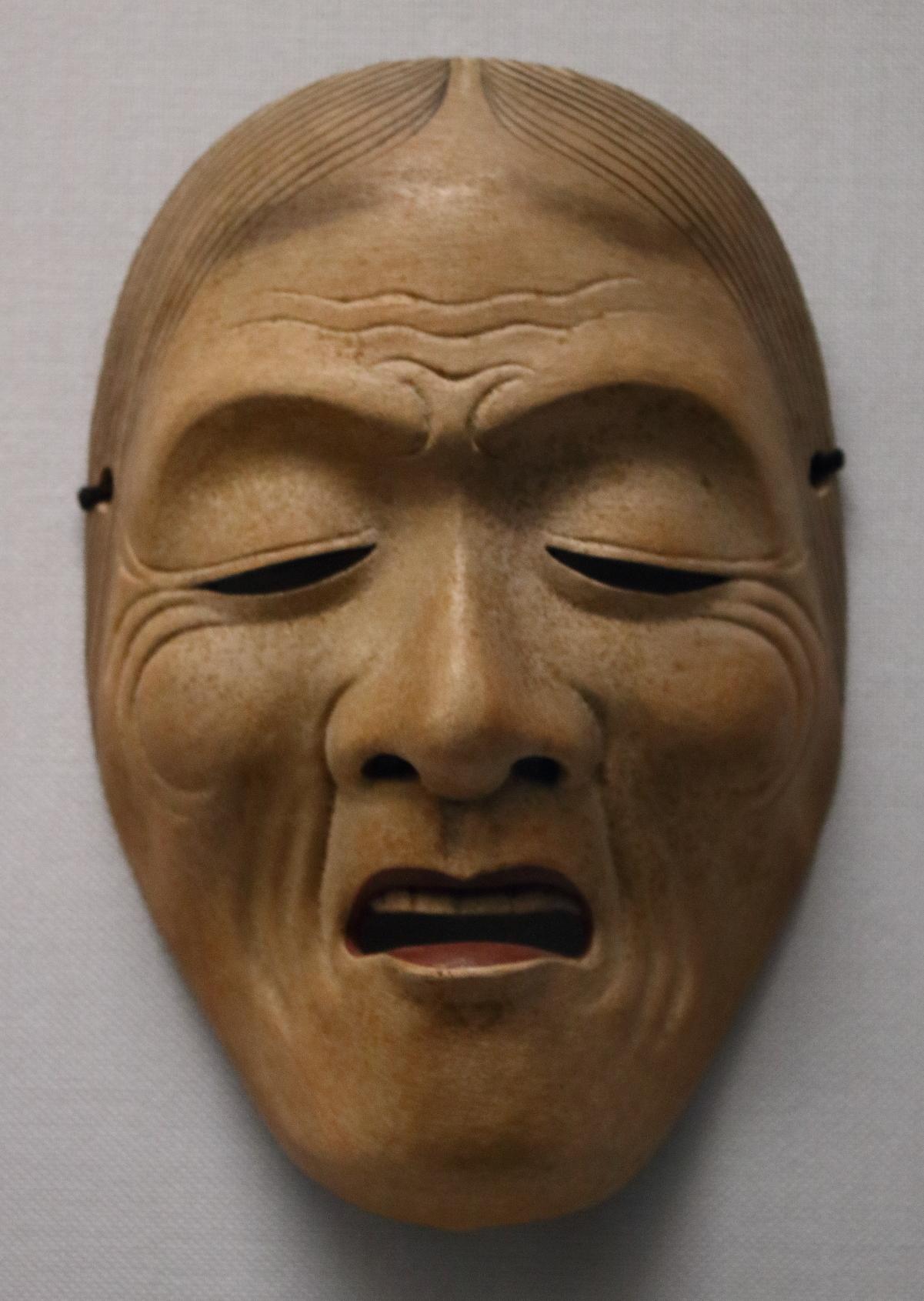
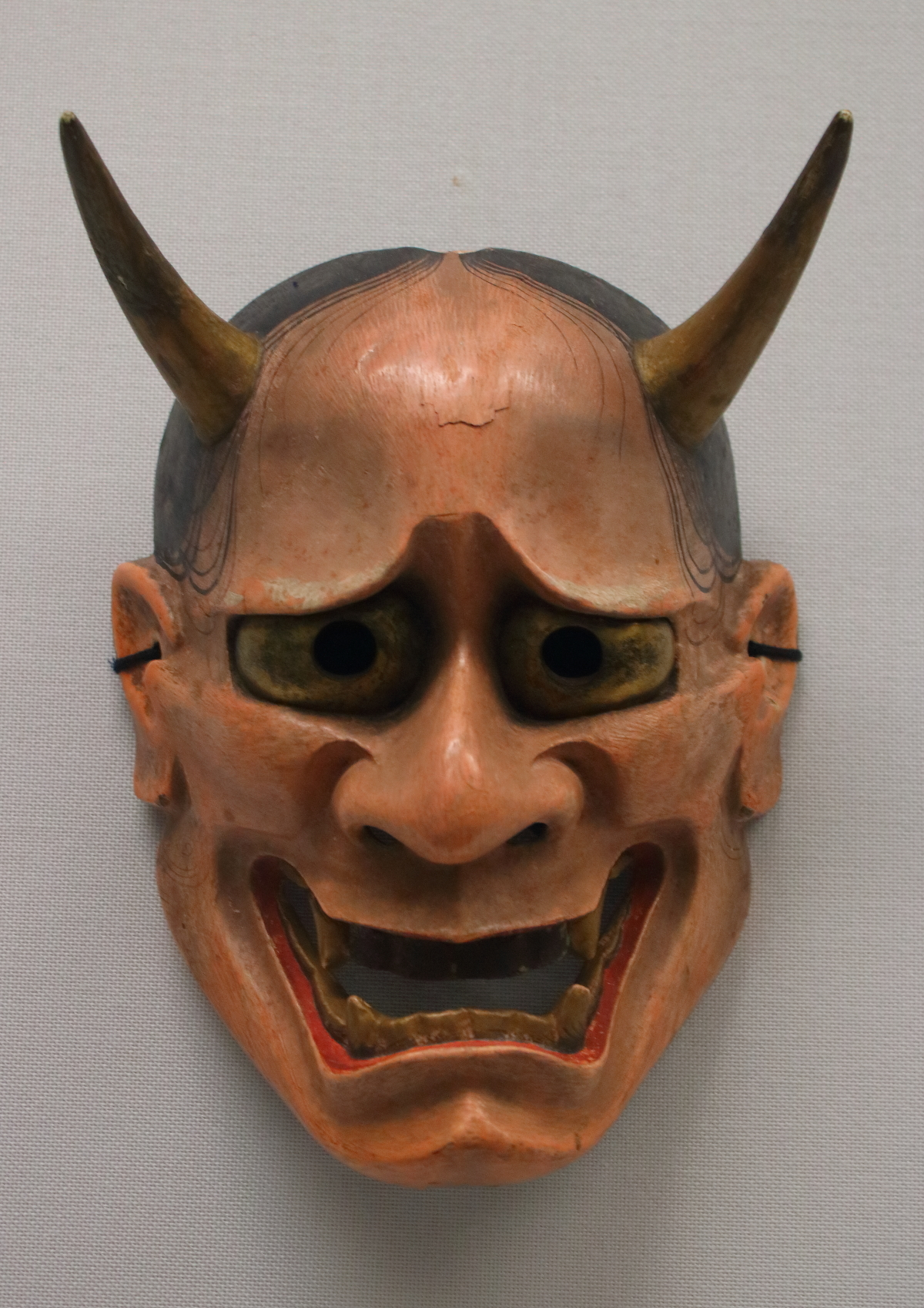
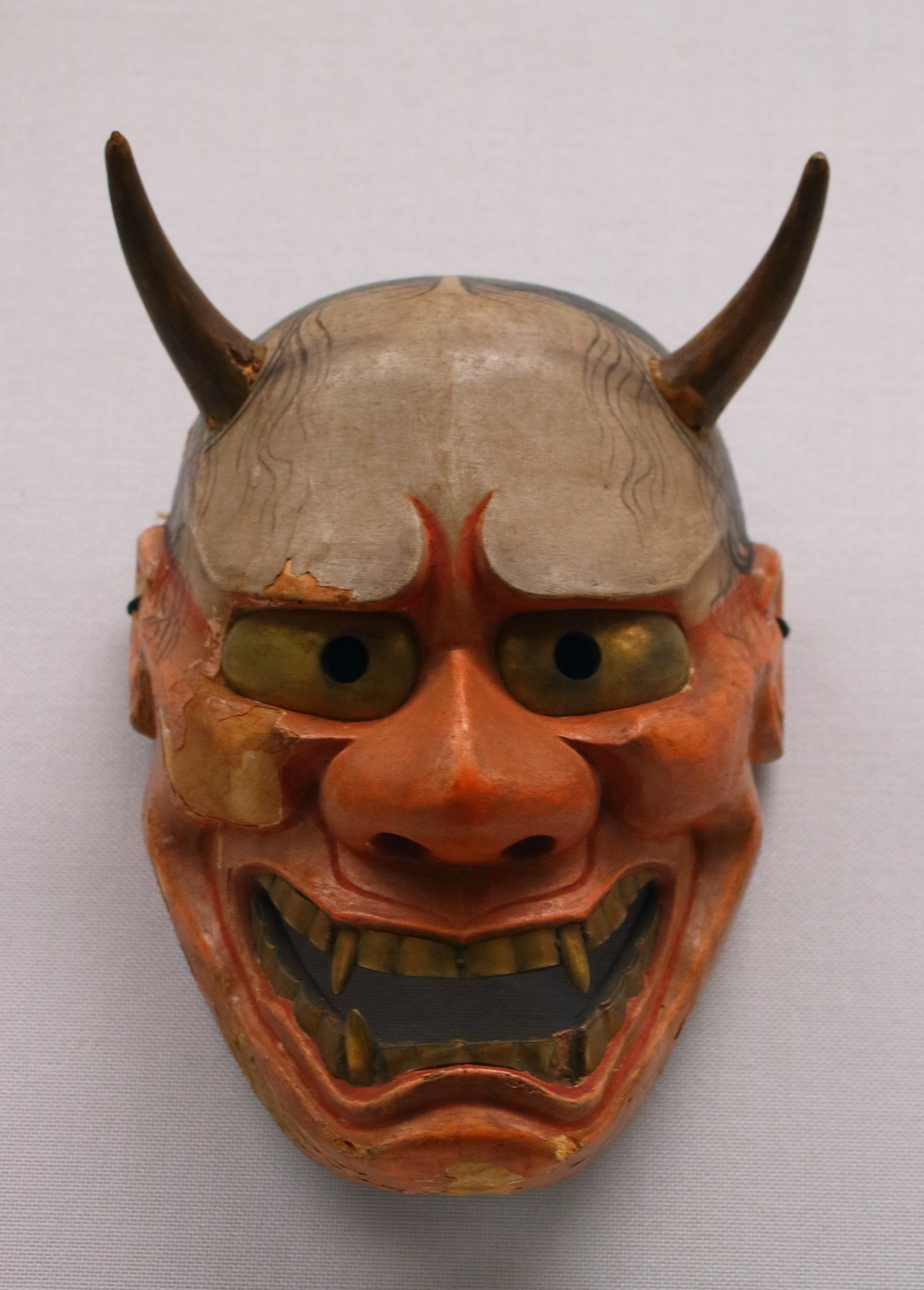
- Year: 15-19th century
- Catalogue: C-1528 to C-1574 (TNM catalogue)
- Type: Noh masks, wood (colored)
- Designation: Important Cultural Property
- Location: Tokyo National Museum, Tokyo, Japan

The Noh masks of the Konparu school are a set of 47 noh masks formerly owned by the famous Konparu family of noh actors and playwrights, now part of the collection of the Tokyo National Museum. These masks span five centuries, from the Muromachi to the Edo period (15th to 19th century), and are designated Important Cultural Properties.

The Konparu school was originally led by Konparu Zenchiku (1405 – ca. 1470) and his grandson Konparu Zenpō (1454 – ca. 1532). The troupe prospered during the Azuchi–Momoyama period (1573–1603), with a critical factor for their success being the patronage of the daimyō Toyotomi Hideyoshi (1537–1598), at a time when the leader of the Konparu school was Konparu Ansho (1549–1621), a retained actor of Toyotomi.

During the late Edo period (1603–1868) the troupe faced difficulties and started to lose vitality, and during the Bakumatsu and the period of the Meiji Restoration in the late 19th century, many of the noh masks and other properties of the Konparu family were sold throughout Japan. In around 1868 this set of masks together with some other noh costumes and stage props were transferred to the Kasuga-taisha shrine in Nara. It was a group of ten volunteers in Nara, known collectively as Teirakusha, who dedicated themselves to preserve and protect them, purchasing many of the items and allowing the actors to continue using them.

In 1950 after World War II the 47 masks and 196 costumes in the possession of the Teirakusha became part of the collection of the Tokyo National Museum in Tokyo, where they are now kept and exhibited occasionally.
