= Kasuga ryūjin =

Kasuga Ryūjin

春日龍神
- English title: Dragon God of Kasuga
- Written by: possibly Komparu Zenchiku
- Category: 5th — final
- Characters: maeshite an old shrine priest nochijite Dragon God waki the monk Myōe wakizure two monk companions ai a minor Kasuga deity
- Place: Kasuga Shrine, Nara
- Time: c. first lunar month, 1203
- Sources: (Myōe no) Yume no ki, Kasuga Gongen genki
- Schools: all

Kasuga Ryūjin (春日龍神), or "The Kasuga Dragon God," is a Japanese Noh play often attributed to Komparu Zenchiku, son-in-law of Zeami Motokiyo. The play features the historical figure Myōe Shōnin (1173 – 1232), abbot of the Buddhist temple Kōzan-ji, and famous for his detailed dream diary. Myōe sought for many years to visit China and India, and to witness the places where the historical Buddha preached; in episodes recorded in his dream diary and other sources, Myōe is said to have been visited, both in dreams and via oracles, by the Dragon God of Kasuga Shrine, who persuaded him to remain in Japan. The play is inspired by and based upon these sources, and relates one such meeting of Myōe with the Dragon God.

== Plot ==
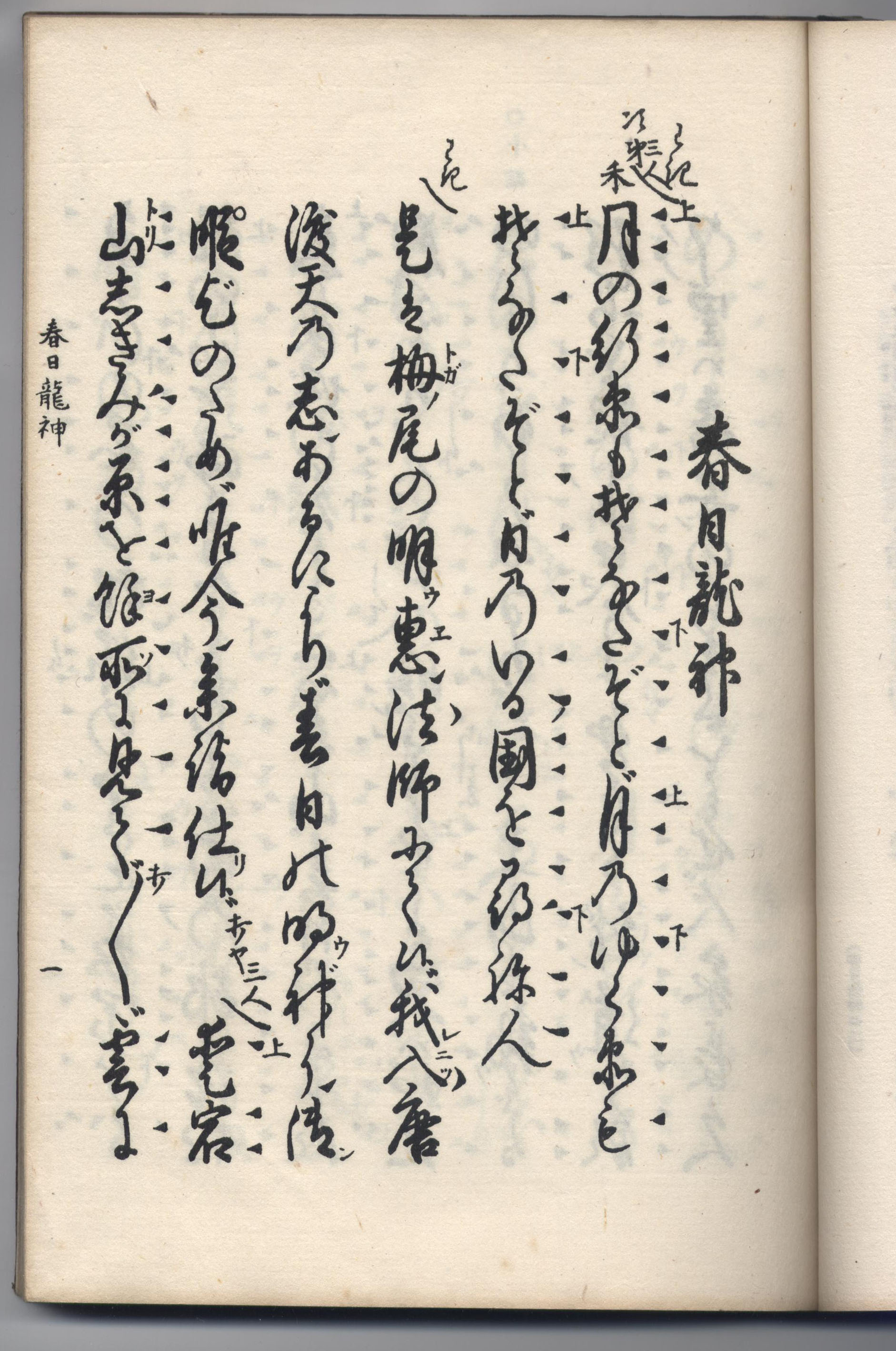
Opening page of the play songbook for Kasuga Ryūjin

The play opens with Myōe and his companions traveling to Kasuga Shrine to say formal farewells to the kami of the shrine, before they leave for their journey to China and India. There, they meet a priest, an old man, who welcomes them into the shrine grounds, saying that Myōe is favored by the kami of the shrine like a first-born son, and that of course he should be most welcome. Learning of Myōe's intentions to journey abroad, however, he argues that the kami shouldn't like to see him go, as his presence at the shrine is so treasured.

The priest goes on to explain that, were the Buddha still living, one would do well to hear him preach in person. But, he says, the ages have turned, and the sacred places of India and China are now represented in Japan. He equates important Buddhist sites such as Vulture Peak to sites in Japan, such as Mount Mikasa, and encourages Myōe to visit these sacred sites instead. He offers that if Myōe will desist with his plan, he will reveal to the monk, upon Mount Mikasa, the five regions of India, the Buddha's birth, the Buddha's enlightenment, his preaching, and his passing.

Convinced, Myōe gives up his intentions to travel to the continent, and asks the old man his name. The priest identifies himself as Tokifū Hideyuki, a name drawn from those of the founders of the Kasuga Shrine, Nakatomi no Tokifū and Nakatomi no Hideyuki, at which he vanishes.

Between the two acts of the play, a kyōgen actor portraying a minor kami in the service of the shrine comes forth and retells the story of the first act.

In the second act, the Dragon God of Kasuga (the kasuga ryūjin of the play's title) appears, and dances, while speaking to Myōe, and confirming that he has in fact given up his intentions to journey to the continent.
