= National Noh Theatre =

Theater in Shibuya, Tokyo, Japan

- 国立能楽堂
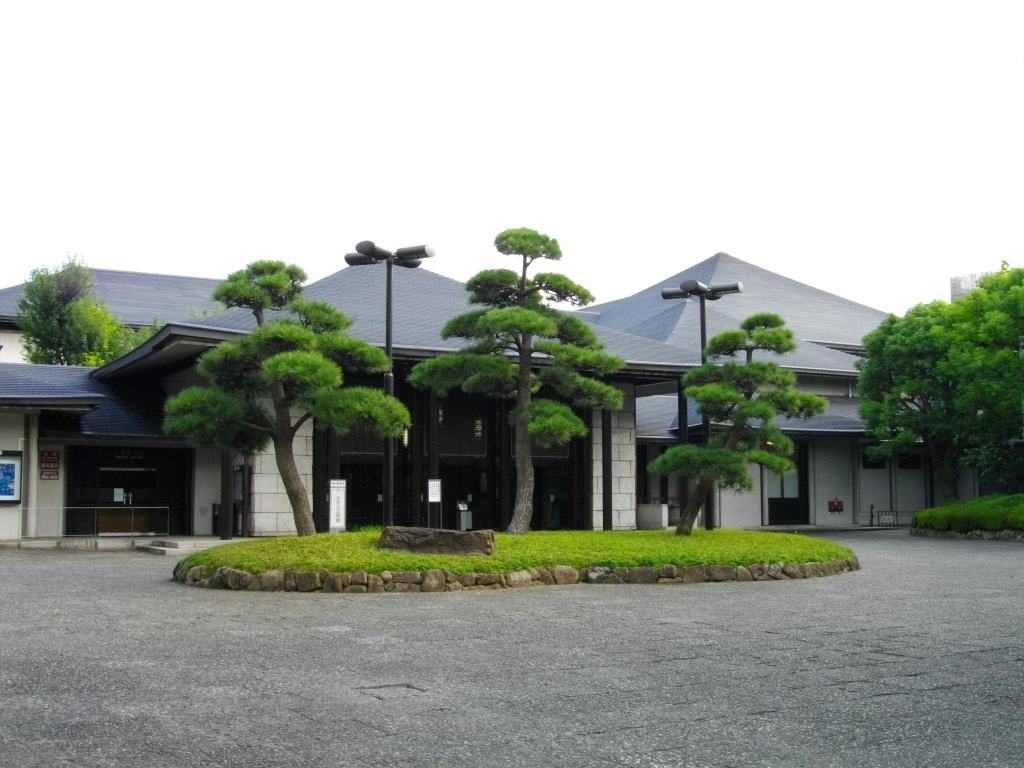
- National Noh Theatre
- Interactive map of National Noh Theatre
- Address: 4-18-1 Sendagaya, Shibuya-ku; Tokyo; Japan
- Coordinates: 35°40′49″N 139°42′29.3″E
- Capacity: 591

Construction
- Opened: 1983
- Architect: Hiroshi Ōe

Website
- http://www.ntj.jac.go.jp/nou.html

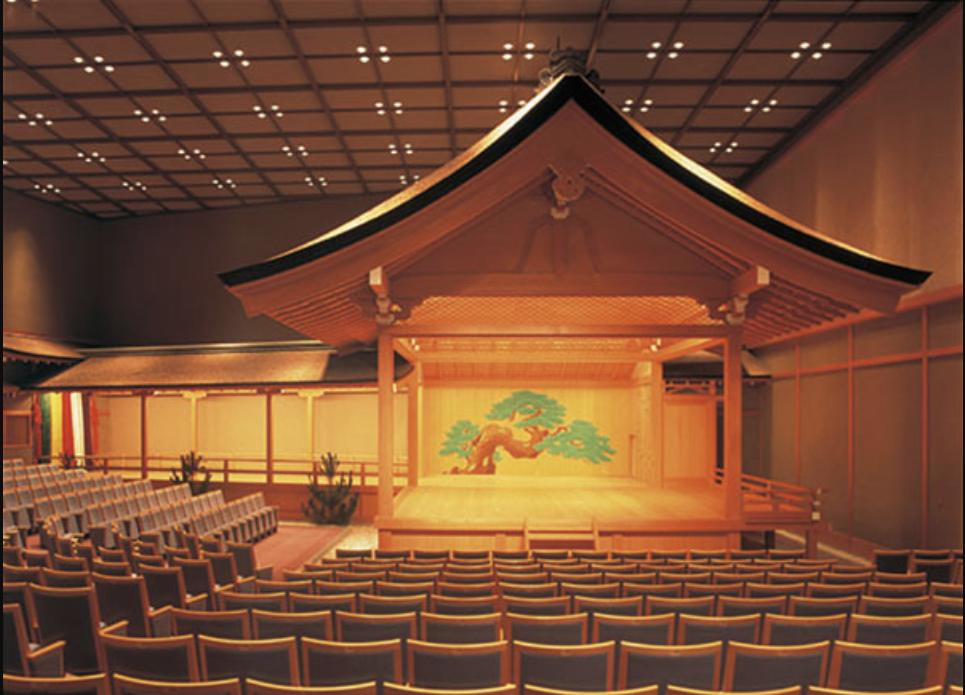
Auditorium; the stage is of hinoki, the backdrop decorated with a pine; the principal actors enter and exit along the passageway to the side, while the chorus and musicians enter from a low door in the righthand corner to the rear

The National Noh Theatre (国立能楽堂, Kokuritsu Nōgaku Dō) opened in Sendagaya, Shibuya, Tokyo, Japan, in September 1983. The auditorium seats 591 for performances of Noh and Kyōgen, and there is also a rehearsal stage, exhibition area, lecture room, and reference library. In 2007, the National Noh Theatre began to annually present regular programs by female performers. The National Noh Theatre also comprises an exhibition room where special exhibitions of costumes, masks, and props used in nohgaku performances are exhibited.

== See also ==
- Noh
