= Kanze (Noh school) =

Japanese classic musical drama

Kanze (観世) is a school of Noh (能), a Japanese classic musical drama.

It was founded in the 14th century. It is led by the 26th grand master Kiyokazu Kanze, who became head at the age of 31.

The theatre stage moved to the redeveloped Matsuzakaya building at Ginza.
