= Konparu Zenchiku =

Japanese Noh actor, troupe leader, and playwright

Konparu Zenchiku (金春 禅竹; b. Shichirō Ujinobu (七郎 氏信) 1405–1468, 1470 or 1471) was a skilled Japanese Noh actor, troupe leader, and playwright. His plays are particularly characterized by an intricate, allusive, and subtle style inherited from Zeami Motokiyo which convolved yūgen with influences from Zen Buddhism (his Zen master was Ikkyū) and Kegon. Actors should strive for unconscious performance, in which they enters the "circle of emptiness"; such a state of being is the highest level of artistic or religious achievement.

He lived, worked, and died in the Nara area of Japan. He was trained by Zeami and his son, Motomasa (died 1432), eventually marrying a daughter of Zeami. At some point he took the artistic name Komparu Ujinobu and then finally Konparu Zenchiku. In 1443, he became the leader of the Kanze acting troupe and thus the second successor to Zeami Motokiyo. Zeami passed on his secret teachings to Zenchiku, apparently prompting Zeami's exiling; this refusal to transmit to his blood descendants also prompted a split between the Komparu school and the Kanze. Zenchiku's grandson was Konparu Zenpō, and his descendants would continue to head the Komparu school of Noh.

== Works ==
=== Attributed writings ===
- Rokurin ichiro no ki ("A Record of Six Rings and the One Sword"; 六輪一露之記)
- Go'on Sangyoku Shū ("Collected Comments on the Five [Feeling] Tones and the Three Performing Modes [Used to Create Them]"; 五音三曲集)

=== Noh plays ===
- Bashō ("The Plantain Tree"; 芭蕉)
- Eguchi (江口; sometimes credited to Kan'ami and revised by Zeami, or Ikkyu)
- Kakitsubata ("The Iris"; 杜若; possibly by Zeami)
- Kasuga ryūjin ("The Kasuga Dragon God"; uncertain authorship but attributed to Zenchiku)
- Kogō ("Lady Kogō"; 小督)
- Matsumushi ("The Pine Cricket"; 松虫)
- Mekari (和布刈)
- Oshio (小塩)
- Saoyama (佐保山; Zenchiku?)
- Seiōbo ("Queen Mother of the West"; 西王母)
- Senju (千手 or 千寿)
- Shironushi (代主)
- Shōkun (very uncertain authorship; variously attributed to Zenchiku, Zeami, or neither)
- Shōki (鍾馗)
- Shunkan or Kikaigashima (俊寛 or 鬼界島)
- Tamakazura ("The Jeweled Chaplet"; 玉葛 or 玉鬘)
- Tatsuta (龍田 or 竜田)
- Teika (定家; about the rumored love affair between Fujiwara no Teika and Shikishi Naishinnō)
- Ugetsu ("Rain and Moon"; 雨月)
- Yang Kuei-fei, Yokihi, or Yōkihi (楊貴妃)
