= Noh =

Classical Japanese dance-drama theater

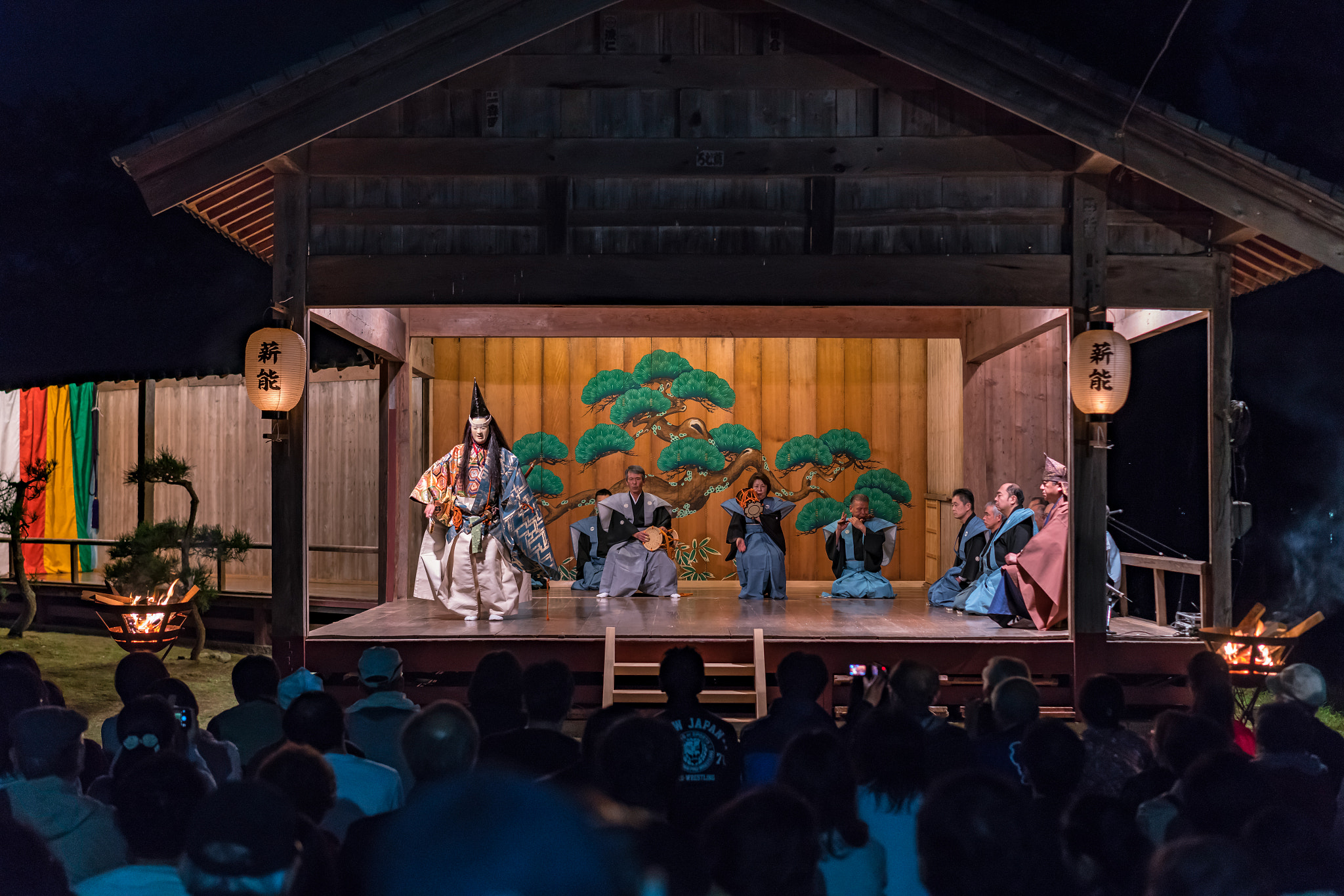
- Noh performance on Sado Island, Japan
- Medium: Dance-drama
- Originating culture: Japan

Nôgaku theatre
- UNESCO Intangible Cultural Heritage
- Country: Japan
- Reference: 00012
- Region: Asia and the Pacific

Inscription history
- Inscription: 2008 (3rd session)
- List: Representative

Noh (能, Nō; Japanese pronunciation: [nó̞ò̞, nò̞ó̞, nó̞ó̞], (Note: [nò̞ó̞, nó̞ó̞] are only optionally used for the performing art. For the more general "ability" sense, only [nó̞ò̞] is found.) Sino-Japanese for "ability" (Note: Short for geinō (芸能; [ɡei.noː, ɡeː-], transl. artistic ability; performing arts).)) is a major form of classical Japanese dance-drama that has been performed since the 14th century. It is Japan's oldest major theater art that is still regularly performed today. Noh is often based on tales from traditional literature featuring a supernatural being transformed into a human hero who narrates the story. Noh integrates masks, costumes and various props in a dance-based performance, requiring highly trained actors and musicians. Emotions are primarily conveyed by stylized conventional gestures while the iconic masks represent specific roles such as ghosts, women, deities, and demons. Having a strong emphasis on tradition rather than innovation, Noh is highly codified and regulated by the iemoto system.

Although the terms Noh and nōgaku are sometimes used interchangeably, nōgaku encompasses both Noh and kyōgen. Traditionally, a full nōgaku program included several Noh plays with comedic kyōgen plays in between; an abbreviated program of two Noh plays with one kyōgen piece has become common today.

== History ==
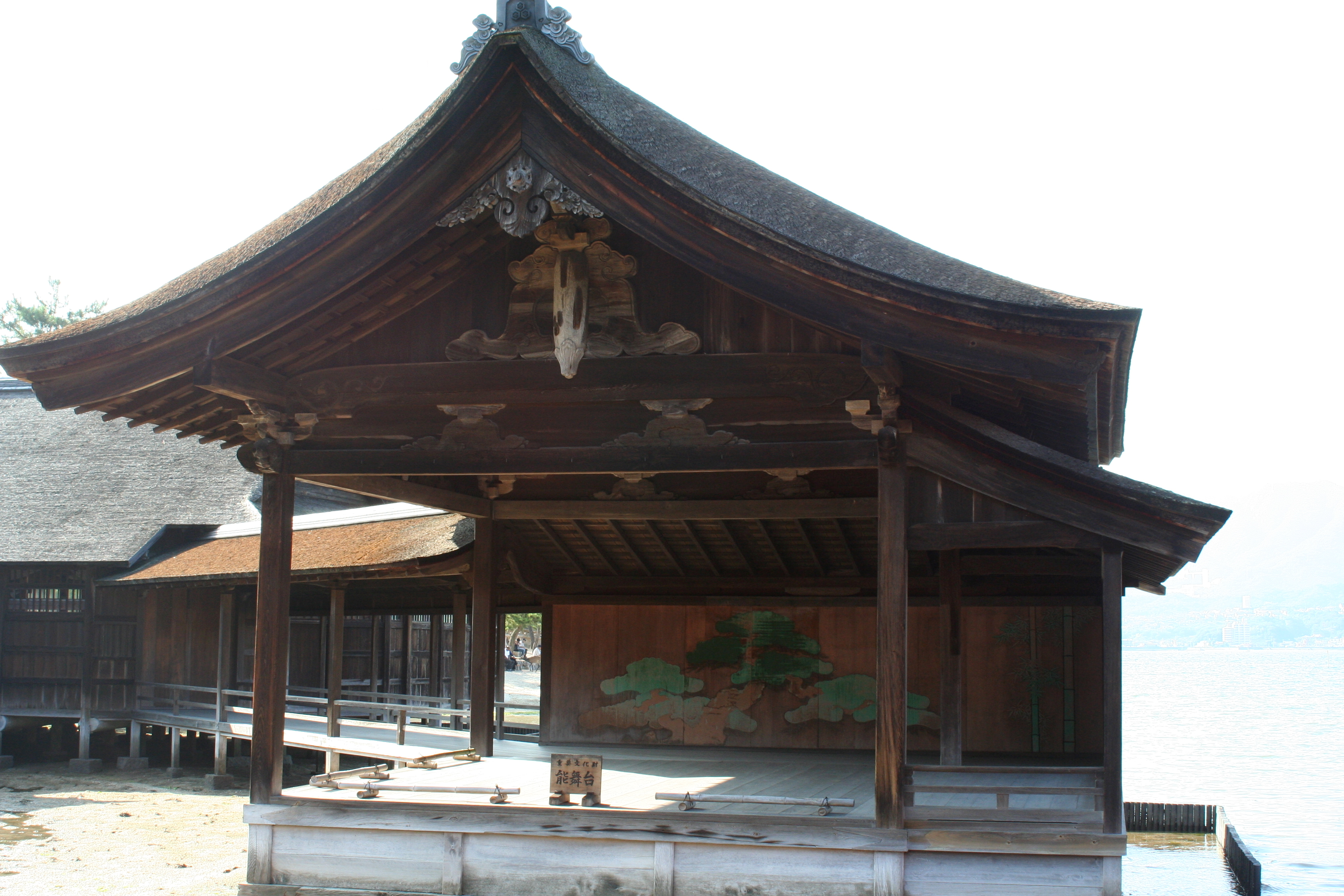
World's oldest Noh stage at Miyajima

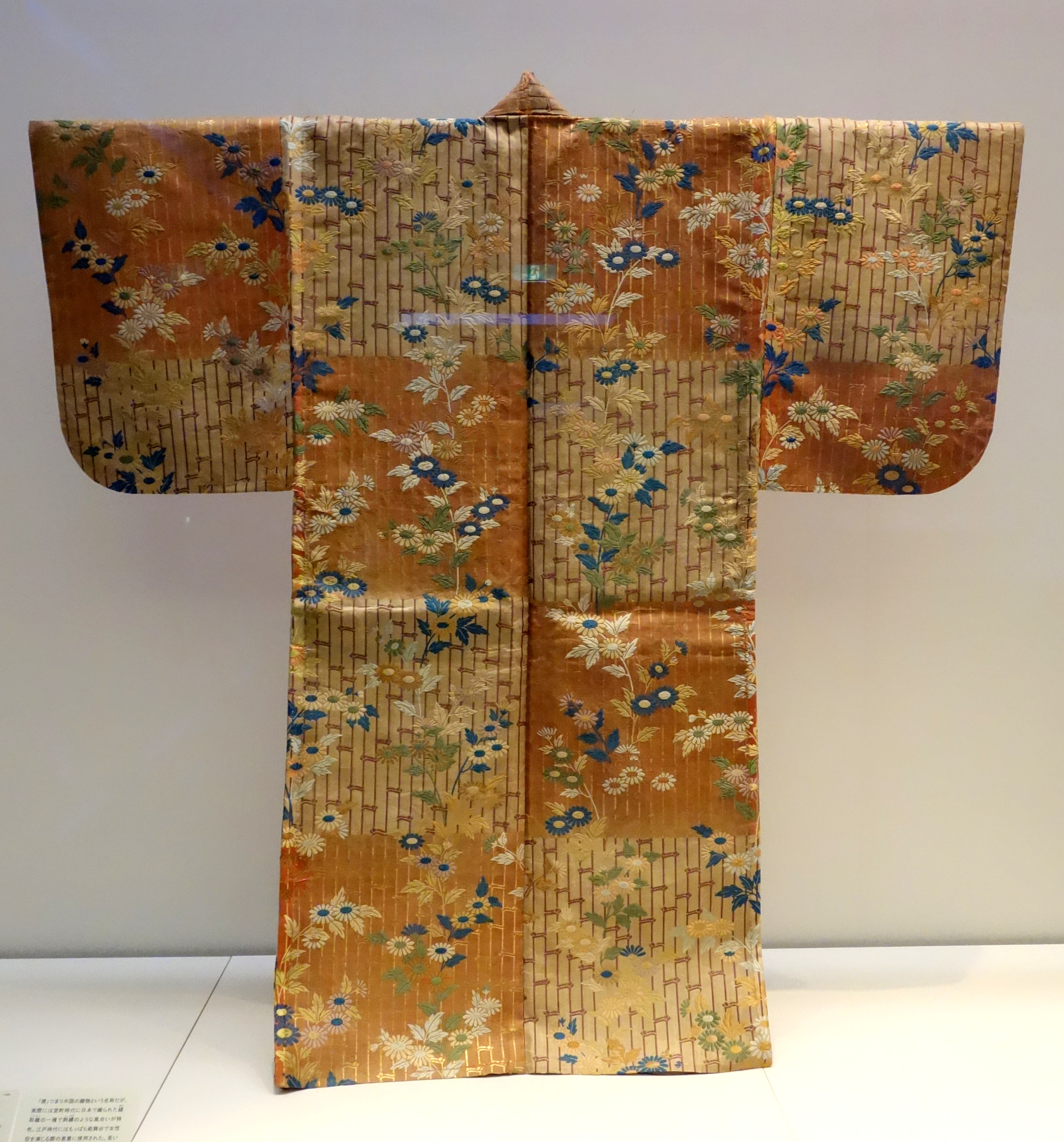
Karaori garment, Edo period, 18th century, bamboo and chrysanthemum design on red and white checkered ground

=== Origins ===
The kanji for Noh (能) means "skill", "craft", or "talent", particularly in the field of performing arts in this context. The word Noh may be used alone or with gaku (楽; entertainment, music) to form the word nōgaku. Noh is a classical tradition that is highly valued by many today. When used alone, Noh refers to the historical genre of theatre that originated from sarugaku in the mid 14th century and continues to be performed today.

One of the oldest forerunners of Noh and kyōgen is sangaku, which was introduced to Japan from China in the 8th century. At the time, the term sangaku referred to various types of performance featuring acrobats, song and dance as well as comic sketches. Its subsequent adaptation to Japanese society led to its assimilation of other traditional art forms. Various performing art elements in sangaku as well as elements of dengaku (rural celebrations performed in connection with rice planting), sarugaku (popular entertainment including acrobatics, juggling, and pantomime), shirabyōshi (traditional dances performed by female dancers in the Imperial Court in the 12th century), gagaku (music and dance performed in the Imperial Court beginning in the 7th century), and kagura (ancient Shinto dances in folk tales) evolved into Noh and kyōgen.

Studies on the genealogy of the Noh actors in 14th century indicate they were members of families specializing in the performing arts. According to legend, the Konparu School, which is considered to be the oldest tradition of Noh, was founded by Hata no Kawakatsu in the 6th century. However, the founder of the Konparu school, which is widely accepted among historians, was Bishaō Gon no Kami (Komparu Gonnokami) during Nanboku-chō period in the 14th century. According to the genealogical chart of the Konparu school, Bishaō Gon no Kami is a descendant after 53 generations of Hata no Kawakatsu. The Konparu school was descended from the sarugaku troupe which had played active roles in Kasuga-taisha and Kofuku-ji in Yamato Province.

Another theory, by Shinhachirō Matsumoto, suggests Noh originated from outcastes struggling to claim higher social status by catering to those in power, namely the new ruling samurai class of the time. The transfer of the shogunate from Kamakura to Kyoto at the beginning of Muromachi period marked the increasing power of the samurai class and strengthened the relationship between the shogunate and the court. As Noh became the shōgun's favorite art form, Noh was able to become a courtly art form through this newly formed relationship. In 14th century, with strong support and patronage from shōgun Ashikaga Yoshimitsu, Zeami was able to establish Noh as the most prominent theatre art form of the time.

=== The establishment of Noh by Kan'ami and Zeami Motokiyo ===
In the 14th century, during the Muromachi period (1336 to 1573), Kan'ami Kiyotsugu and his son Zeami Motokiyo reinterpreted various traditional performing arts and completed Noh in a significantly different form from the traditional one, essentially bringing Noh to the present form. Kan'ami was a renowned actor with great versatility playing roles from graceful women and 12-year-old boys to strong men. When Kan'ami first presented his work to the 17-year-old Ashikaga Yoshimitsu, Zeami was a child actor in his play, around age 12. Yoshimitsu fell in love with Zeami and his position of favor at court caused Noh to be performed frequently for Yoshimitsu thereafter.

Konparu Zenchiku, who was the great-grandson of Bishaō Gon no Kami, the founder of the Konparu school, and the husband of Zeami's daughter, incorporated elements of waka (poetry) into Zeami's Noh and further developed it.

By this period, among the five major schools of Noh, four were established: the Kanze school, established by Kan'ami and Zeami; the Hōshō school established by Kan'ami's eldest brother; the Konparu school; and the Kongō school. All of these schools were descendants of the sarugaku troupe from Yamato Province. The Ashikaga Shogunate supported only the Kanze school among the four schools.

=== Tokugawa era ===
During the Edo period, Noh continued to be an aristocratic art form supported by the shōgun, the feudal lords (daimyōs), as well as wealthy and sophisticated commoners. While kabuki and joruri popular to the middle class focused on new and experimental entertainment, Noh strived to preserve its established high standards and historic authenticity and remained mostly unchanged throughout the era. To capture the essence of performances given by great masters, every detail in movements and positions was reproduced by others, generally resulting in an increasingly slow, ceremonial tempo over time.

In this era, the Tokugawa shogunate appointed Kanze school as the head of the four schools. Kita Shichidayū (Shichidayū Chōnō), a Noh actor of the Konparu school who served Tokugawa Hidetada, founded the Kita school, which was the last established of the five major schools.

=== Modern Noh after Meiji era ===
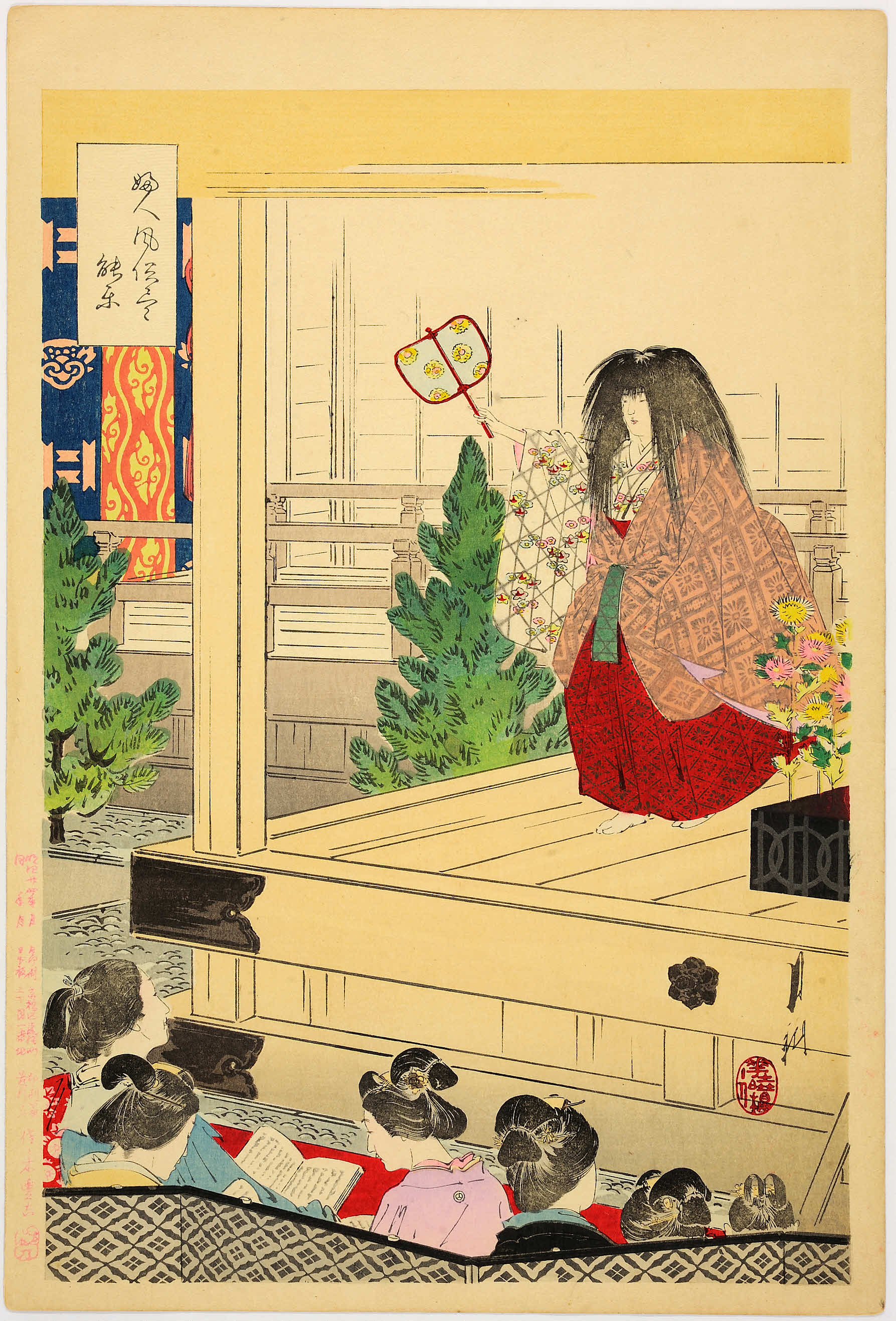
In the Noh Theatre, 1891 by Ogata Gekkō

The fall of the Tokugawa shogunate in 1868 and the formation of a new, modernized government resulted in the end of financial support by the state, and the entire field of Noh experienced major financial crisis. Shortly after the Meiji Restoration both the number of Noh performers and Noh stages greatly diminished. The support from the imperial government was eventually regained partly due to Noh's appeal to foreign diplomats. The companies that remained active throughout the Meiji era also significantly broadened Noh's reach by catering to the general public, performing at theatres in major cities such as Tokyo and Osaka.

In 1957 the Japanese Government designated nōgaku as an Important Intangible Cultural Property, which affords a degree of legal protection to the tradition as well as its most accomplished practitioners. The National Noh Theatre founded by the government in 1983 stages regular performances and organizes courses to train actors in the leading roles of nōgaku. Noh was inscribed in 2008 on the Representative List of the Intangible Cultural Heritage of Humanity by UNESCO as Nōgaku theatre.

Although the terms nōgaku and Noh are sometimes used interchangeably, the Japanese government's definition of "nōgaku" theatre encompasses both Noh plays and kyōgen plays. Kyōgen is performed in between Noh plays in the same space. Compared to Noh, "kyōgen relies less on the use of masks and is derived from the humorous plays of the sangaku, as reflected in its comic dialogue."

=== Women in Noh ===
During the Edo period, the guild system gradually tightened, which largely excluded women from Noh, except for some women (such as courtesans) performing songs in marginal situations. Later, in the Meiji era, Noh performers taught wealthy people and nobles, and this led to more opportunities for female performers because women insisted on female teachers. In the early 1900s, after women were allowed to join Tokyo Music School, the rules forbidding women from joining various schools and associations in Noh were relaxed. In 1948, the first women joined the Nohgaku Performers' Association. In 2004, the first women joined the Association for Japanese Noh Plays. In 2007, the National Noh Theatre began to annually present regular programs by female performers. In 2009, there were about 1200 male and 200 female professional Noh performers.

== Jo-ha-kyū ==
The concept of jo-ha-kyū dictates virtually every element of Noh including compiling of a program of plays, structuring of each play, songs and dances within plays, and the basic rhythms within each Noh performance. Jo means beginning, ha means breaking, and kyū means rapid or urgent. The term originated in gagaku, ancient courtly music, to indicate gradually increasing tempo and was adopted in various Japanese traditions including Noh, tea ceremony, poetry, and flower arrangement.

Jo-ha-kyū is incorporated in the traditional five-play program of Noh. The first play is jo, the second, third, and fourth plays are ha, and the fifth play is kyū. In fact, the five categories discussed below were created so that the program would represent jo-ha-kyū when one play from each category is selected and performed in order. Each play can be broken into three parts, the introduction, the development, and the conclusion. A play starts out in a slow tempo at jo, gets slightly faster at ha, then culminates in kyū.

== Roles and training ==
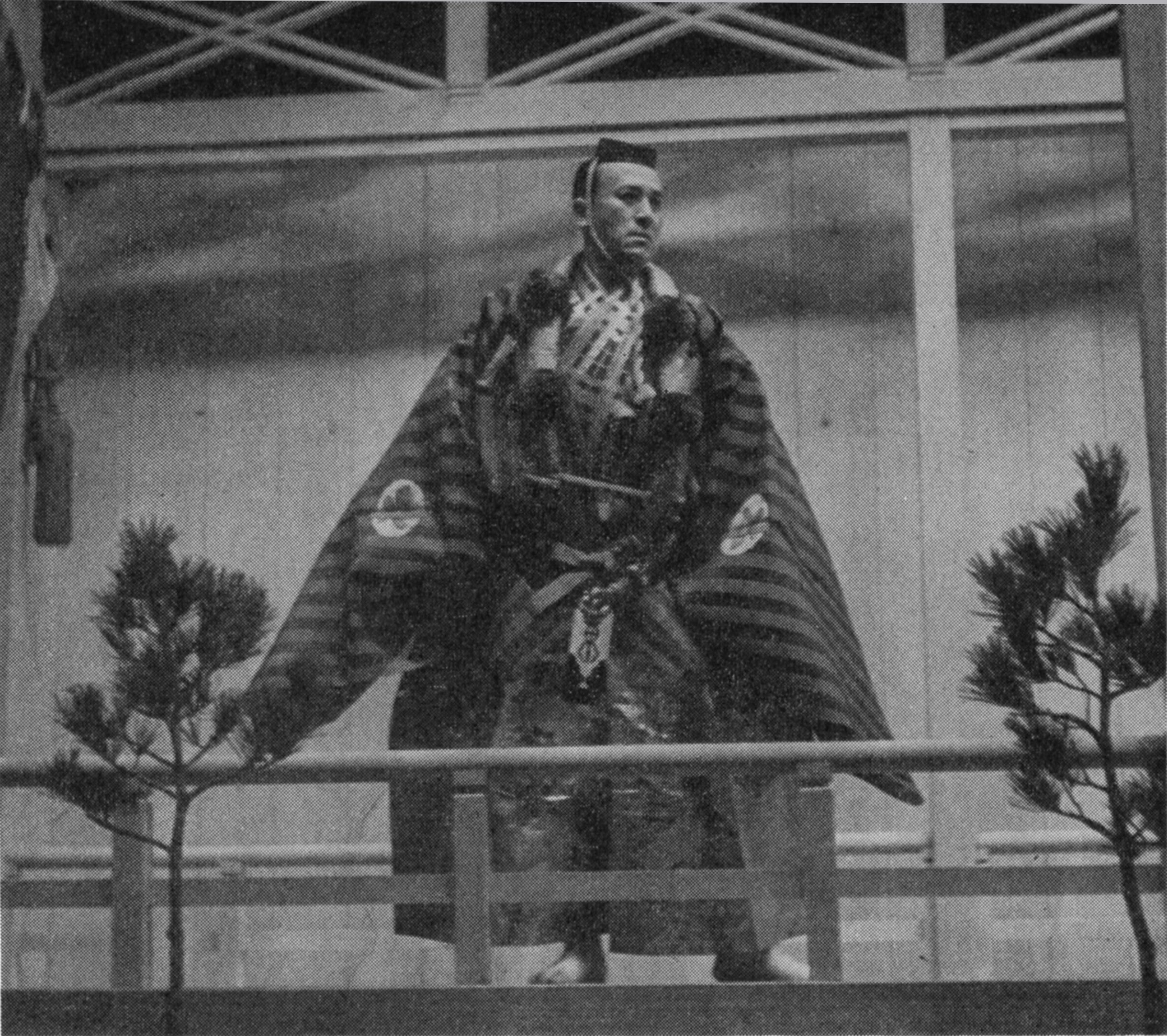
Kanze Sakon (1895–1939), head (sōke) of Kanze school

=== Roles ===
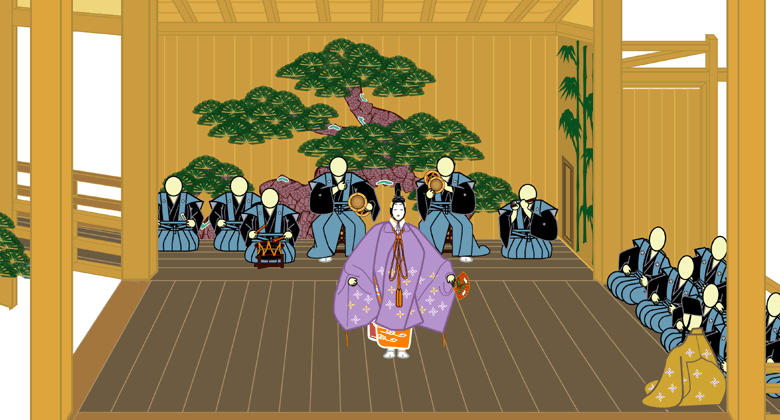
Noh stage. Center: shite; front right: waki; right: eight-member jiutai (chorus); rear center: four hayashi-kata (musicians); rear left: two kōken (stage hands)

There are four major categories of Noh performers: shite, waki, kyōgen, and hayashi.

1. Shite (仕手, シテ; pronounced roughly like "shee-teh" in English). Shite is the main protagonist, or the leading role in plays. In plays where the shite appears first as a human and then as a ghost, the first role is known as the mae-shite and the latter as the nochi-shite.
  - Shitetsure (仕手連れ, シテヅレ). The shite's companion. Sometimes shitetsure is abbreviated to tsure (連れ, ツレ), although this term refers to both the shitetsure and the wakitsure.
  - Kōken (後見) are stage hands, usually one to three people.
  - Jiutai (地謡) is the chorus, usually comprising six to eight people.
2. Waki (脇, ワキ) performs the role that is the counterpart or foil of the shite.
  - Wakitsure (脇連れ, ワキヅレ) or Waki-tsure is the companion of the waki.
3. Kyōgen (狂言) perform the aikyōgen (間狂言), which are interludes during plays. Kyōgen actors also perform in separate plays between individual Noh plays.
4. Hayashi (囃子) or hayashi-kata (囃子方) are the instrumentalists who play the four instruments used in Noh theatre: the transverse flute (笛, fue), hip drum (大鼓, ōtsuzumi) or ōkawa (大皮), the shoulder-drum (小鼓, kotsuzumi), and the stick-drum (太鼓, taiko). The flute used for Noh is specifically called nōkan or nohkan (能管).

A typical Noh play always involves the chorus, the orchestra, and at least one shite and one waki actor.

=== Training ===
Actors begin their training as young children, traditionally at the age of three.

Zeami identified nine levels or types of Noh acting. Lower levels emphasize movement. Higher levels are metaphorically compared with the opening of a flower and involve spiritual prowess.

There are five extant schools training shite actors: Kanze (観世), Hōshō (宝生), Komparu (金春), Kongō (金剛), and Kita (喜多). Each school has its own iemoto family that carries the name of the school and is considered the most important. The iemoto holds the power to create new plays or modify lyrics and performance modes.

Waki actors are trained in the schools Takayasu (高安), Fukuou (福王), and Hōshō (宝生).

Two schools train kyōgen actors: Ōkura (大蔵) and Izumi (和泉).

Eleven schools train instrumentalists, each school specializing in one to three instruments. Each instrument has its own schools. The Flute (Fue kata) has 3 schools: Issō, Morita, Fujita. The shoulder drum (Ko-tsuzumi Kata) has 4 schools: Kō, Kōsei, Ōkura, Kanze. The hip drum (Ō-tsuzumi Kata) has 5 schools: Kadono, Takayasu, Ishii, Ōkura, Kanze. The stick drum (Taiko Kata) has two schools: Kanze and Komparu.

The Waki, Hayashi and Kyōgen are collectively known as San-yaku (three roles). During the Edo period, each Shite school had these three roles attached to the troupe as an exclusive contract. After the Meiji Restoration, some schools were abolished and today there is no such system of the Sankaku being attached to a specific Shite school, meaning the Sankaku roles may perform in any performance of any school.

The Nohgaku Performers' Association (Nōgaku Kyōkai), with which all professionals are registered, strictly protects the traditions passed down from performers' ancestors (see iemoto). However, several secret documents of the Kanze school written by Zeami, as well as materials by Konparu Zenchiku, have been diffused throughout the community of scholars of Japanese theatre.

== Performance elements ==
Noh performance combines a variety of elements into a stylistic whole, with each particular element the product of generations of refinement according to the central Buddhist, Shinto, and minimalist aspects of Noh's aesthetic principles.

=== Masks ===
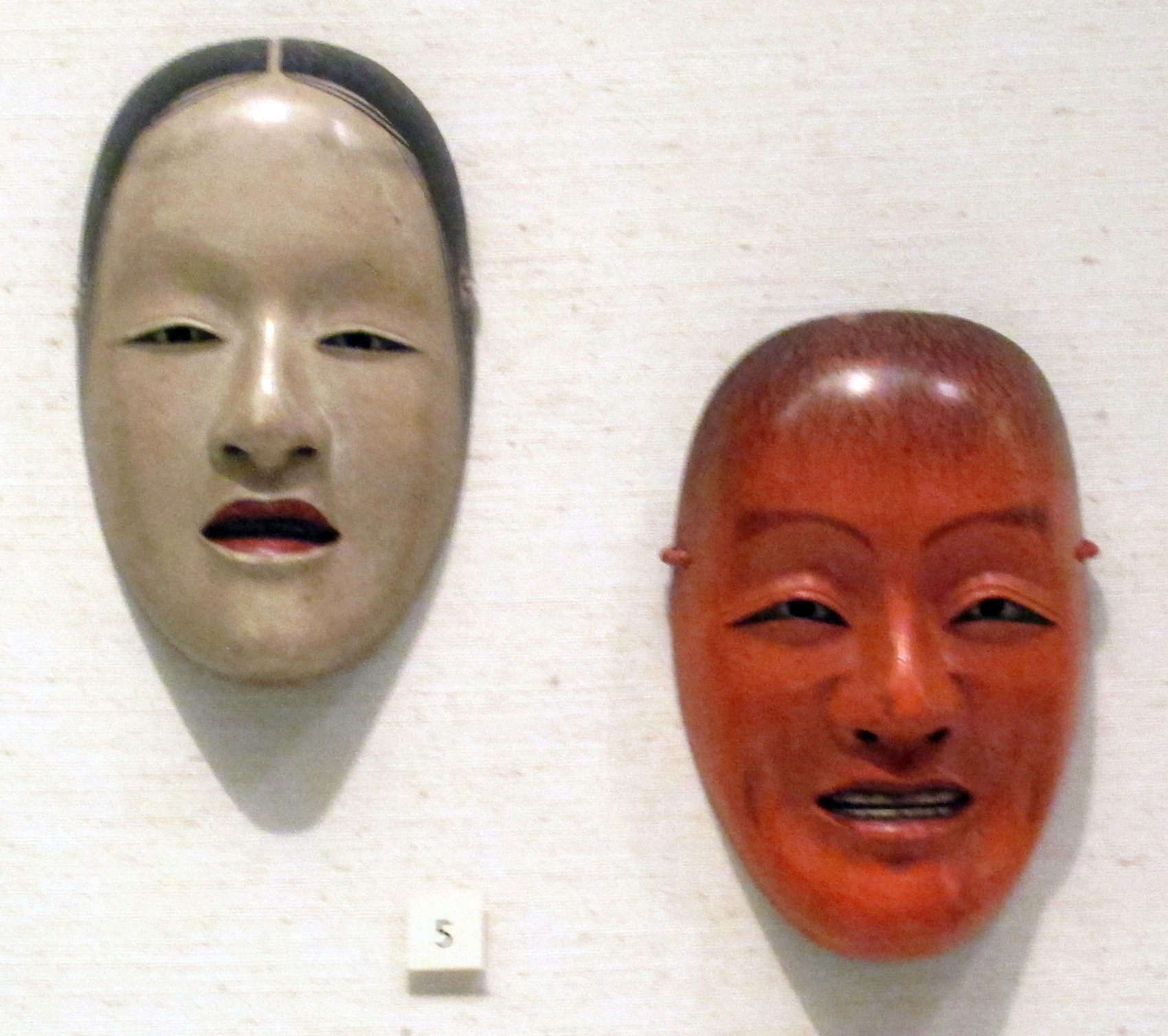
Nō masks. Right: Drunken spirit (shōjō). Made of red and black lacquered wood, with red silk tying cord, by Himi Munetada (氷見宗忠). Edo period, 19th century. Left: Nakizo, representing a female deity or woman of high rank, associated with Nō plays such as Hagoromo and Ohara Miyuki. Made of lacquered and painted wood by Norinari (憲成), designed by Zoami (増阿弥). 18th–19th century.

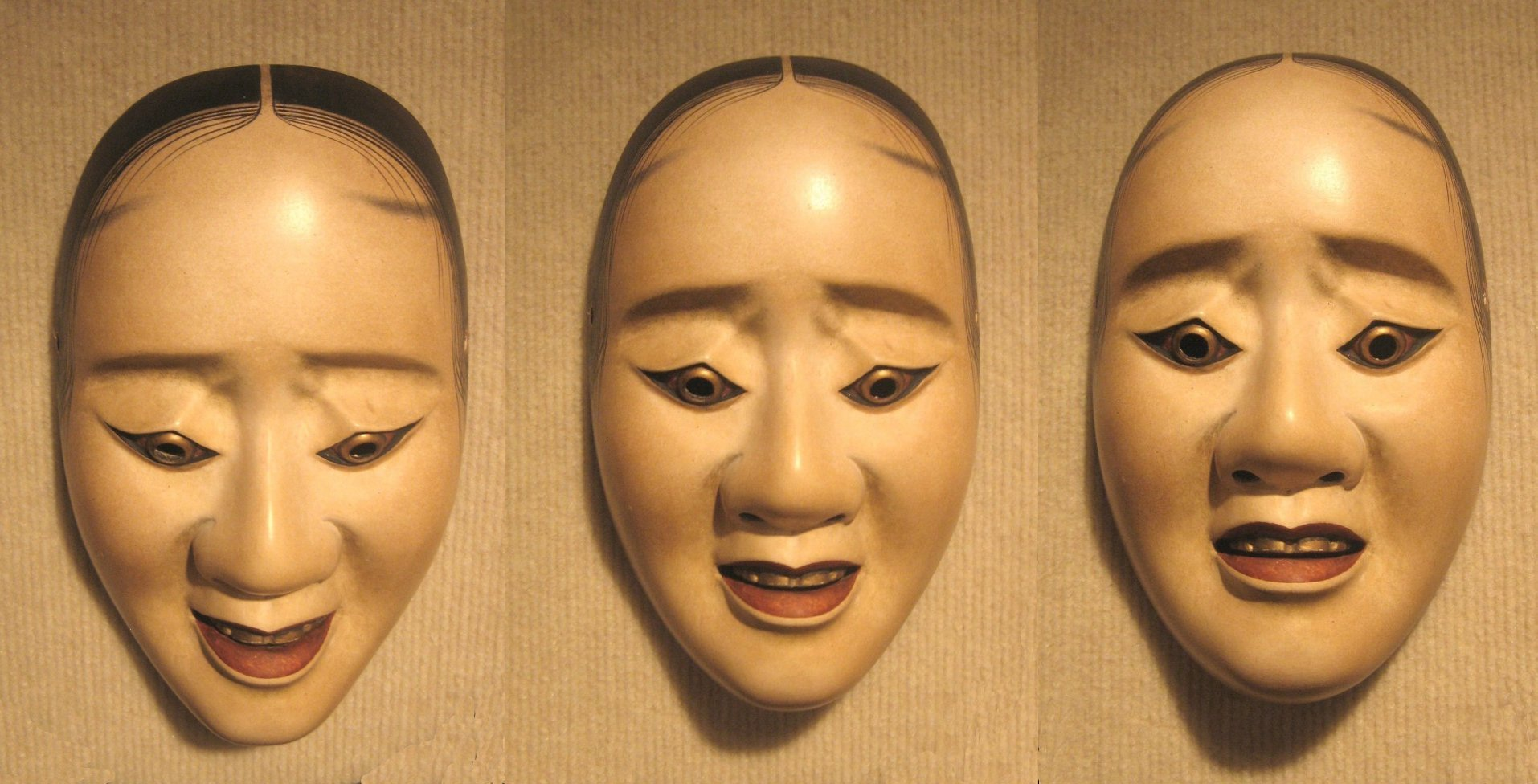
Three pictures of the same female mask showing how the expression changes with a tilting of the head. This mask expresses different moods. In these pictures, the mask was affixed to a wall with constant lighting, and only the camera moved.

Noh masks (能面 nō-men or 面 omote) are carved from blocks of Japanese cypress (檜 "hinoki"), and painted with natural pigments on a neutral base of glue and crushed seashell. There are approximately 450 different masks mostly based on sixty types, all of which have distinctive names. Some masks are representative and frequently used in many different plays, while some are very specific and may only be used in one or two plays. Noh masks signify the characters' gender, age, and social ranking, and by wearing masks the actors may portray youngsters, old men, female, or nonhuman (divine or demonic) characters. Only the shite, the main actor, wears a mask in most plays, although the tsure may also wear a mask in some plays.

Even though the mask covers an actor's facial expressions, the use of the mask in Noh is not an abandonment of facial expressions altogether. Rather, its intent is to stylize and codify the facial expressions through the use of the mask and to stimulate the imagination of the audience. By using masks, actors are able to convey emotions in a more controlled manner through movements and body language. Some masks use lighting effect to convey different emotions through slight tilting of the head. Facing slightly upward, or "brightening" the mask, will let the mask to capture more light, revealing more features that appear laughing or smiling. Facing downward, or "clouding" it, will cause the mask to appear sad or mad.

Noh masks are treasured by Noh families and institutions, and the powerful Noh schools hold the oldest and most valuable Noh masks in their private collections, rarely seen by the public. The most ancient mask is supposedly kept as a hidden treasure by the oldest school, the Konparu. According to the current head of the Konparu school, the mask was carved by the legendary regent Prince Shōtoku (572–622) over a thousand years ago. While the historical accuracy of the legend of Prince Shōtoku's mask may be contested, the legend itself is ancient as it is first recorded in Zeami's Style and the Flower written in the 14th century. Some of the masks of the Konparu school belong to the Tokyo National Museum, and are exhibited there frequently.

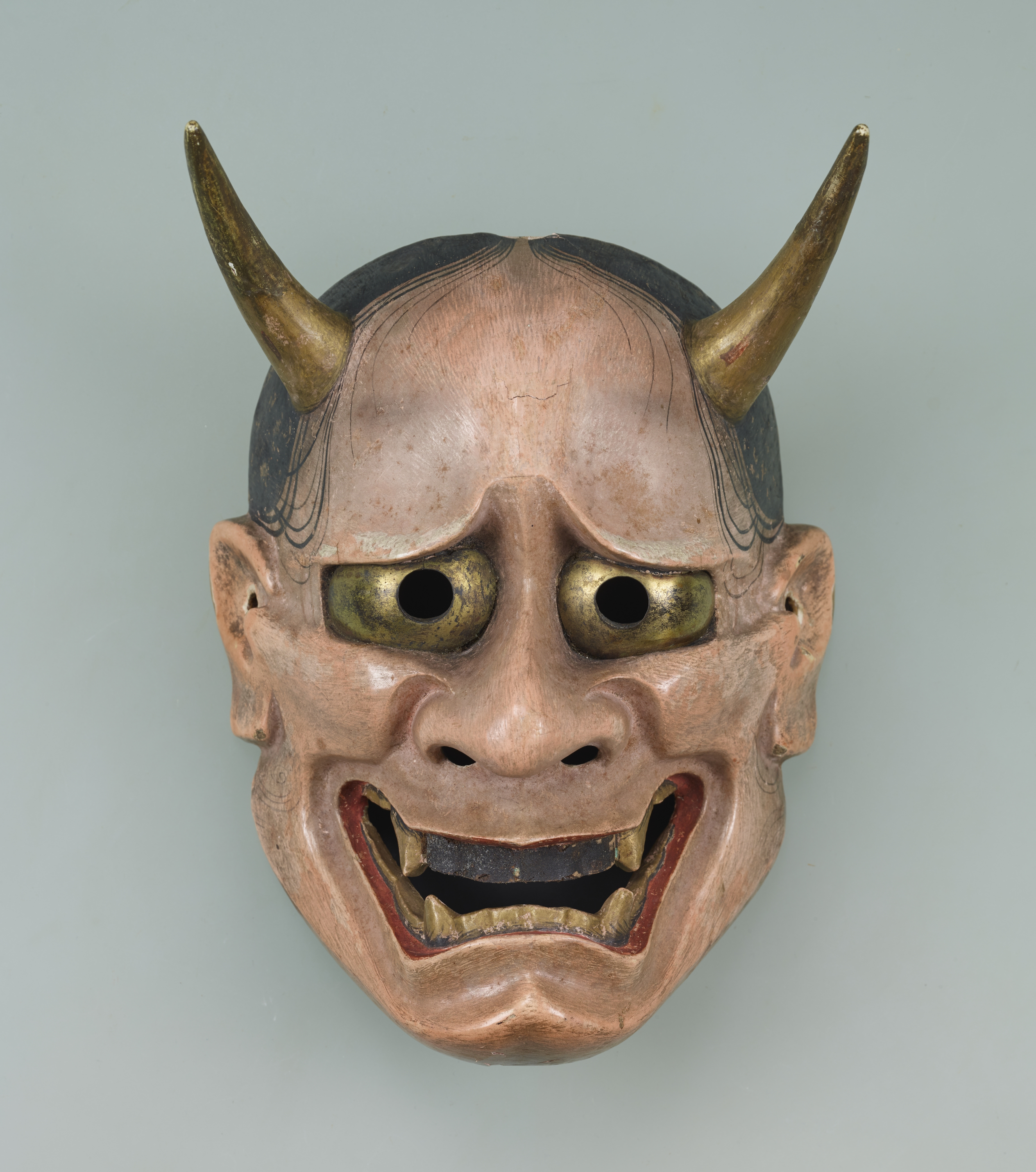
Noh mask of the hannya type. 17th or 18th century. Deemed Important Cultural Property.

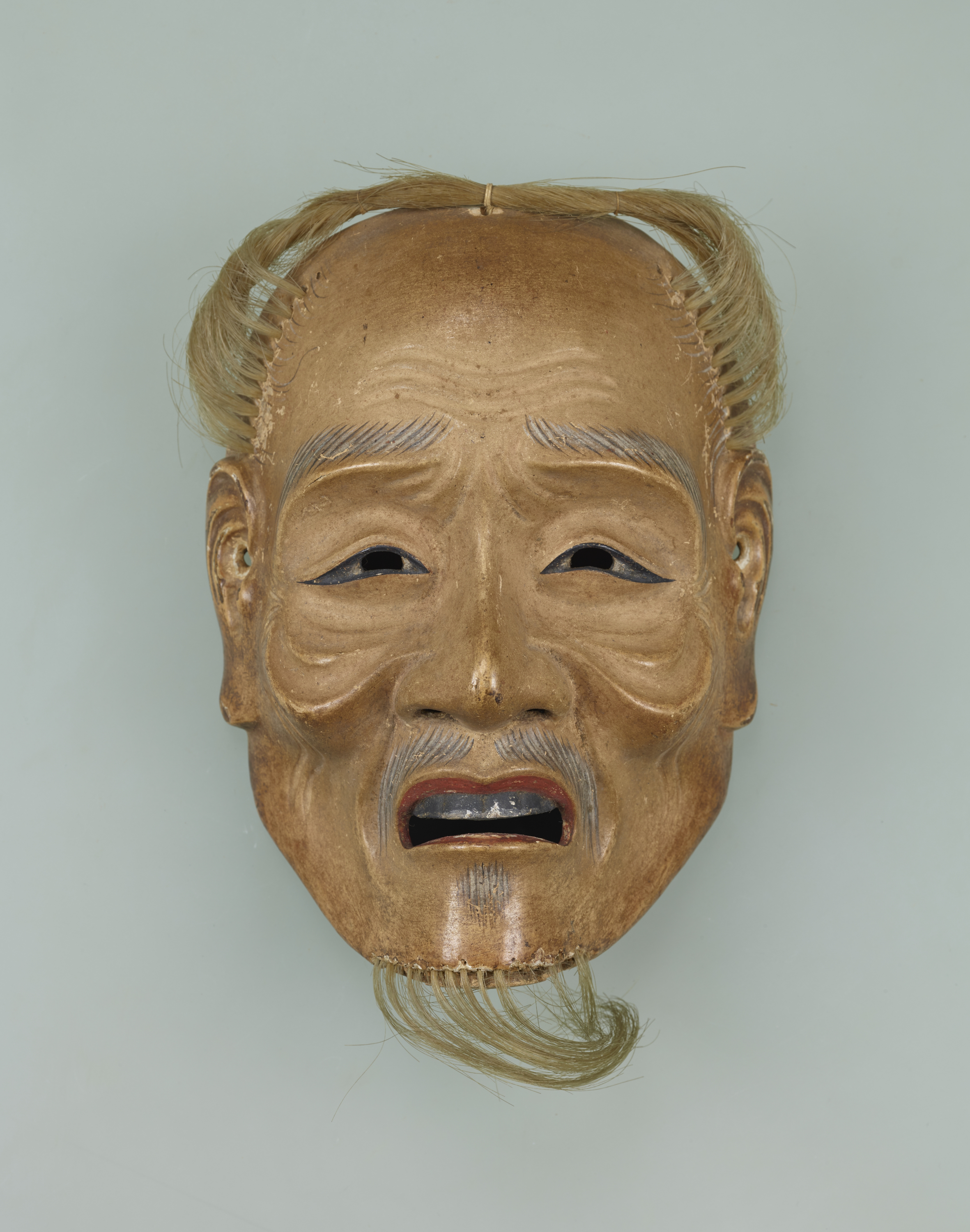
Noh mask of the akobujō type. 16th or 17th century. Deemed Important Cultural Property.

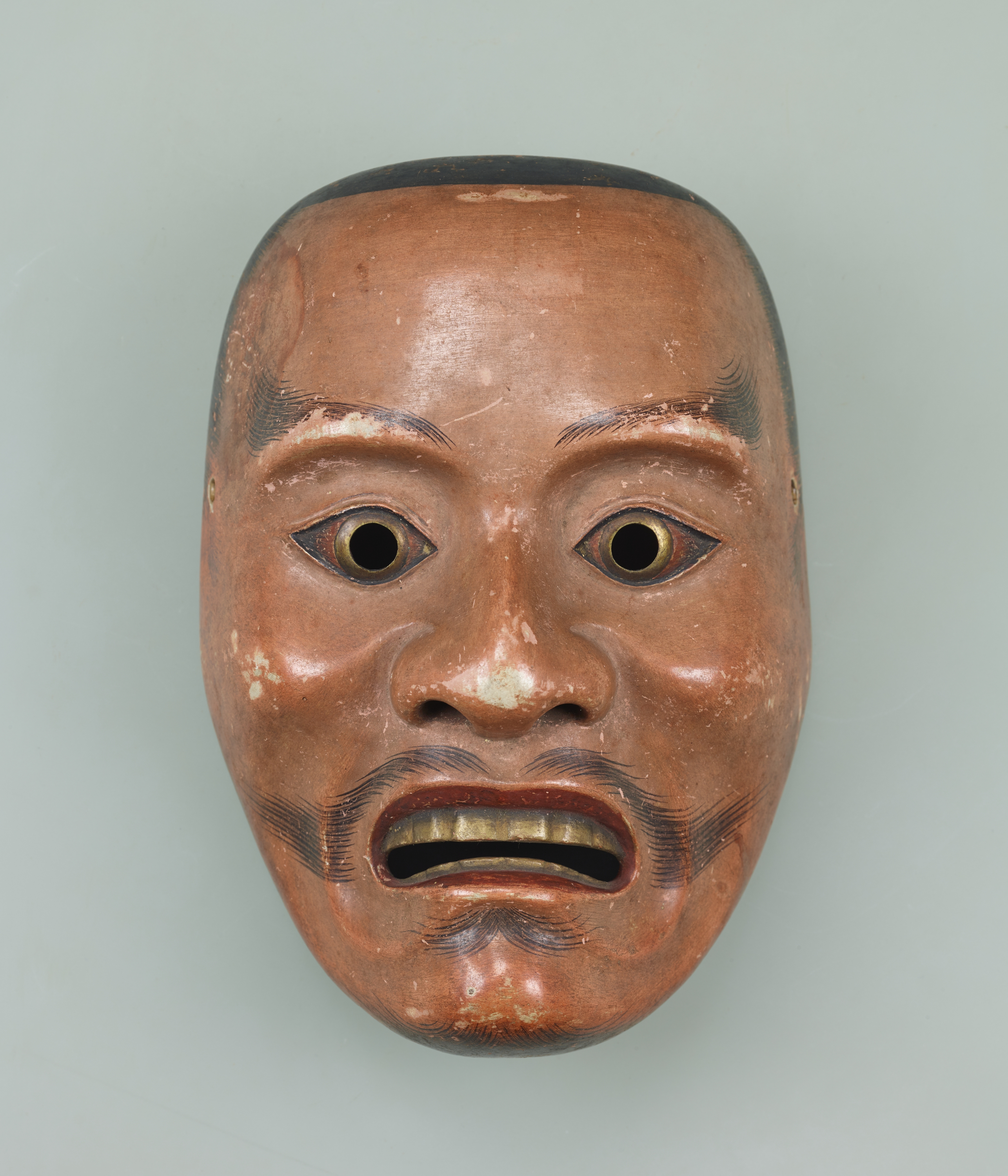
Noh mask of the ayahashi type. 17th century. Deemed Important Cultural Property.

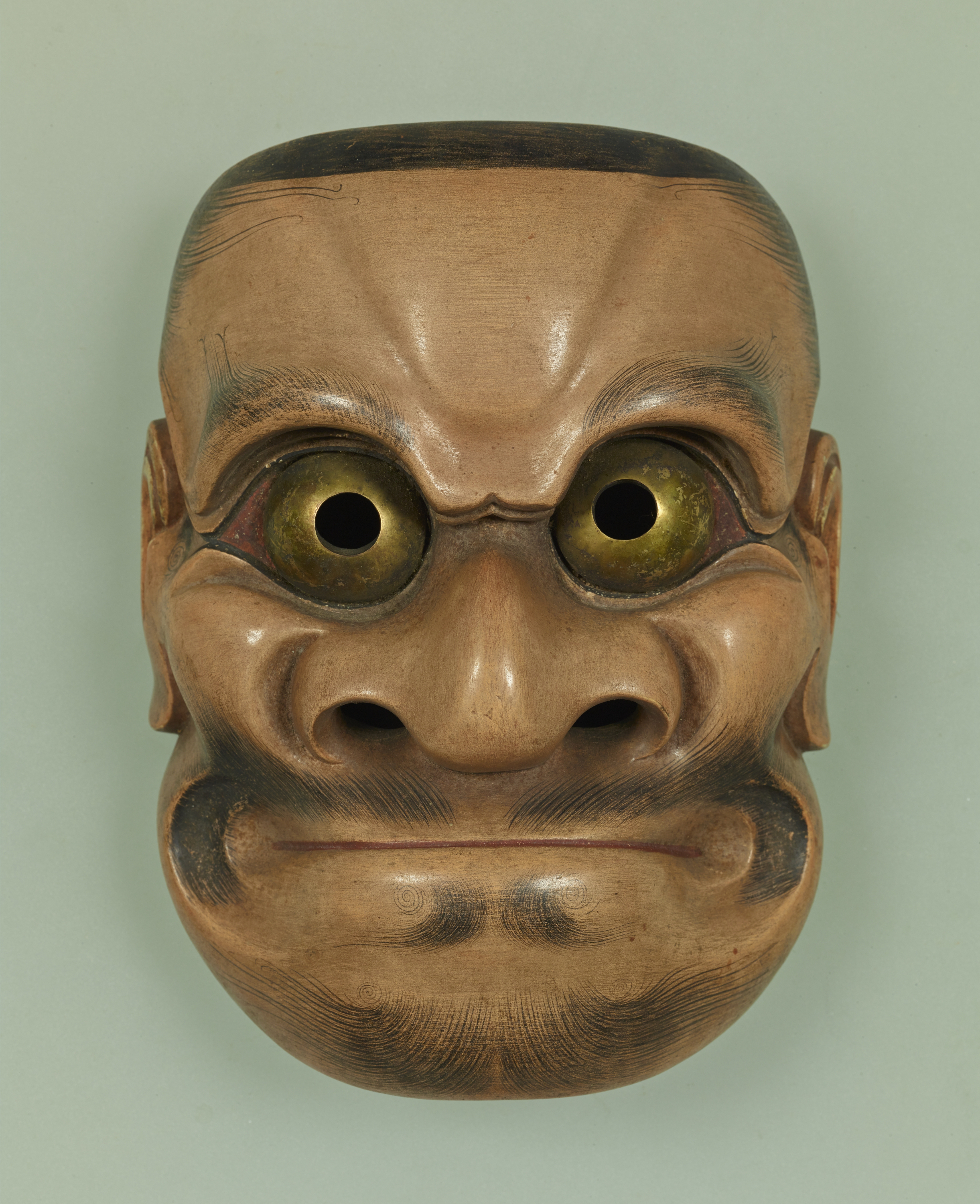
Noh mask of the chorei-beshimi type. 17th century. Deemed Important Cultural Property.

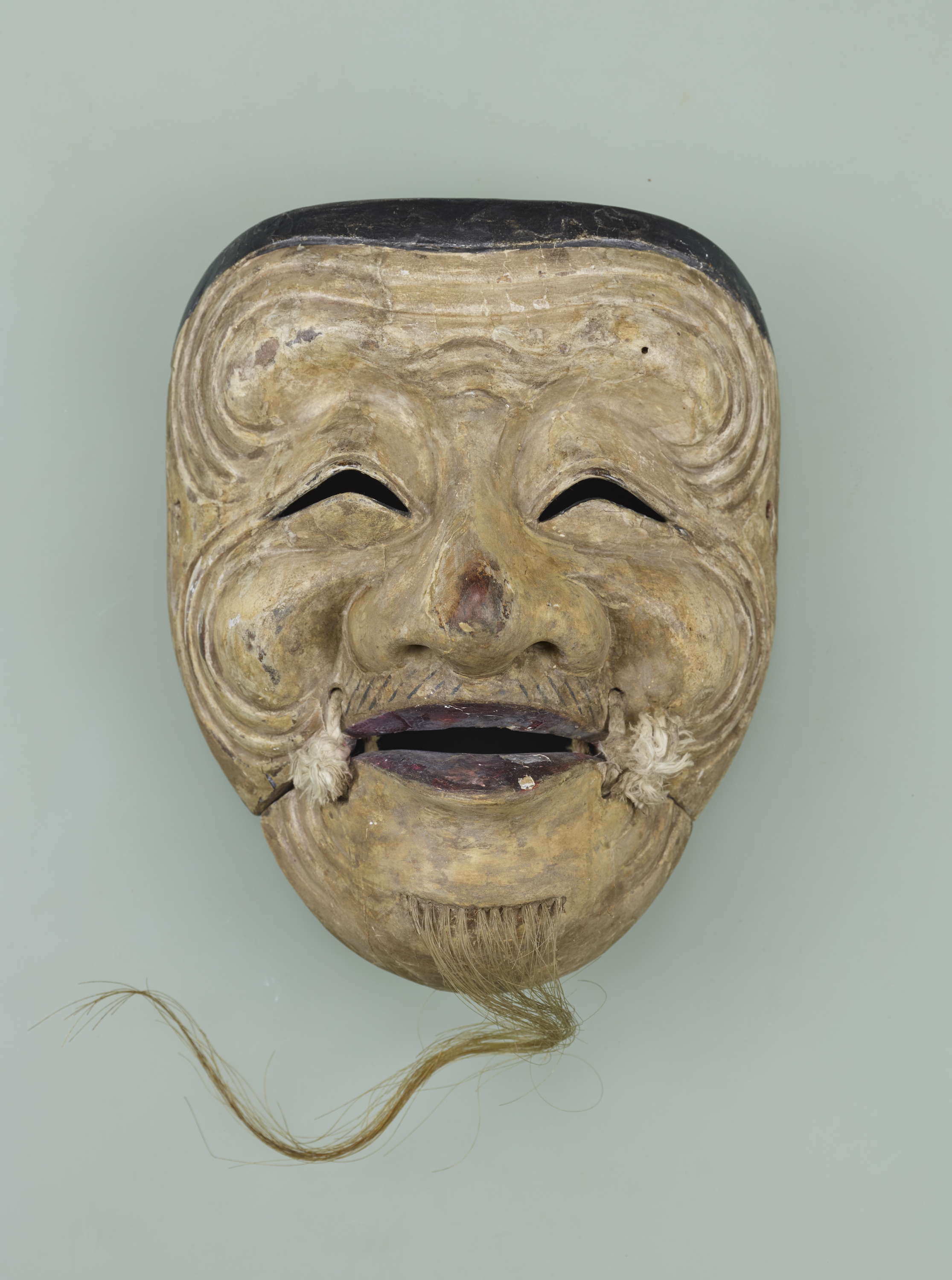
Noh mask of the hakushiki-jō type. 15th century. Deemed Important Cultural Property.

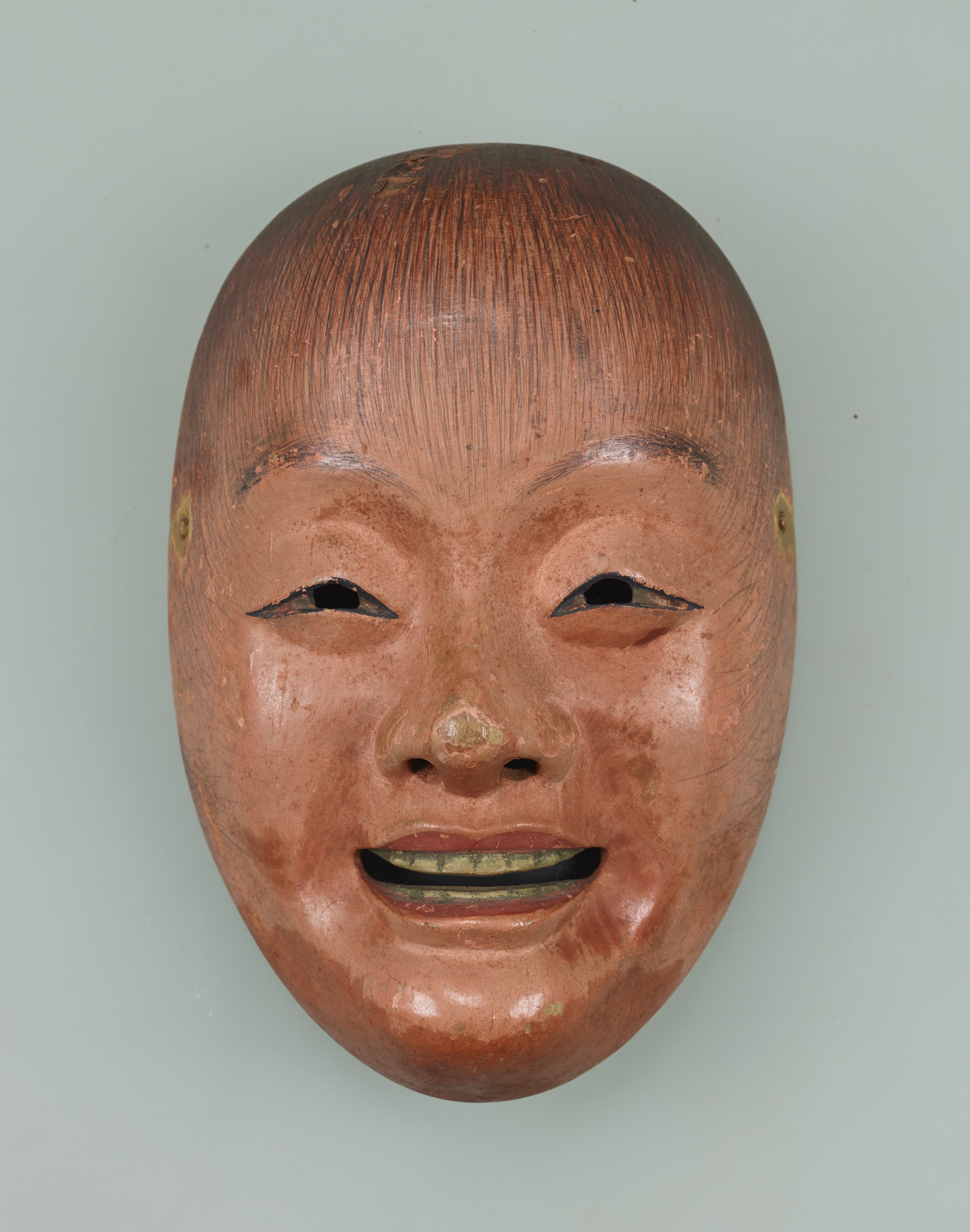
Noh mask of the shōjō type. 15th or 16th century. Deemed Important Cultural Property.

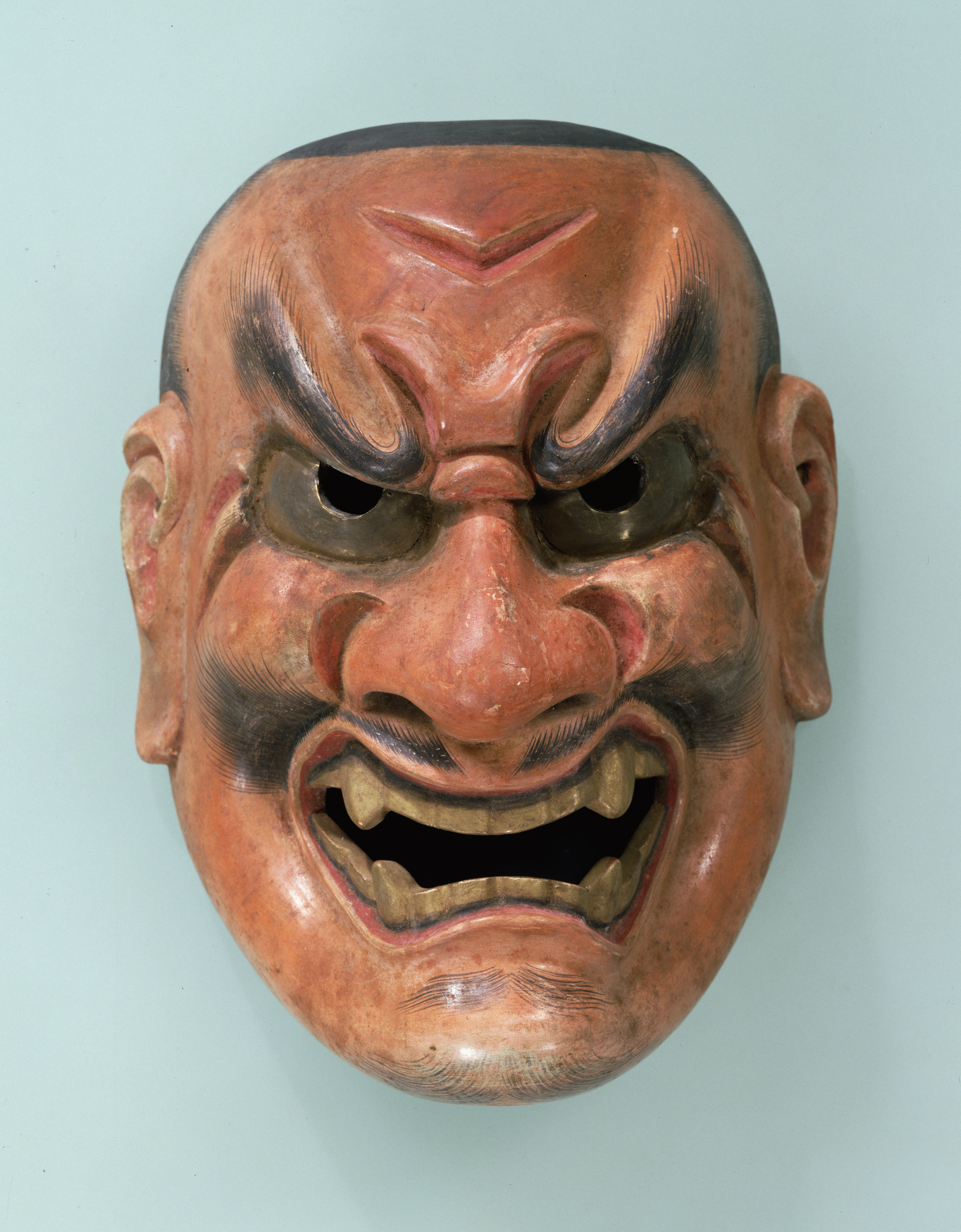
Noh mask of the shikami type. 17th or 18th century.

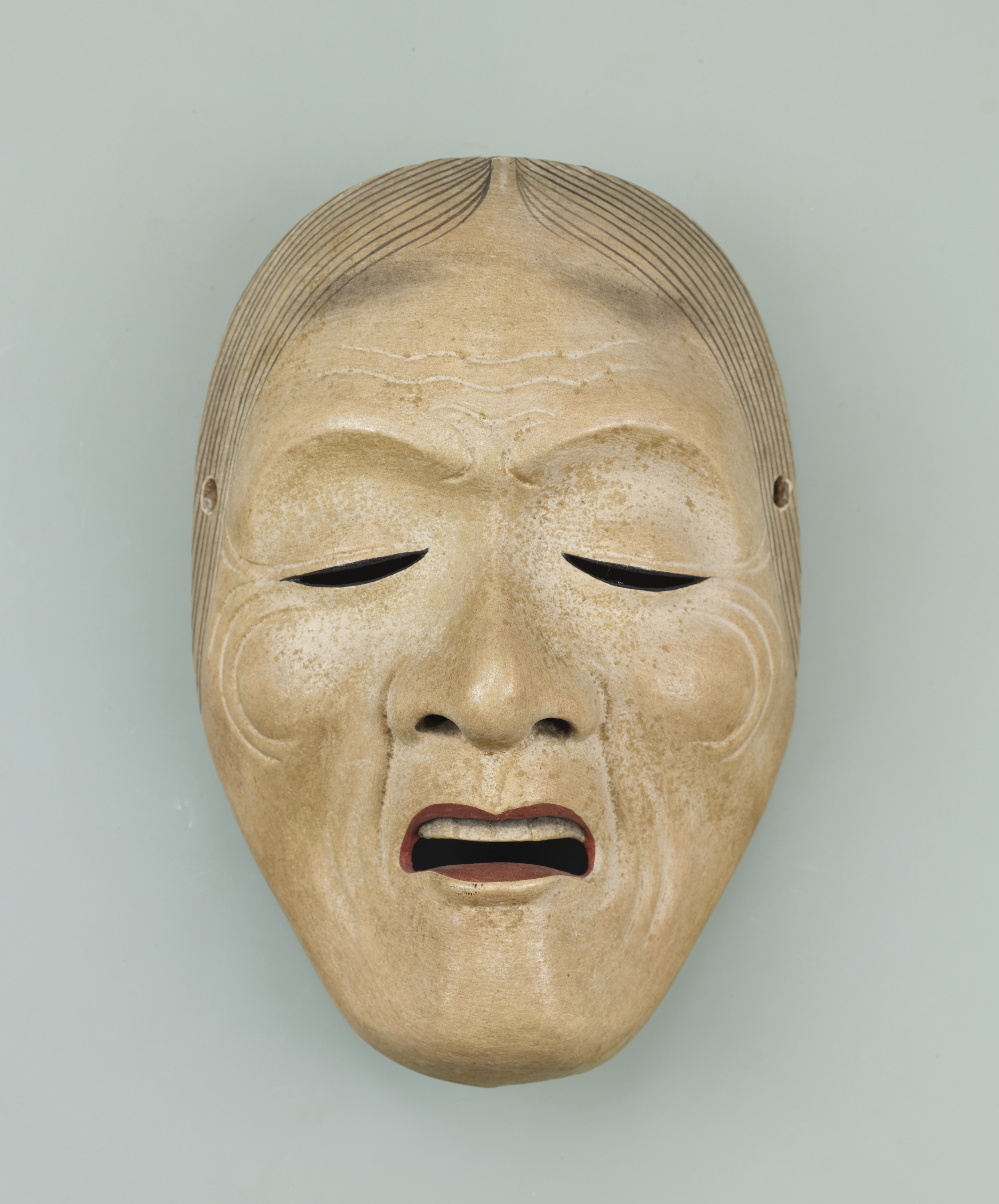
Noh mask of the uba type. 16th century. Deemed Important Cultural Property.

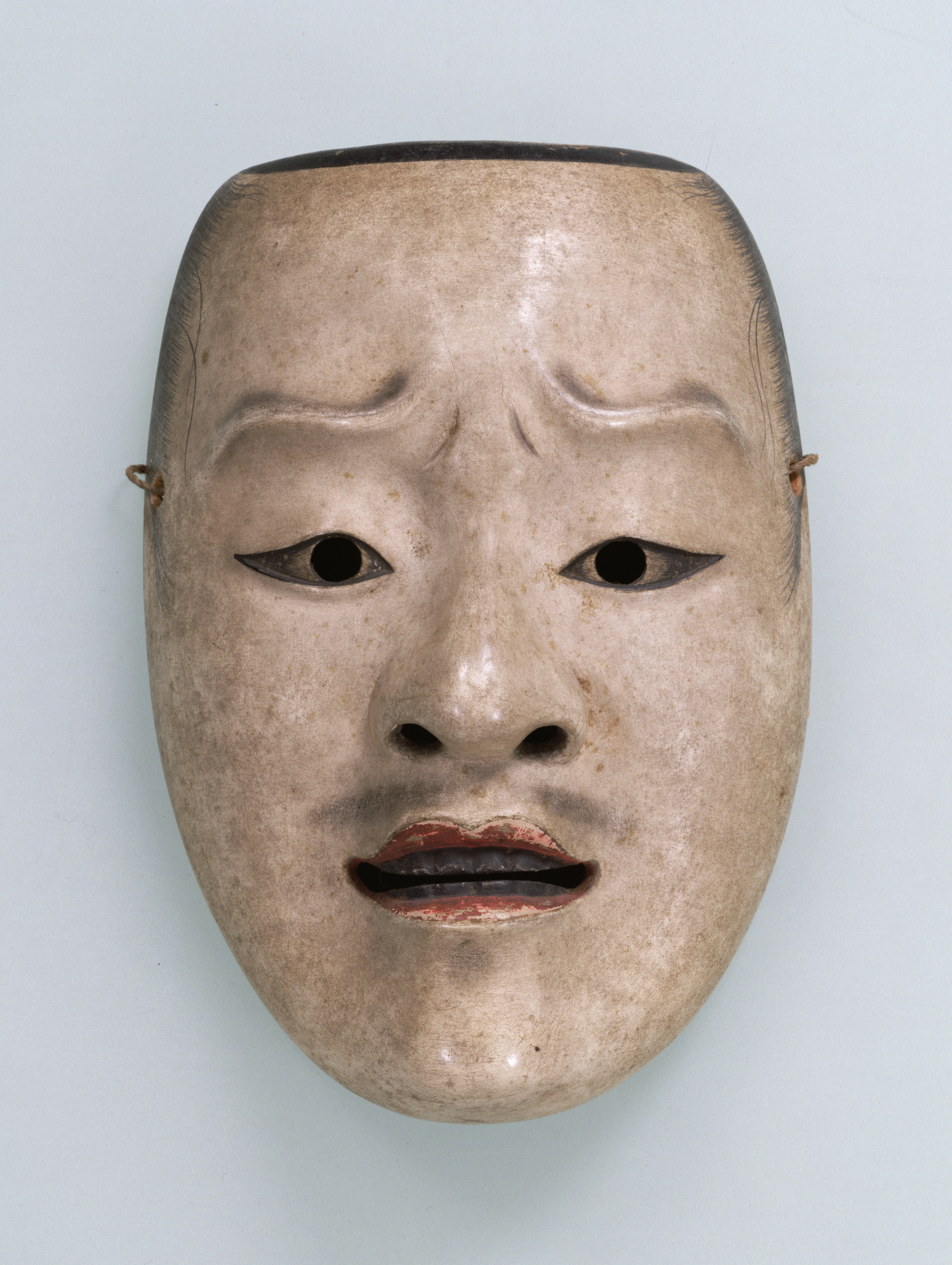
Noh mask of the wakaotoko type. 16th or 17th century.

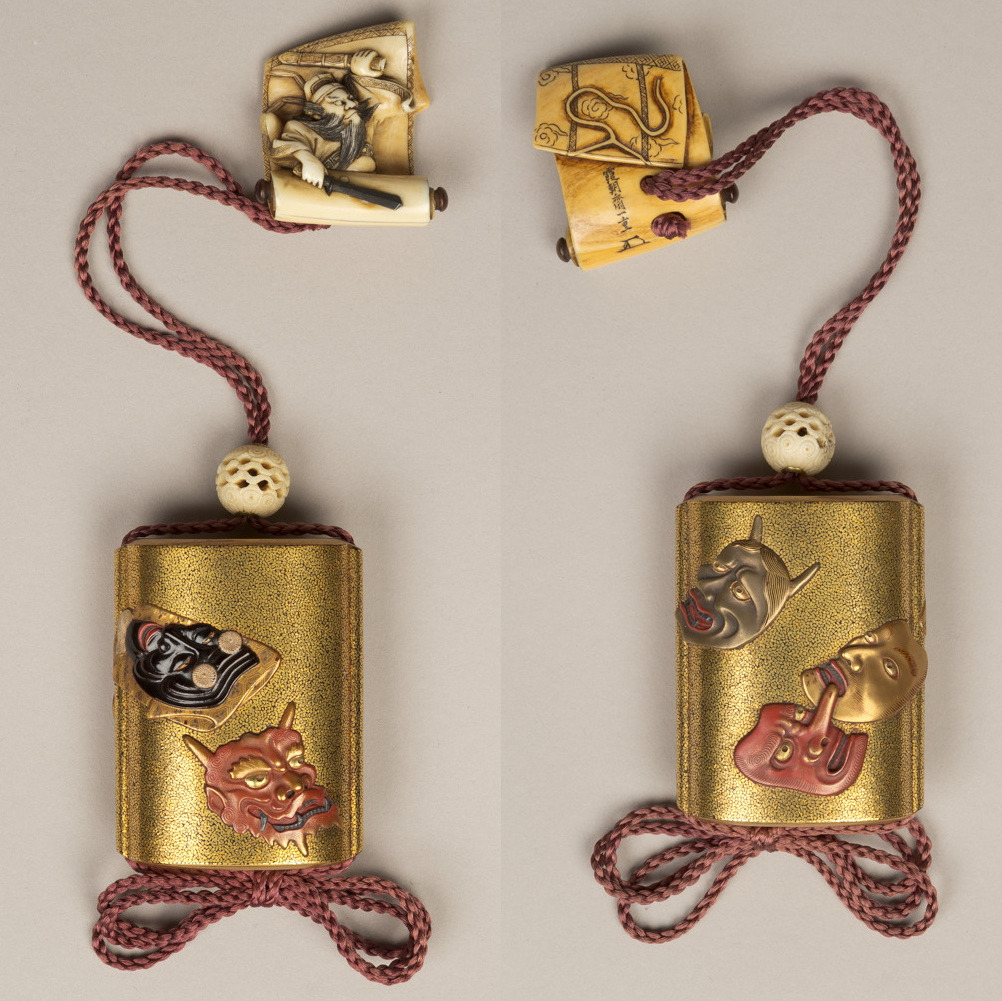
Inro with Noh masks. (front and back) early 19th century.

=== Stage ===
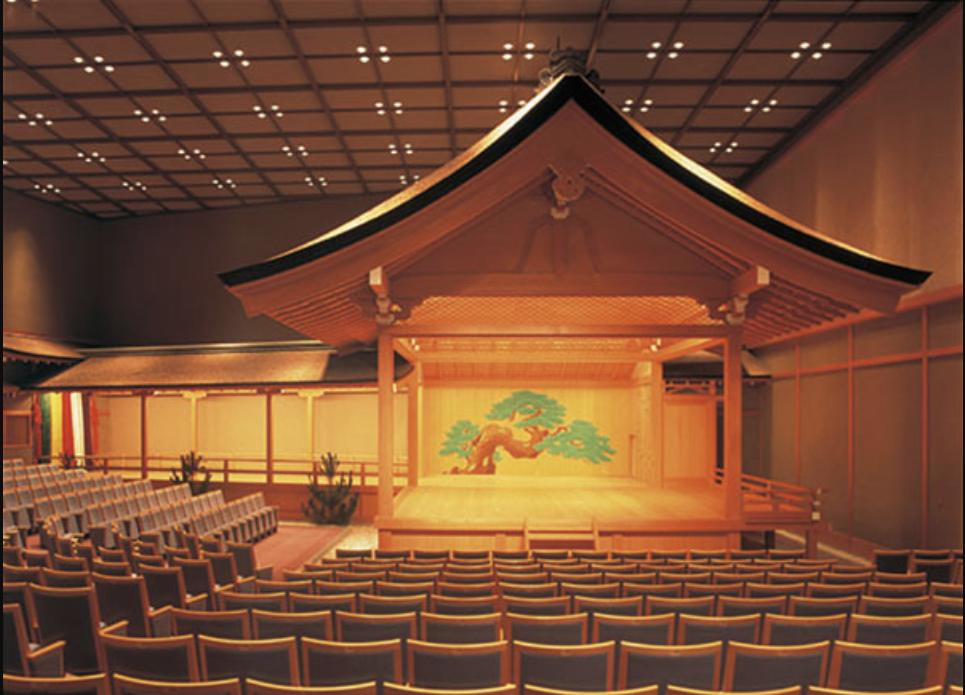
A modern Noh theatre with indoor roofed structure

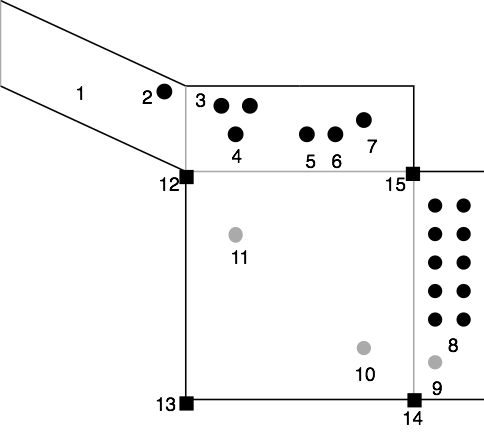
1: hashigakari. 2: kyōgen spot. 3: stage attendants. 4: stick drum. 5: hip drum. 6: shoulder drum. 7: flute. 8: chorus. 9: waki seat. 10: waki spot. 11: shite spot. 12: shite-bashira. 13: metsuke-bashira. 14: waki-bashira. 15: fue-bashira

The traditional Noh stage (butai) has complete openness that provides a shared experience between the performers and the audience throughout the performance. Without any proscenium or curtains to obstruct the view, the audience sees each actor even during the moments before they enter (and after they exit) the central "stage" (honbutai, "main stage"). The theatre itself is considered symbolic and treated with reverence both by the performers and the audience.

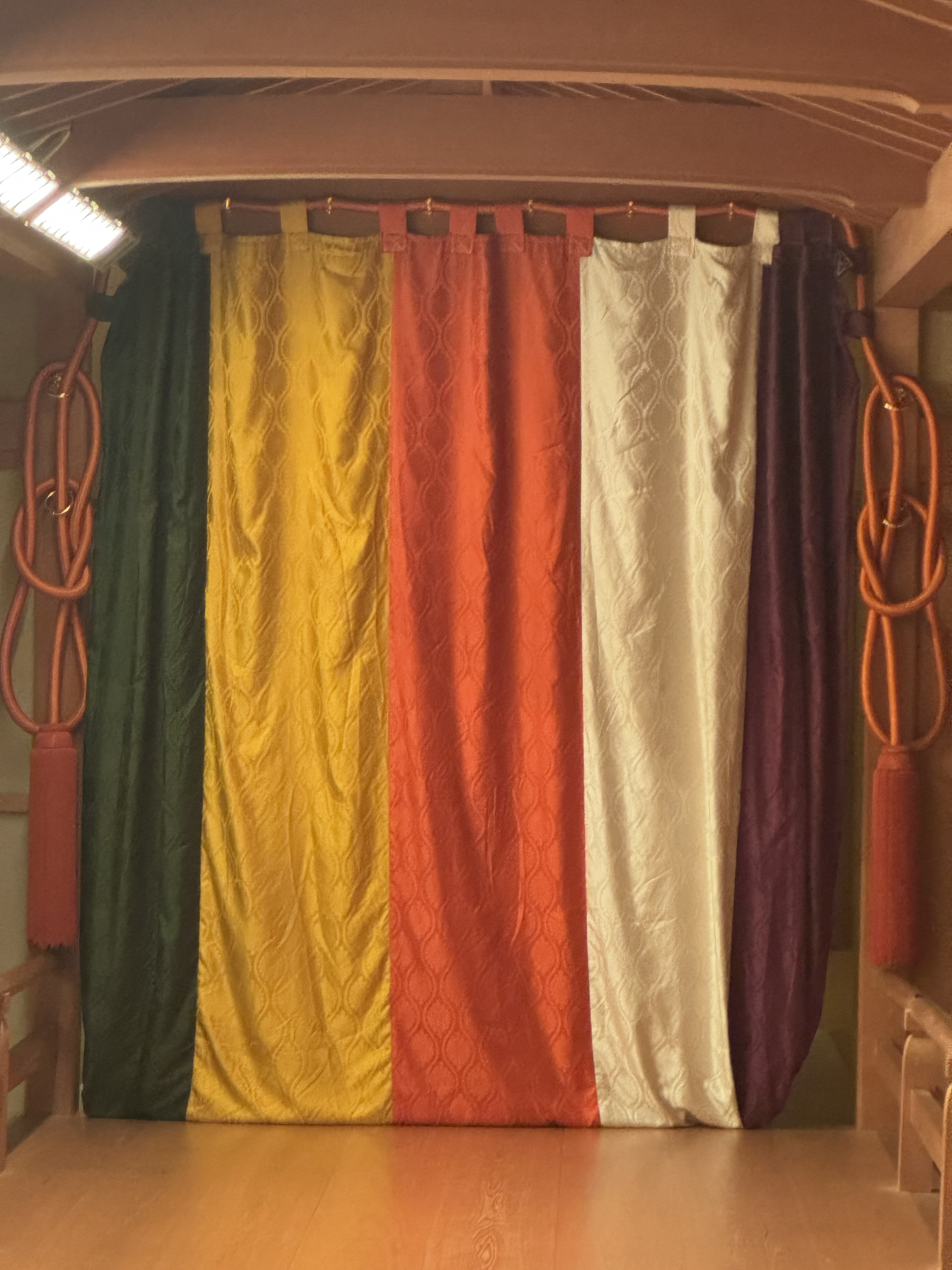
Standard 5-color agemaku curtain at the National Noh Theatre in Tokyo

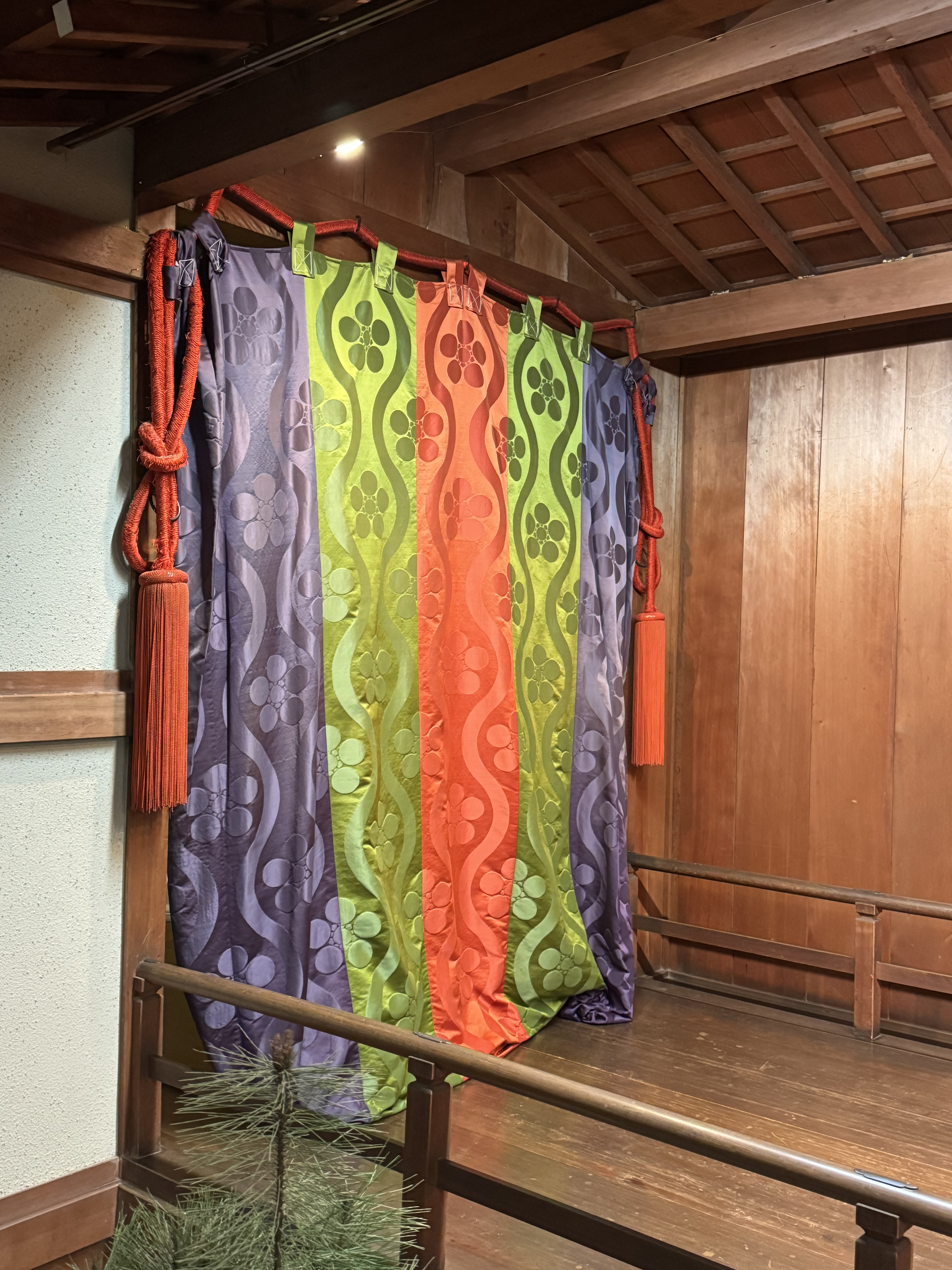
3-color agemaku curtain at the Ishikawa Prefectural Noh Theatre

4-color agemaku curtain at Hōshō Noh Theatre in Tokyo

One of the most recognizable characteristics of the Noh stage is its independent roof that hangs over the stage even in indoor theatres. Supported by four columns, the roof symbolizes the sanctity of the stage, with its architectural design derived from the worship pavilion (haiden) or sacred dance pavilion (kagura-den) of Shinto shrines. The roof also unifies the theatre space and defines the stage as an architectural entity.

The pillars supporting the roof are named shitebashira (principal character's pillar), metsukebashira (gazing pillar), wakibashira (secondary character's pillar), and fuebashira (flute pillar), clockwise from upstage right respectively. Each pillar is associated with the performers and their actions.

The stage is made entirely of unfinished hinoki, Japanese cypress, with almost no decorative elements. The poet and novelist Tōson Shimazaki writes that "on the stage of the Noh theatre there are no sets that change with each piece. Neither is there a curtain. There is only a simple panel (kagami-ita) with a painting of a green pine tree. This creates the impression that anything that could provide any shading has been banished. To break such monotony and make something happen is no easy thing."

Another unique feature of the stage is the hashigakari, a narrow bridge at upstage right used by actors to enter the stage. Hashigakari means "suspension bridge", signifying something aerial that connects two separate worlds on a same level. The bridge symbolizes the mythic nature of Noh plays in which otherworldly ghosts and spirits frequently appear. In contrast, hanamichi in Kabuki theatres is literally a path (michi) that connects two spaces in a single world, thus has a completely different significance.

=== Costumes ===
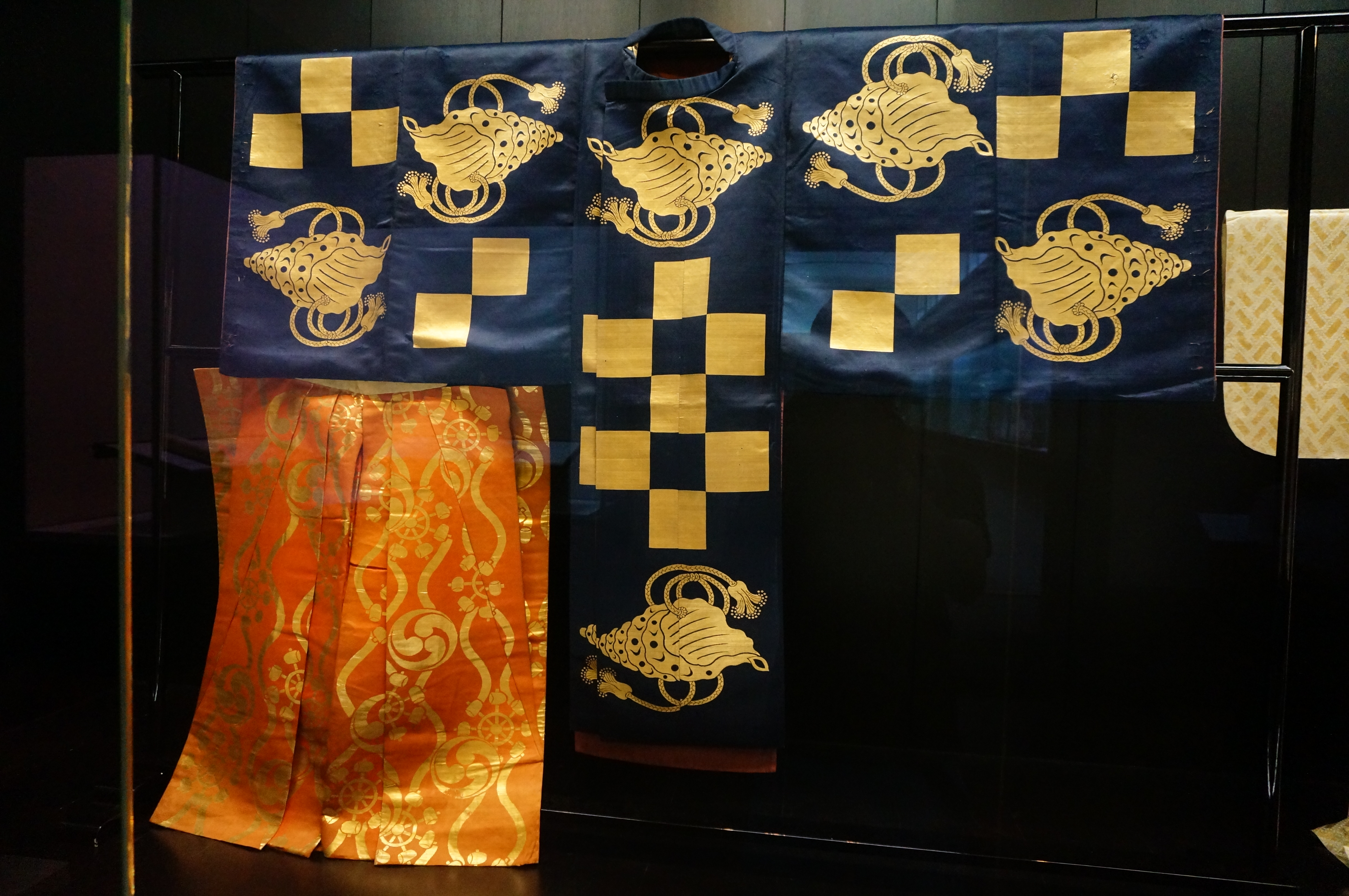
Noh Costume (Kariginu) with Checks and Conch Shells. Edo period, 18th century, Tokyo National Museum

Noh actors wear silk costumes called shozoku (robes) along with wigs, hats, and props such as the fan. Noh robes feature bold colors, elaborate texture, and intricate weave and embroidery. Costumes for the shite are especially sophisticated shimmering silk brocades, but are progressively less sumptuous for the tsure, the wakizure, and the aikyōgen.

For centuries, in accordance with the vision of Zeami, Noh costumes emulated the clothing that the characters would genuinely wear, such as the formal robes for a courtier and the street clothing for a peasant or commoner. But in the late sixteenth century, the costumes became stylized with certain symbolic and stylistic conventions. During the Edo (Tokugawa) period, the elaborate robes given to actors by noblemen and samurai in the Muromachi period were developed as costumes.

The musicians and chorus typically wear formal montsuki kimono (black and adorned with five family crests) accompanied by either hakama (a skirt-like garment) or kami-shimo, a combination of hakama and a waist-coat with exaggerated shoulders. Finally, the stage attendants are garbed in virtually unadorned black garments, much in the same way as stagehands in contemporary Western theatre.

=== Props ===
The use of props in Noh is minimalistic and stylized. The most commonly used prop in Noh is the fan, as it is carried by all performers regardless of role. Chorus singers and musicians may carry their fan in hand when entering the stage, or carry it tucked into the obi (the sash). The fan is usually placed at the performer's side when he or she takes position, and is often not taken up again until leaving the stage. During dance sequences, the fan is typically used to represent any and all hand-held props, such as a sword, wine jug, flute, or writing brush. The fan may represent various objects over the course of a single play.

When hand props other than fans are used, they are usually introduced or retrieved by kuroko who fulfill a similar role to stage crew in contemporary theatre. Like their Western counterparts, stage attendants for Noh traditionally dress in black, but unlike in Western theatre they may appear on stage during a scene, or may remain on stage during an entire performance, in both cases in plain view of the audience. The all-black costume of kuroko implies they are not part of the action on stage and are effectively invisible.

Set pieces in Noh such as the boats, wells, altars, and bells, are typically carried onto the stage before the beginning of the act in which they are needed. These props normally are only outlines to suggest actual objects, although the great bell, a perennial exception to most Noh rules for props, is designed to conceal the actor and to allow a costume change during the kyōgen interlude.

=== Chant and music ===
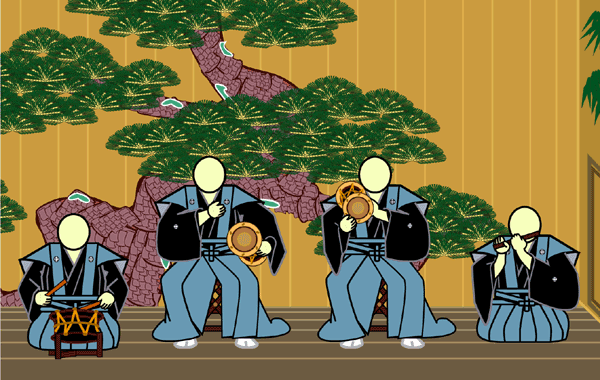
Hayashi-kata (noh musicians). Left to right: taiko, ōtsuzumi (hip drum), kotsuzumi (shoulder drum), flute

Noh theatre is accompanied by a chorus and a hayashi ensemble (Noh-bayashi 能囃子). Noh is a chanted drama, and a few commentators have dubbed it "Japanese opera". However, the singing in Noh involves a limited tonal range, with lengthy, repetitive passages in a narrow dynamic range. Texts are poetic, relying heavily on the Japanese seven-five rhythm common to nearly all forms of Japanese poetry, with an economy of expression, and an abundance of allusion. The singing parts of Noh are called "Utai" and the speaking parts "Kataru". The music has many blank spaces (ma) in between the actual sounds, and these negative blank spaces are in fact considered the heart of the music. In addition to utai, Noh hayashi ensemble consists of four musicians, also known as the "hayashi-kata", including three drummers, which play the shime-daiko, ōtsuzumi (hip drum), and kotsuzumi (shoulder drum) respectively, and a nohkan flutist.

The chant is not always performed "in character"; that is, sometimes the actor will speak lines or describe events from the perspective of another character or even a disinterested narrator. Far from breaking the rhythm of the performance, this is actually in keeping with the otherworldly feel of many Noh plays, especially in those characterized as mugen.

== Plays ==
There are 240 in the current repertoire performed by the five existing Noh schools. However, roughly 2,000 plays created for Noh are known today. The current repertoire is heavily influenced by the taste of aristocratic class in Tokugawa period and does not necessarily reflect popularity among the commoners. There are several ways to classify Noh plays.

=== Subject ===
All Noh plays can be classified into three broad categories.

- Genzai Noh (現在能, "present Noh") features human characters and events unfold according to a linear timeline within the play.
- Mugen Noh (夢幻能, "supernatural Noh") involves supernatural worlds, featuring gods, spirits, ghosts, or phantasms in the shite role. Time is often depicted as passing in a non-linear fashion, and action may switch between two or more timeframes from moment to moment, including flashbacks.
- Ryōkake Noh (両掛能, "mixed Noh"), though somewhat uncommon, is a hybrid of the above with the first act being Genzai Noh and the second act Mugen Noh.

While Genzai Noh utilizes internal and external conflicts to drive storylines and bring out emotions, Mugen Noh focuses on utilizing flashbacks of the past and the deceased to invoke emotions.

=== Performance style ===
Additionally, all Noh plays may be categorized by their style.

- Geki Noh (劇能) is a drama piece based around the advancement of plot and the narration of action.
- Furyū Noh (風流能) is little more than a dance piece characterized by elaborate stage action, often involving acrobatics, stage properties, and multiple characters.

=== Theme ===
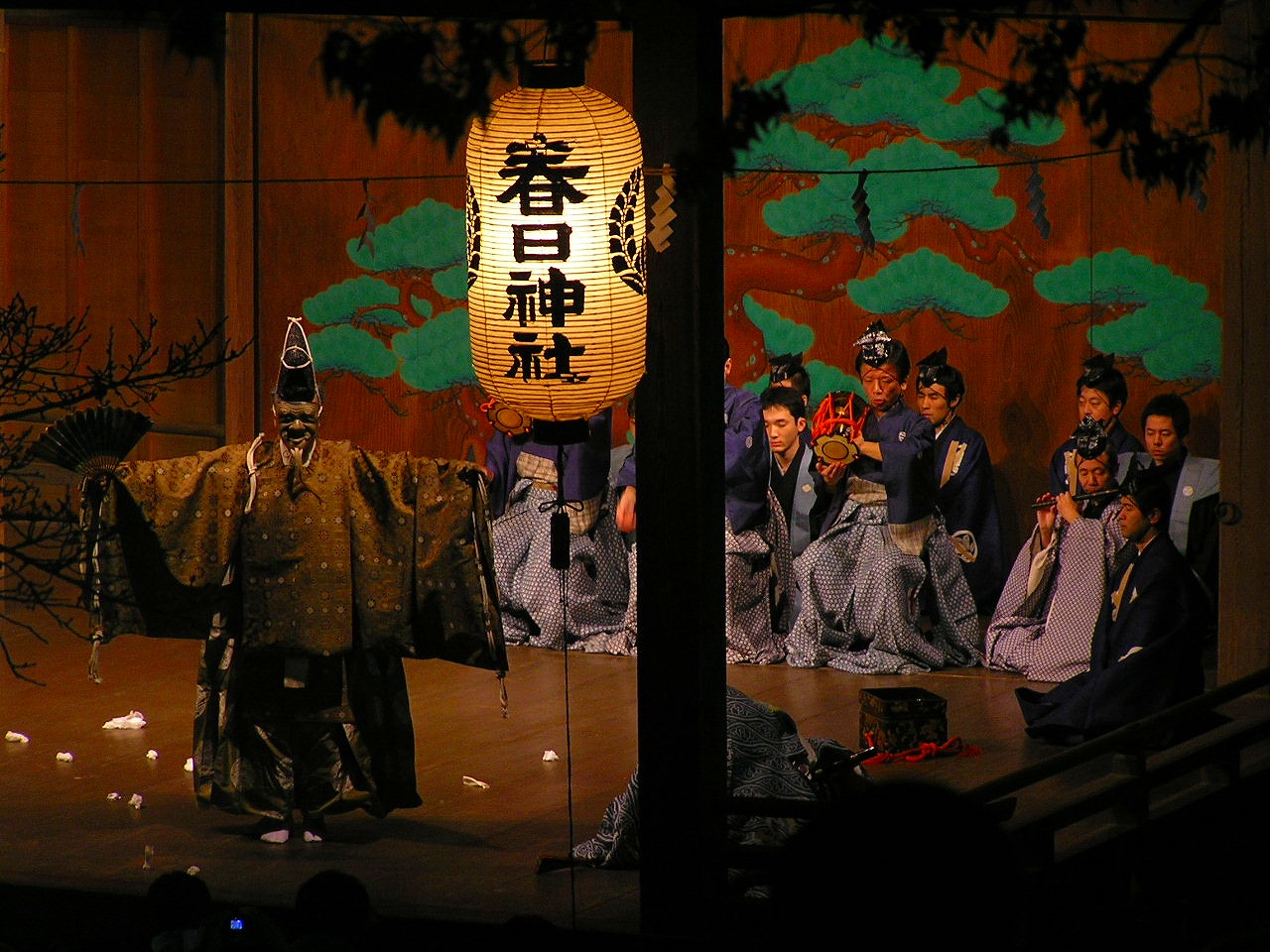
Okina hōnō (dedication of Noh play A Venerable Old Man) on New Year's Day

All Noh plays are divided by their themes into the following five categories. This classification is considered the most practical, and is still used in formal programming choices today. Traditionally, a formal 5-play program is composed of a selection from each of the groups.

1. Kami mono (神物, god plays) or waki Noh (脇能) typically feature the shite in the role of a deity to tell the mythic story of a shrine or praise a particular god. Many of them structured in two acts, the deity takes a human form in disguise in the first act and reveals the real self in the second act. (e.g. Takasago, Chikubushima)
2. Shura mono (修羅物, warrior plays) or ashura Noh (阿修羅能) takes its name from the Buddhist underworld. The protagonist appearing as a ghost of a famous samurai pleads to a monk for salvation and the drama culminates in a glorious re-enactment of the scene of his death in a full war costume. (e.g. Tamura, Atsumori)
3. Katsura mono (鬘物, wig plays) or onna mono (女物, woman plays) depict the shite in a female role and feature some of the most refined songs and dances in all of Noh, reflecting the smooth and flowing movements representing female characters. (e.g. Basho, Matsukaze)
4. There are about 94 "miscellaneous" plays traditionally performed in the fourth place in a five-play program. These plays include subcategories kyōran mono (狂乱物, madness plays), onryō mono (怨霊物, vengeful ghost plays), genzai mono (現在物, present plays), as well as others. (e.g. Aya no tsuzumi, Kinuta)
5. Kiri Noh (切り能, final plays) or oni mono (鬼物, demon plays) usually feature the shite in the role of monsters, goblins, or demons, and are often selected for their bright colors and fast-paced, tense finale movements. Kiri Noh is performed the last in a five-play program. There are roughly 30 plays in this category, most of which are shorter than the plays in the other categories.

In addition to the above five sorts of plays, Okina (翁) (or Kamiuta) is frequently performed at the very beginning of the program, especially at New Year, holidays, and other special occasions. Combining dance with Shinto ritual, it is considered the oldest type of Noh play.

=== Famous plays ===
The following categorization is that of the Kanze school.

Name	Kanji	Meaning	Category
Aoi no Ue	葵上	Lady Aoi	4 (misc.)
Aya no Tsuzumi	綾鼓	The Damask Drum	4 (misc.)
Dōjōji	道成寺	Dōjō Temple	4 (misc.)
Hagoromo	羽衣	The Feather Mantle	3 (woman)
Izutsu	井筒	The Well Cradle	3 (woman)
Matsukaze	松風	The Wind in the Pines	3 (woman)
Sekidera Komachi	関寺小町	Komachi at Seki Temple	3 (woman)
Shōjō	猩々	The Tippling Elf	5 (demon)
Sotoba Komachi	卒都婆小町	Komachi at the Gravepost	3 (woman)
Takasago	高砂	At Takasago	1 (deity)
Yorimasa	頼政	Yorimasa	2 (warrior)

== Influence in the West ==
Many Western artists have been influenced by Noh.

=== Theatre practitioners ===
- Eugenio Barba – Between 1966 and 1972, Japanese Noh Masters Hideo Kanze and Hisao Kanze gave seminars on Noh at Barba's Theater Laboratory of Holstebro. Barba primarily studied the physical aspects of Noh.
- Samuel Beckett – Yoshihiko Ikegami considers Beckett's Waiting for Godot a parody of Noh, particularly Kami Noh, in which a god or a spirit appears before a secondary character as the protagonist. Ikegami argues that "the dramatic conflict which was much in evidence in Yeats is so completely discarded that Beckett's theatre (where 'nothing happens') comes to look even closer to Noh than Yeats's did."
- Bertolt Brecht – According to Maria P. Alter, Brecht began reading Japanese plays during the middle twenties and have read at least 20 Noh plays translated into German by 1929. Brecht's Der Jasager is an adaptation of a Noh play Taniko. Brecht himself identified Die Massnahme as an adaptation of Noh play.
- Peter Brook – Yoshi Oida, a Japanese actor with training in Noh, began working with Brook in their production of The Tempest in 1968. Oida later joined Brook's company.
- Paul Claudel – According to John Willett, Paul Claudel learned about Noh during the time he served as French Ambassador to Japan. Claudel's opera Christophe Colomb shows an unmistakable influence of the Noh.
- Jacques Copeau – In 1923, Copeau worked on a Noh play, Kantan, along with Suzanne Bing at Théâtre du Vieux-Colombier, without ever having seen a Noh play. Thomas Leabhart states that "Jacques Copeau was drawn instinctively by taste and tendency to a restrained theatre which was based in spirituality." Copeau praised Noh theatre in writing when he finally saw a production in 1930.
- Guillaume Gallienne - Deguchinashi (Huis-Clos) by Jean-Paul Sartre, a Noh version of Sartre's play directed by Guillaume Gallienne at the Noh Tessenkai theatre, Tokyo in 2006.
- Jacques Lecoq – Physical theatre taught at L'École Internationale de Théâtre Jacques Lecoq founded by Lecoq is influenced by Noh.
- Eugene O'Neill – O'Neill's plays The Iceman Cometh, Long Day's Journey into Night, and Hughie have various similarities to Noh plays.
- Thornton Wilder – Wilder himself expressed his interest in Noh in his "Preface” to Three Plays and his sister Isabel Wilder also confirmed his interests. Wilder's work Our Town incorporates various elements of Noh such as lack of plot, representative characters, and use of ghosts.

=== Composers ===
- William Henry Bell – An English composer Bell wrote music for modern presentation of several Noh plays, including Komachi (1925), Tsuneyo of the Three Trees (1926), Hatsuyuki (1934), The Pillow of Kantan (1935), and Kageyiko (1936).
- Benjamin Britten – Britten visited Japan in 1956 and saw for the first time Japanese Noh plays, which he called "some of the most wonderful drama I have ever seen." The influences were seen and heard in his ballet The Prince of the Pagodas (1957) and later in two of the three semi-operatic "Parables for Church Performance": Curlew River (1964) and The Prodigal Son (1968).
- David Byrne – Byrne encountered Noh when he was on tour in Japan with Talking Heads and he was inspired by the highly stylized practices of Noh, completely different from its Western counterparts that focus on naturalism. According to Josh Kun, "Japanese Noh theatre inspired him to design the oversize business suit that became a visual staple of Talking Heads live shows."
- Alan Watts – 20th century philosopher, the liner notes from his third song off the 1962 album 'This is IT' state "Watts in a Japanese no-noh."
- Harry Partch – Partch called his work Delusion of the Fury "a ritualistic web". Kate Molleson wrote for 'The Guardian that "the narrative is a bleary mix of Japanese Noh theatre, Ethiopian folk mythology, Greek drama and his own wacky imagination". Will Salmon cites Partch himself writing, "Noh has been for centuries a fine art, one of the most sophisticated the world has known." Delusion of the Fury incorporates two Noh plays, Atsumori by Zeami and Ikuta by Zenbō Motoyasu, into its story.
- Karlheinz Stockhausen – The essentially plotless libretto of Stockhausen's grand operatic cycle Licht ("Light") is based on "a mythology drawing on multiple cultural traditions, from Japanese Noh theatre to German folklore".
- Iannis Xenakis – Xenakis "admired Noh, the venerable theatrical form known for its ritualistic formality and gestural complexity." Electronic Music Foundation presented Xenakis & Japan in March 2010, "a dance/music event highlighting Xenakis' lifelong interest in Japanese music and theatre". The event featured a female Noh performer, Ryoko Aoki.

=== Classicists ===
- Scholar Akiko Kiso collaborated with Mae J. Smethurst, writing and translating several works that compared the Greek tragedy form of theatre with noh.

=== Poets ===
- W. B. Yeats – Yeats wrote an essay on Noh titled "Certain Noble Plays of Japan" in 1916. As much as he tried to learn Noh, there were limited resources available in England at the time. The lack of complete understanding of Noh led him to create innovative works guided by his own imagination and what he fantasized Noh to be. Yeats wrote four plays heavily influenced by Noh, using ghosts or supernatural beings as the central dramatis personae for the first time. The plays are At the Hawk's Well, The Dreaming of the Bones, The Words upon the Window-Pane, and Purgatory.

== Aesthetic terminology ==
Zeami and Zenchiku describe a number of distinct qualities that are thought to be essential to the proper understanding of Noh as an art form.

- Hana (花, flower): In the Kadensho (Instructions on the Posture of the Flower), Zeami describes hana saying "after you master the secrets of all things and exhaust the possibilities of every device, the hana that never vanishes still remains." The true Noh performer seeks to cultivate a rarefied relationship with his audience similar to the way that one cultivates flowers. What is notable about hana is that, like a flower, it is meant to be appreciated by any audience, no matter how lofty or how coarse his upbringing. Hana comes in two forms. Individual hana is the beauty of the flower of youth, which passes with time, while "true hana" is the flower of creating and sharing perfect beauty through performance.
- Yūgen (幽玄, profound sublimity): Yūgen is a concept valued in various forms of art throughout Japanese culture. Originally used to mean elegance or grace representing the perfect beauty in waka, yūgen is invisible beauty that is felt rather than seen in a work of art. The term is used specifically in relation to Noh to mean the profound beauty of the transcendental world, including mournful beauty involved in sadness and loss.
- Rōjaku (老弱): Rō means old, and jaku means tranquil and quiet. Rōjaku is the final stage of performance development of the Noh actor, in which he eliminates all unnecessary action or sound in the performance, leaving only the true essence of the scene or action being imitated.
- Kokoro or shin (both 心): Defined as "heart", "mind", or both. The kokoro of noh is that which Zeami speaks of in his teachings, and is more easily defined as "mind." To develop hana the actor must enter a state of no-mind, or mushin.
- Myō (妙): the "charm" of an actor who performs flawlessly and without any sense of imitation; he effectively becomes his role.
- Monomane (物真似, imitation or mimesis): the intent of a Noh actor to accurately depict the motions of his role, as opposed to purely aesthetic reasons for abstraction or embellishment. Monomane is sometimes contrasted with yūgen, although the two represent endpoints of a continuum rather than being completely separate.
- Kabu-isshin (歌舞一心, "song-dance-one heart"): the theory that the song (including poetry) and dance are two halves of the same whole, and that the Noh actor strives to perform both with total unity of heart and mind.

== Existing Noh theatres ==
Noh is still regularly performed today in public theatres as well as private theatres mostly located in major cities. There are more than 70 Noh theatres throughout Japan, presenting both professional and amateur productions.

Public theatres include National Noh Theatre (Tokyo), Nagoya Noh Theater, Ishikawa Prefectural Noh Theater, and Fukuoka Noh Theater. Each Noh school has its own permanent theatre, such as Kanze Noh Theater (Tokyo), Hosho Noh Theater (Tokyo), Kita Noh Theatre (Tokyo), Kongo Noh Theater (Kyoto), Nara Komparu Noh Theater (Nara), and Taka no Kai (Fukuoka). Additionally, there are various prefectural and municipal theatres located throughout Japan that present touring professional companies and local amateur companies. In some regions, unique regional Noh such as Ogisai Kurokawa Noh have developed to form schools independent from five traditional schools.

== Audience etiquette ==
Audience etiquette is generally similar to formal Western theatre, where the audience quietly watches. Surtitles are rarely used (e.g., at the National Noh Theatre in Tokyo), but some audience members follow along in the libretto. Because there are no curtains on the stage, the performance begins with the actors entering the stage and ends with their leaving the stage. The house lights are usually kept on during the performances, creating an intimate feel that provides a shared experience between the performers and the audience.

At the end of the play, the actors file out slowly (most important first, with gaps between actors), and while they are on the bridge (hashigakari), the audience claps restrainedly. Between actors, clapping ceases, then begins again as the next actor leaves. Unlike in Western theatre, there is no bowing, nor do the actors return to the stage after having left. A play may end with the shite character leaving the stage as part of the story (as in Kokaji, for instance), rather than ending with all characters on stage, in which case one claps as the character exits.

During the interval, tea, coffee, and wagashi (Japanese sweets) may be served in the lobby. In the Edo period, when Noh was a day-long affair, more substantial makunouchi' bentō (幕の内弁当, "between-acts lunchbox") were served. On special occasions, when the performance is over, お神酒 (o-miki, ceremonial sake) may be served in the lobby on the way out, as it happens in Shinto rituals.

The audience is seated in front of the stage, to the left side of the stage, and in the corner front-left of stage; these are in order of decreasing desirability. While the metsuke-bashira pillar obstructs the view of the stage, the actors are primarily at the corners, not the center, and thus the two aisles are located where the views of the two main actors would be obscured, ensuring a generally clear view regardless of seating.

== See also ==
- List of Noh plays
- Higashiyama culture
- Shuhari
- Theatre of Japan
- Glossary of Japanese theater
