= The World Is Dancing =

Japanese manga series

- Cover of the first English volume

ワールド イズ ダンシング (Wārudo Izu Danshingu)
- Genre: Historical
- Manga
- Written by: Kazuto Mihara
- Published by: Kodansha
- English publisher: NA: Kodansha USA
- Imprint: Morning KC
- Magazine: Morning
- Original run: March 25, 2021 – October 27, 2022
- Volumes: 6
- Anime television series
- Directed by: Toshimasa Kuroyanagi
- Written by: Sawako Kawamitsu
- Music by: Daisuke Shinoda
- Studio: Cypic
- Licensed by: Sentai Filmworks: SA/SEA: Muse Communication
- Original network: Tokyo MX, BS Asahi, TVQ, SUN, KBS Kyoto, Mētele, HBC, Miyatele, RCC
- Original run: July 2, 2026 (Note: Episodes are released on Amazon Prime Video, HIDIVE and simulcast platforms by Muse 3 days before their televised airings.) – September 24, 2026
- Episodes: 13
- icon

The World Is Dancing (Japanese: ワールド イズ ダンシング, Hepburn: Wārudo Izu Danshingu) is a Japanese manga series written and illustrated by Kazuto Mihara. It was serialized in Kodansha's seinen manga magazine Morning from March 2021 to October 2022. An anime television series adaptation produced by Cypic aired from July to September 2026.

Set during the Muromachi period, the story follows Zeami Motokiyo (known in his youth as Oniyasha), a pivotal figure in the development of Noh drama.

== Plot ==
The story follows Oniyasha (the childhood name of Zeami) during the 14th century. In an era defined by political instability and social upheaval, Oniyasha struggles to find his own voice within his father Kan'ami's performance troupe. Rather than just following tradition, Oniyasha seeks to capture the "rhythm of the world" through dance. The series explores his journey of artistic awakening, his relationship with the Shogun Ashikaga Yoshimitsu, and the philosophical evolution of Noh theater.

== Characters ==
Oniyasha (鬼夜叉 役) / Zeami Motokiyo (世阿弥 元清)
Voiced by: Yumiri Hanamori (childhood), Nobunaga Shimazaki (young adult) (Japanese); Melissa Molano (English)
The protagonist, a young prodigy obsessed with finding a new way to express human emotion through movement.
Kan'ami (観阿弥)
Voiced by: Katsuyuki Konishi (Japanese); Joe Daniels (English)
Oniyasha's father and the leader of the Sarugaku Kanze troupe. He is a master of his craft but represents the traditional standards Oniyasha seeks to expand.
Ashikaga Yoshimitsu (足利 義満)
Voiced by: Takahiro Sakurai (Japanese); Brandon Hearnsberger (English)
The young, powerful Shogun who becomes a patron of the arts and takes a special interest in Oniyasha's talent.
Ishiya (石也)
Voiced by: Shimba Tsuchiya (Japanese); Tyler Galindo (English)
A kind-hearted member of the Kanze troupe who does not perform onstage due to a leg condition though is skilled at chanting. He is one of Oniyasha's closest friends and often helps him with his practice.
Kogane (コガネ)
Voiced by: Maaya Uchida (Japanese); Nickolette Kong (English)
A dependable boy who spends time with his friend Oniyasha outside of practice. Although rough around the edges, he holds an interest in dance, as it is later revealed that he was a former member of the Shinza troupe.
Zojiro (増次郎)
Voiced by: Romi Park
The strict, young leader of the Dengaku Shinza troupe serving as the driving force behind the troupe's morale. He is also critical towards Oniyasha.
Junigoro (十二五郎)
Voiced by: Haruki Ishiya (Japanese); Stephen Alcalá (English)
A serious and well-mannered member of the Kanze troupe who is skilled with the kotsuzumi.
Inuo (犬王)
Voiced by: Yōji Matsuda (Japanese); Scott Gibbs (English)
A mysterious white-haired man who indirectly influences Oniyasha through words from time to time.
Nijo Yoshimoto (二条 良基)
Voiced by: Nobuo Tobita
A court noble and regent who has an interest in poetry. He is captivated by Oniyasha's talent and calls himself his devoted follower.
Nariko (業子)
Voiced by: Mamiko Noto
Yoshimitsu's gentle wife who loves the performing arts and enjoys composing waka.
Chiharu (千晴)
Voiced by: Inori Minase
A girl and member of the Shinza troupe who deeply admires Nariko and participates in flute practice as an alternative to dance.
Satsuki (サツキ)
Voiced by: Hazuki Seto (Japanese); Shelby Blocker (English)
A straightforward one-armed girl who devotes herself in her work at a dumpling shop.
Shirabyoshi (白拍子)
Voiced by: Miyuki Sawashiro (Japanese); Emily Neves (English)
A frail woman who begrudgingly works as a prostitute to survive.
Hosokawa Yoriyuki (細川頼之)
Voiced by: Kenichirou Matsuda (Japanese); Ty Mahany (English)
A deputy of the shogunate and advisor to Yoshimitsu. He has extensive knowledge of the performing arts.
Chōrō (長老)
Voiced by: Katsuhisa Hōki
An elderly member of the Kanze troupe.
Samanosuke (左馬助)
Voiced by: Haruo Yamagishi (Japanese); Mike Yager (English)
A member of the Kanze troupe and Junigoro's mentor.
Mantarō (万太郎)
Voiced by: Sōshirō Hori (Japanese); Justin Doran (English)
A member of the Kanze troupe.
Senri (千里)
Voiced by: Kōsuke Echigoya (Japanese); Jeremy Gee (English)
A member of the Kanze troupe.
Toshigo (トシゴ)
Voiced by: Kaito Udagawa (Japanese); Chaney Moore (English)
A young apprentice of the Kanze troupe and a peer of Ishiya and Junigoro.
Hifumi (ひふみ)
Voiced by: Reiō Tsuchida (Japanese); Rex Rosario (English)
Another young apprentice of the Kanze troupe and a peer of Ishiya and Junigoro.

== Media ==
=== Manga ===
Written and illustrated by Kazuto Mihara, The World Is Dancing was serialized in Kodansha's seinen manga magazine Morning from March 25, 2021, to October 27, 2022. The series was collected in six tankōbon volumes released from August 23, 2021, to November 22, 2022. The manga is licensed for English-language release in North America by Kodansha USA, which published the series digitally from August 1, 2023, to August 27, 2024.

==== Volumes ====
No.	Original release date	Original ISBN	North American release date	North American ISBN
1	August 23, 2021	978-4-06-524505-7	August 1, 2023	979-8-88933-054-7
2	October 21, 2021	978-4-06-525171-3	October 3, 2023	979-8-88933-055-4
3	January 21, 2022	978-4-06-526566-6	December 5, 2023	979-8-88933-057-8
4	April 21, 2022	978-4-06-527422-4	February 6, 2024	979-8-88933-058-5
5	August 23, 2022	978-4-06-528872-6	April 2, 2024	979-8-88933-059-2
6	November 22, 2022	978-4-06-529816-9	August 27, 2024	979-8-88933-203-9

=== Anime ===
An anime television series adaptation was announced on January 21, 2026. It is produced by Cypic and directed by Toshimasa Kuroyanagi, with Shūhei Fuchimoto as assistant director, Sawako Kawamitsu supervising the scripts, Keigo Sasaki and Iori Hisatake designing the characters, Daisuke Shinoda composing the music, Tsumura Reijiro handling Noh choreography, Kohei Kawaguchi handling Noh supervision, and Satoshi Nemoto handling the calligraphy and title lettering. The series aired from July 2 to September 24, 2026, on Tokyo MX and other networks. The opening theme song is "Shusho" (終宵), performed by Macaroni Empitsu, while the ending theme song is "Namonai Hana" (名もない花; 'Unnamed Flower'), performed by hockrockb. Sentai Filmworks licensed the series in North America for streaming on Hidive. Muse Communication licensed the series in South and Southeast Asia.

==== Episodes ====
No.	Title	Directed by	Storyboarded by	Original release date
1	"Why Do People Dance?"; Transliteration: "Hito wa Naze Mau no ka" (Japanese: 人はなぜ舞うのか)	Naru Hosoma	Toshimasa Kuroyanagi	July 2, 2026
In 1374, amidst an ongoing civil war, Oniyasha wonders on the appeal and significance of dance to humans while participating in a performance led by his father and Kanze troupe leader Kan'ami. Oniyasha jeopardizes the performance, frustrating Kan'ami in his mission to preserve Sarugaku with their troupe. Oniyasha confides in Ishiya on his dismay towards Kan'ami chastising his inability to dance. When Oniyasha asks about its appeal, Ishiya remarks that dance incites change and hope based on his observations of Kan'ami's form. Oniyasha later sneaks out of practice to play with Kogane. Kogane shares on the starving villagers using dance to cope with their suffering, leaving Oniyasha further conflicted. While returning home, he encounters a mysterious white-haired man named Inuo, who points him to a frail shirabyoshi emotionally dancing. Oniyasha is left stunned and entranced by her abstract free-flowing performance, leaving him with a desire to better understand dance.
2	"You Have a Body"; Transliteration: "Anta ni wa Shintai ga aru Janai ka" (Japanese: あんたには身体があるじゃないか)	Shūhei Fuchimoto	Toshimasa Kuroyanagi	July 9, 2026
Wanting to learn more about the form in dance, Oniyasha seeks the shirabyoshi for her guidance. The shirabyoshi is left surprised by Oniyasha's eagerness to learn her form, though he feels that her dance is lacking. Oniyasha asks on what makes a dance good, adding he has no talent for it. The shirabyoshi states that Oniyasha has a body capable of dancing before ranting on her destitution and using them to perform an emotional dance. Oniyasha emulates the shirabyoshi's form into his dance, and Kan'ami commends him. Oniyasha and Ishiya head out to thank the shirabyoshi, but Oniyasha discovers that Kan'ami paid her. Oniyasha furiously confronts Kan'ami about the payment, though the latter asserts the shirabyoshi's art must be compensated and locks up Oniyasha. Oniyasha escapes with Ishiya and Kogane's help to find that the shirabyoshi died in poverty. Oniyasha tearfully lays her body to rest and recalls her final wish of performing for the shogunate. He performs a dance to honor her and joins the starving villagers in their dance.
3	"You Have Your Own Sense of "Good""; Transliteration: "Kimi ni wa Kimi no Yo sa ga Aru" (Japanese: 君には君のよさがある)	Mitsuki Kitamura	Seishirō Nagaya	July 16, 2026
Oniyasha performs a dance for the village and is determined to continue practicing, though Kanze troupe member Junigoro is skeptical. The Kanze troupe moves to Imakumano Shrine where Kan'ami announces Oniyasha will perform an important dance in the Okina, knowing that the shogun Ashikaga Yoshimitsu is in attendance. Oniyasha struggles with the task, disappointing Kan'ami. Oniyasha sneaks out and sees Inuo again, who suggests he follow his own path. The man points him to a rice planting ritual simulating sex, where Oniyasha meets an eccentric man explaining its purpose, not knowing he is Yoshimitsu. Oniyasha gains inspiration and returns to Imakumano, but he is reprimanded by a furious Junigoro for his lack of motivation and disobedience. Samanosuke calms him down and Junigoro reminisces on his suffering as a war orphan before being adopted by the Kanze troupe. Oniyasha, recalling Inuo's words, resolves to create his own form of dance.
4	"Differing Scales of Progress"; Transliteration: "Unbi no Ōki-sa wa Chigaedo" (Japanese: 運ビの大きさは違えど)	Naru Hosoma	Toshimasa Kuroyanagi	July 23, 2026
Oniyasha continues to worry for his part in the Okina. He confides in the Kanze troupe's elder on his anxieties. The elder tells him to dance with all his knowledge, adding that Kan'ami created his form by taking inspiration from the various dances he saw. At the Okina, Oniyasha determines his own limits and dances gracefully. He also witnesses Kan'ami's form, as the Kanze troupe is granted an audience with Yoshimitsu. Oniyasha recognizes him from their prior encounter, but Yoshimitsu reminds him of his authority before praising the troupe's performance. He then asks for Oniyasha's presence at his home, where Yoshimitsu admits that there can be more to the troupe's dance. Yoshimitsu senses Oniyasha's potential in bringing harmony to a fractured world through his dance and requests he stay with him. Oniyasha shares to Kan'ami on gaining a better appreciation of dance, while relaying Yoshimitsu's offer. Kan'ami tells Oniyasha to use the versatility offered by Sarugaku to create his own form and herald in a new era.
5	"A Budding Throb"; Transliteration: "Moederu Kodō" (Japanese: 萌え出る鼓動)	Shūhei Fuchimoto	Shūhei Fuchimoto	July 30, 2026
Oniyasha stays with Yoshimitsu at his residence, which is also accommodating the Dengaku Shinza troupe. Oniyasha is dimayed at the Shinza troupe looking down on him. He practices with Ishiya, during which Yoshimitsu's wife Nariko suggests implementing the art of poetry to his dance and gifts him a comb. One of the Shinza troupe's members, Chiharu, grows jealous of Oniyasha and sneaks into his living quarters. She accidentally breaks Nariko's comb, resulting in Oniyasha and the Shinza troupe having a fight. Yoshimitsu mediates by holding a lion dance competition, and the Shinza troupe uses it to prove Sarugaku having no place in dance. Feeling guilty for the situation, Chiharu helps Oniyasha, as he immerses himself as a cat to develop his dance. At the competition, Oniyasha instead performs a catlike dance which amuses the judges and audience, but loses to Shinza troupe member Zojiro. Zojiro flatly questions him on who he was dancing for and his purpose for straying away from the lion dance. A stunned Oniyasha is left to wonder if his form of dance can prevail over established tradition, while Chiharu remains moved by his dance.
6	"Connection"; Transliteration: "Musubitsuki" (Japanese: 結びつき)	Mika Tomiya	Fumiaki Kataoka	August 6, 2026
Despite the loss, Yoshimitsu's deputy Hosokawa Yoriyuki arranges for a rematch to give Oniyasha time to prepare. Yoshimitsu questions the decision as Yoriyuki and Nariko explain that the performing arts invite diverse opinions. Chiharu tries to understand Oniyasha's dance through his books, and Ishiya offers to teach Chiharu how to read. They also learn of the rematch's theme being a performance centered around Yoshimitsu. Elsewhere, Oniyasha begins to doubt his abilities for dancing when he reunites with an impoverished Kogane. Kogane reveals he was a former Shinza troupe member who was kicked out by Zojiro for failing to reach the troupe's expectations and being affiliated with the Southern Court. He lets Oniyasha stay with his group of refugees that includes a monk named Toku, who was secretly a former rebel. The two boys later encounter Inuo, who teaches Oniyasha harmony. Oniyasha is urged by Toku to cut ties with them and continue dancing to protect himself. He later watches in horror at Kogane and Toku being beaten by Ashikaga soldiers for their suspected ties to the Southern Court.
7	"In Between"; Transliteration: "Hazama nite" (Japanese: 狭間にて)	Yasuo Fujii	Toshimasa Kuroyanagi	August 13, 2026
Oniyasha is stopped by Yoshimitsu's aide Hijiri as the soldiers arrest Toku. Hijiri advises Oniyasha to not throw away his life after avoiding suspicion of having ties to the enemy. Kogane sneaks into Yoshimitsu's residence to free Toku, but Toku orders him to survive. Oniyasha watches Toku being tortured to death, with an anguished Kogane burying him afterwards. Later on, Oniyasha talks to Yoshimitsu on his disregard for the less fortunate as Yoshimitsu elaborates that he will be judging the upcoming rematch. Oniyasha sees the common people's plight and is reminded by Toku's last wishes of not wanting the defeated to be forgotten by history. He becomes determined to dance in their honor and asks Ishiya and a few hesitant members of the Shinza troupe to help him. On the day of the rematch, Oniyasha performs the Sotoba Komachi to directly call out Yoshimitsu's conduct. As the audience wonders on the next sequence, Oniyasha begins deviating from the play to the shock of Yoriyuki and Zojiro.
8	"To the Other Side of the Bridge"; Transliteration: "Hashi no Mukō e" (Japanese: 橋の向こうへ)	Kenji Takahashi	Kenji Takahashi	August 20, 2026
Channeling the shirabyoshi's teachings, Oniyasha performs an emotionally charged dance reminding Yoshimitsu of his role as shogun in caring for people from all walks of life. Yoshimitsu applauds Oniyasha's play, as Zojiro acknowledges his prowess and humbly admits defeat. Yoshimitsu prepares to punish Zojiro's insubordination, but Oniyasha negotiates on holding another round to repay the Shinza troupe. Oniyasha reflects on the performance while meeting with a disillusioned Kogane, who voices contempt at Oniyasha's lack of true understanding for their plight and severs their friendship. Yoshimitsu later tells Oniyasha that he will sponsor him and informs the next competition's theme being freeform. He also declares that he must defeat Zojiro, leaving Oniyasha reluctant. Meanwhile, Zojiro practices in his mission to preserve Dengaku, recalling how he failed to show his skills to his supportive mother before her death. Upon hearing the Shinza troupe's plans to ensure their survival by performing a Sarugaku dance titled Shiokumi and realizing the audience looks forward to a good performance, Zojiro and Oniyasha collaborate in their shared goal.
9	"Concealed Feelings"; Transliteration: "Himetaru Omoi" (Japanese: 秘めたる想い)	Shu Manzawa	Iku Suzuki	August 27, 2026
Oniyasha is briefed on Shiokumi needing two main performers and its reliance on narrative, as Zojiro and the Shinza troupe demonstrate it. Realizing the dance may not leave an impact to Yoshimitsu and the nobles, Oniyasha and Zojiro travel to a lake to gather research. An eccentric noble named Nijo Yoshimoto reveals himself as a fan of Oniyasha and senses his aimlessness. Yoshimoto recites a poem to motivate Oniyasha, allowing him to realize that Shiokumi is missing emotion and atmosphere. Oniyasha volunteers to add them to the dance using his readings, though Zojiro and the Shinza troupe are doubtful. After hearing Chiharu and Ishiya recite its poem, Oniyasha grows confident in successfully conveying the message and shares it to the Shinza troupe. Zojiro remains nervous in the art of Dengaku being lost to time, though he sets it aside to show support for Oniyasha's plan. Elsewhere, a destitute Kogane learns of the upcoming performance and dances emotionally.
10	"A World Overflowing"; Transliteration: "Afureta Sekai" (Japanese: 溢れた世界)	Naru Hosoma	Shūhei Fuchimoto	September 3, 2026
Yoshimitsu is shocked to see Oniyasha and Zojiro collaborating in his final competition. Yoshimitsu and the audience become fully immersed in their performance of Shiokumi, leaving them speechless at its beauty and serenity. Yoshimitsu applauds the two boys on developing a novel dance and ends the competition in a draw. Yoshimitsu is then suddenly stabbed by Kogane, who is subdued by his bodyguards. Oniyasha is devastated at Kogane's actions, as Kogane resigns himself to his inevitable death. Reflecting on the country's instability, Yoshimitsu sets out to bring change as shogun. Inuo later appears to inform Kan'ami of Oniyasha's journey as a performer before vanishing. Zojiro tells a sullen Oniyasha that he will depart and cease their collaboration, though he commends his ability to dance even with his shortcomings. Oniyasha is further driven to tears upon learning that Ishiya has retired as his aide, with Ishiya regretfully admitting he wanted to perform alongside him. Several years later, an isolated Oniyasha grows into a young man and entertains numerous nobles who have come to watch him perform.
11	"The Moon Before It's Full"; Transliteration: "Komochizuki" (Japanese: 小望月)	Yūki Yonemori	Yūki Yonemori	September 10, 2026
In the years since his meeting with Kan'ami, Inuo leads the Hiyoshi troupe to preserve Sarugaku. He is summoned by Yoshimitsu, who asks him to hold a commemorative performance for his new palace being built in Kyoto to restore faith in the shogunate. Meanwhile, Oniyasha grows numb to his dancing, worrying his peers. Yoshimoto senses his anxieties and reassures him that his time as a young adult naturally brings several changes. Hearing this, Oniyasha visits Inuo for advice on how he can maintain his craft in spite of his immense loneliness and being burdened by expectations. Oniyasha later watches Inuo and the Hiyoshi troupe perform at Yoshimitsu's residence. He becomes entranced by Inuo's gracefulness, causing him to woefully regard his own skills as lacking. Oniyasha desperately asks Inuo for his guidance, but Inuo voices dismay at Oniyasha's lack of self-confidence. Oniyasha faints due to dancing himself to exhaustion. He ruminates on giving up his craft, when he is brought back to reality by Junigoro.
12	"Reclaiming Intentions"; Transliteration: "Shoshin" (Japanese: 初心)	Toshimasa Kuroyanagi	Toshimasa Kuroyanagi	September 17, 2026
Yoshimoto questions Yoshimitsu on whether he can find outstanding talent for his upcoming performance, imploring him to have Oniyasha perform. Chiharu also convinces him to continue believing in Oniyasha's craft. Meanwhile, Oniyasha is nursed back to health at the Kanze troupe's training grounds with Ishiya helping him from afar. The troupe holds a party celebrating his return, as Kan'ami sees Ishiya downplaying his involvement in Oniyasha's growth as a performer. Kan'ami tells him that he has the freedom to decide his next aspiration. Oniyasha continues to observe the vast changes of his previous life, causing him to realize he is following in the shirabyoshi's footsteps. He then reunites with Ishiya after hearing him sing. Ishiya tearfully confesses on running away to not experience the pain of his past, sharing his desire to still perform alongside Oniyasha onstage. Oniyasha regains his passion for dance and announces his dream of making dance available to people from all walks of life. He begins intensely practicing when Yoshimitsu's aide Shinemon relays his request to have Oniyasha dance at the commemorative performance with Inuo.
13	"Noh"; Transliteration: "Nō" (Japanese: 能)	Yorihiro Tanimoto & Shūhei Fuchimoto	Toshimasa Kuroyanagi, Shūhei Fuchimoto, Yasuo Fujii, Iku Suzuki & Kei Oikawa	September 24, 2026
Oniyasha asks for Kan'ami's blessing in donning a mask to mark his transition into a true Sarugaku performer. Kan'ami, who has grown proud of his son's growth, grants his wish. A crowd forms at Yoshimitsu's residence to watch the performance, with Zojiro also in attendance. Inuo conducts a frenetic dance, enthralling the audience. Oniyasha, rechristened as Kanze Motokiyo, performs Kan'ami's most famous work titled Ji'nen Koji while also championing people like the impaired Ishiya and the feminine Chiharu as capable performers. Wanting the art of Sarugaku to persist beyond their lifetimes, Oniyasha dynamically molds it during the performance. He fully devotes his entire being into the work in spite of overworking his own body, stunning Inuo and the audience. Yoshimitsu respects Oniyasha's mission of captivating people with his dance, remarking it as strange and fun.
