= The Frolic of the Beasts =

1961 novel by Yukio Mishima

- First edition cover (Japan)
- Author: Yukio Mishima
- Original title: 獣の戯れ (Kemono no Tawamure)
- Translator: Andrew Clare
- Cover artist: Kaii Higashiyama
- Language: Japanese
- Set in: Iro and Tokyo
- Published: 12 June 1961–4 September 1961 in Shukan Shincho
- Publisher: Shinchosha
- Publication date: 30 September 1961
- Publication place: Japan
- English publication date: 27 November 2018
- Media type: Print (hardcover)
- Pages: 207
- OCLC: 673928594
- Dewey Decimal: 895.63/5
- LC Class: PL833.I7 K4

The Frolic of the Beasts (Japanese: 獣の戯れ, Hepburn: Kemono no Tawamure) is a 1961 novel by Yukio Mishima. It is considered a minor work from Mishima's middle period. Drawing inspiration from Noh plays, specifically the 14th-century Motomezuka, the novel centers on a tragic love triangle depraved by adultery and violence. It is a short novel in length and has a nonlinear narrative structure. The novel was first serialised in thirteen parts in the weekly magazine Shukan Shincho between 12 June 1961 and 4 September 1961. It was published in hardcover format by Shinchosha on 30 September 1961. It was published in paperback by Shincho Bunko on 10 July 1966. The novel was translated into Italian by Lydia Origlia and published by Feltrinelli in September 1983. The novel was translated into English by Andrew Clare and published in paperback in the United States and Canada by Vintage International on 27 November 2018. Clare's translation was later published in paperback in the United Kingdom by Penguin Modern Classics on 4 April 2019. The English translation was re-released in the United Kingdom on 2 November 2023 as part of Penguin's Japanese Classics series.

In 1964 the novel was adapted by Sōkichi Tomimoto as a film starring Ayako Wakao.

== Background ==
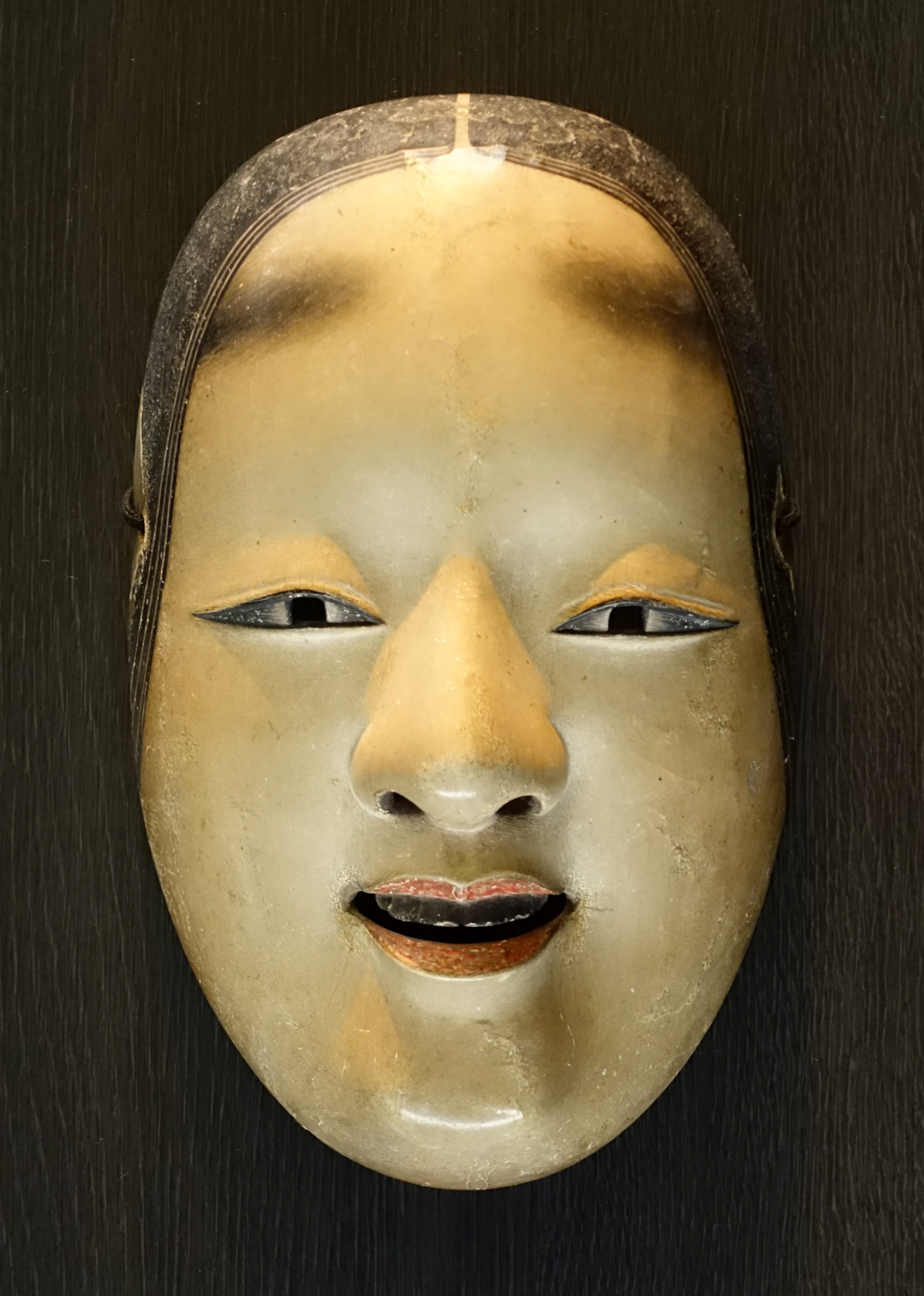
A smiling Nō mask, mirroring the "interminable smile" of Ippei

The Frolic of the Beasts is a parody of the classical Noh play Motomezuka, written in the fourteenth century by the father of modern Noh theatre, Kiyotsugu Kan'ami. In the play, a priest from the western provinces, travelling to Kyoto, stops with his companions in the isolated village of Ikuta ("Field of Life") in Settsu Province. They meet a group of village girls who tell them the story of Unai. In the story, two men, Sasada and Chinu, declare their love for Unai. Unwilling to incur the jealousy of one by favouring the other, Unai declined to make a choice. Her parents make the two suitors compete for her hand, but each contest results in a draw. In torment, Unai drowns herself in Ikuta River. After her funeral, Sasada and Chinu were inconsolable, and they commit suicide by stabbing each other to death. Unai's ghost bears the karmic responsibility for their demise. The priest intones prayers for her soul. She hears the prayers, but they are of no avail; she is unable to escape from the Burning House (a Buddhist metaphor for the secular world) and the Eight Great Hells, through which she is eternally tormented by her demons. In another version of the story, Unai is depicted as being pulled in different directions by the deceased lovers in a metaphorical tug of war. There is a clear allusion to Yūko's relationship with Ippei and Kōji. The love triangle among Unai, Sasada, and Chinu corresponds to that of The Frolic of the Beasts with Yūko, Ippei, and Kōji, as well as in Kiyoshi's and Matsukichi's quarrel over Kimi's love. It is interesting to note that in the traditional Noh theatre, immorality was always regarded as a sin which would lead to eternal damnation in the fires of hell (echoing Unai's fate in Motomezuka and Yūko's anguish in prison).

The name Motomezuka is likely to be a corruption of Otomezuka (the "Maiden's Grave"), the original story being contained in an episode of the Yamato Monogatari, a tale combining narrative fiction with waka poetry from the mid-tenth century. The earliest references to the story appear in poem form in the Manyōshū, the oldest and greatest anthology of Japanese poems, compiled during the late Nara period.

Noh theatre performances are characterised by their use of meticulously designed masks that represent specific characters and facial expressions. Noh masks are referenced throughout The Frolic of the Beasts. At the beginning of the novel's first chapter, Kōji humours himself with the thought that his own face "is like a well-crafted, carved wooden mask." In the novel's prologue, Ippei's expression is described as an "interminable smile", which recalls the fixed expression of Noh masks. Also, the "dark grape luster" of Yūko's "characteristic thick lipstick" is likely a direct reference to the archetypal "young woman" (Wakaonna) character portrayed in Noh productions. In his review for The Japan Times, Damian Flanagan also compared the "jumbled" nature of the novel's nonlinear narrative as creating a "transcendent unearthliness" similar to that of a Noh play.

Miyoko Tanaka, the commentator in the original Shinchosha paperback edition of the novel says that both in the form of the story, which is "like a dream rising from weed-infested ruins," and from the descriptions of the faces of the characters, "we Japanese clearly recognize vestiges of the traditional Noh theater performance."

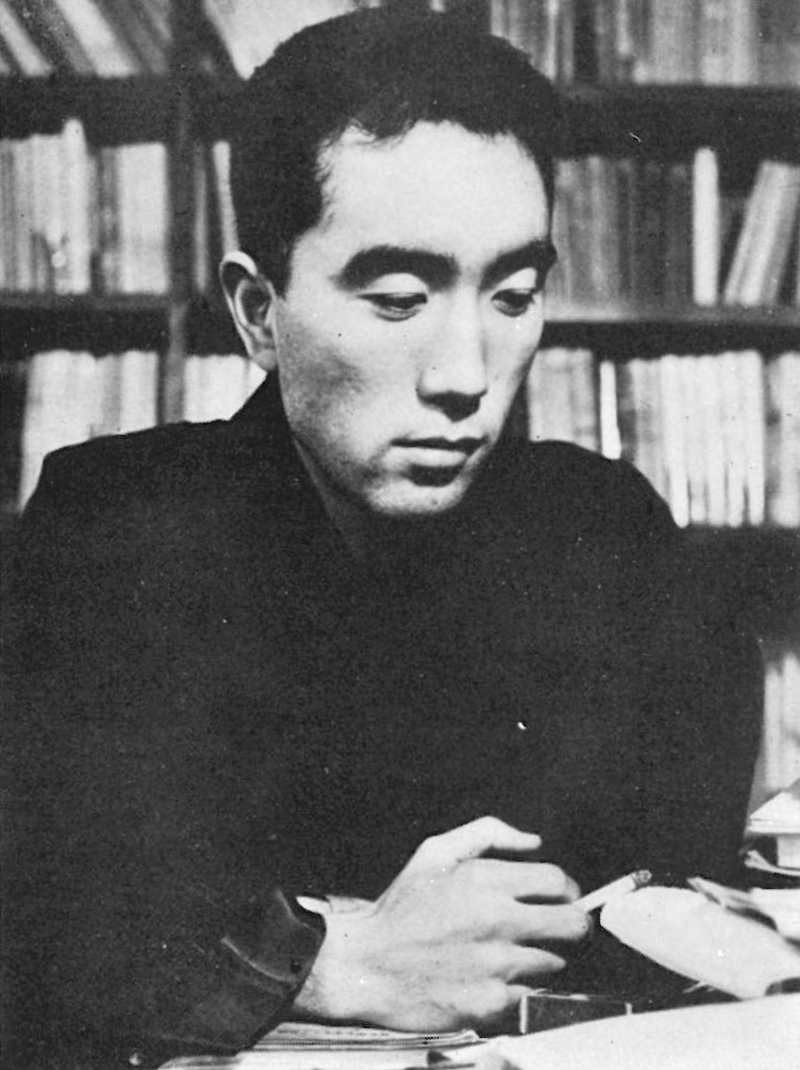
Mishima was infatuated with the Noh theater and wrote several Noh plays himself.

Mishima was infatuated with the Noh theater and he wrote several Noh plays himself (adapted from ancient Noh performances). All of his plays were performed in Japan and some of them in other cities around the world, including New York. There is some speculation that Mishima was partly influenced in his choice of subject matter by the theme of Noh masks running through Fumiko Enchi's novel, Masks. It seems certain that Mishima rated Enchi highly and described this book as an "esoteric masterpiece." Enchi's novel was published in 1958, three years before The Frolic of the Beasts.

The story is considered to be a variation on the theme of Mishima's stream of consciousness novel, Thirst for Love (1950), in that it portrays a dysfunctional family unit, whose members have been thrown together with ultimately tragic consequences. The Frolic of the Beasts has also been compared to Mishima's novel Forbidden Colors (1951, 1953), which portrays the messy relationship between the much-older Shunsuke and the youthful Yuichi. It has also been compared to the intense existential crises of the characters in Mishima's 1959 novel Kyōko no Ie (鏡子の家).

== Plot ==
=== Prologue ===
In a photograph, three smiling individuals–Ippei Kusakado, his wife Yūko, and the youthful Kōji–are seen standing on the harbor wall in Iro Village, a rural fishing port in the western part of the Izu Peninsula in Shizuoka Prefecture. The photograph was taken on a hot summer day. It was taken only days before "the final wretched incident". It was immediately sent to the chief priest of Taisenji temple. In Iro, there are also rice paddies as well as the Kusakado greenhouses, located beside the Kusakado family home. On the mountainside lies a new graveyard, reaching halfway up the slope of the mountain from its base. In spite of opposition from the villagers, the chief priest of Taisenji temple erected the new graves with the money that was entrusted to him. Ippei's grave lies on the right, Kōji's on the left, and Yūko's in the center. Yūko's, however, is only a "living monument", reserved for her eventual death.

=== Chapter 1 ===
Kōji is released from prison. He travels by boat from Numazu to Iro Village, where Yūko is waiting for him. Kōji tells himself that he has repented and is a different person, but once he arrives he is immediately told by Yūko that he hasn't changed. Yūko had become his guarantor upon his release, but they both question whether they have made a mistake in Kōji coming to Iro. Yūko closed the Tokyo shop a year ago, moved to Iro, and started the Kusakado greenhouse, which Kōji will work in. The two of them walk through Iro to the Kusakado house. Greeted by villagers on the way, Kōji is ashamed knowing rumours of his past will spread but Yūko tells him to keep his head up. Kōji is seized by fear when he sees Ippei in front of the gate of the house.

=== Chapter 2 ===
Two years earlier, when he was a 21-year-old university student, Kōji was hired to work at a Western ceramics shop in Ginza, Tokyo. Ippei Kusakado, a 40-year-old man, is the owner and manager of the ceramics shop but also translates and reviews German literature in his spare time. While drinking together at a bar, Ippei tells Kōji about his unhappiness with his wife Yūko's lack of jealousy. He says he has tried everything to make her jealous, confessing to his numerous affairs. Kōji, jealous of Ippei's "corrupt heart", falls in love with Yūko that night, despite not having met her before. Kōji begins a secret affair with Yūko. One night, Yūko told Kōji that she knows Ippei has been adulterous, showing him documentation from a private investigator who tracked his infidelity. She cried, but told Kōji not to tell her husband of her suffering. On a summer's day, six months after he first met Yūko, Kōji is waiting for Yūko outside a hospital. He spots a black wrench lying on the ground and puts it in his jacket pocket. Much later while in prison, Kōji reflected on the wrench, viewing it as a manifestation of "will" that had become a material phenomen which sought to "upset the very foundations" of the order of his world. That evening, Yūko and Kōji walk in on Ippei and find him with a lover, Machiko. Yūko simply asks Ippei to "return home quietly". Kōji expected a grand confrontation, where "the truth of perverse human nature begins to shine". He instead sees it as "nothing other than things he had grown utterly tired of seeing: the mediocre concealment of human shame, the irony of keeping up appearances." Yūko, crying and jabbering, is struck across the cheek twice by Ippei. Kōji immediately reacts without "emotion, objective, or motive", and repeatedly bashes the left side of Ippei's head with the wrench he had placed in the pocket of his jacket.

=== Chapter 3 ===
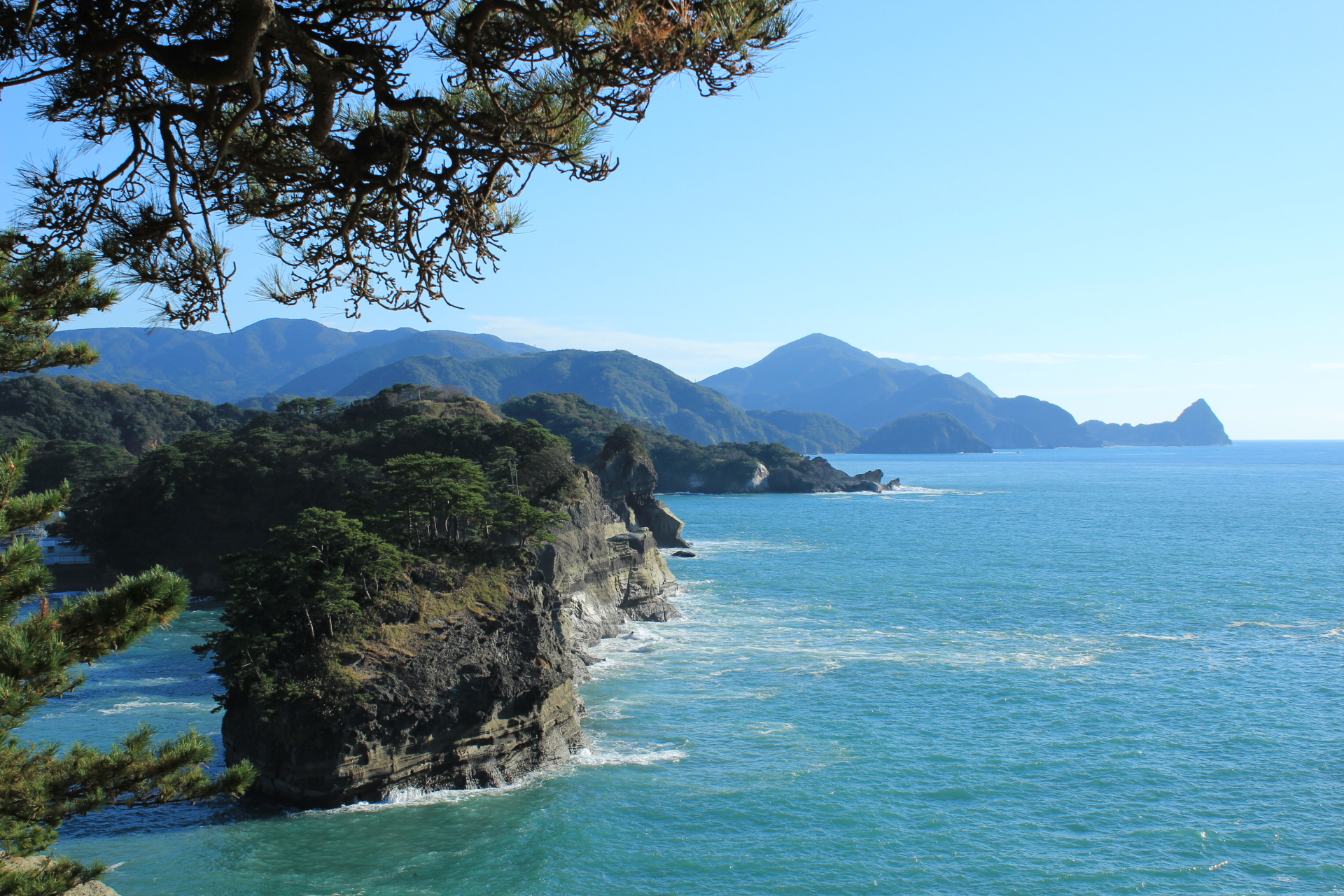
Izu coastline in Nishiizu

In Iro, Kōji meets Ippei for the first time since he was imprisoned. Kōji's assault leaves Ippei with a fractured cranium and a cerebral contusion. Ippei is diagnosed with aphasia and paralysis on his right side, and is left with an "interminable smile". Kōji explains his assault as driven by an extreme unease with enduring that "world bereft of logic", and chose to impart the "cold, hard, black logic of iron" of the wrench. Kōji works in the Kusakado greenhouse with fellow gardener Teijiro. One day, Kōji, Yūko and Ippei go for a picnic at the nearby waterfall and greet Kakujin, the priest of Taisenji temple, on the way. They stop at the village shrine to make a peace offering with a lily, but Yūko is unimpressed with the shrine's appearance and size. Yūko's sacrilege scares Kōji. Yūko suddenly begins to taunt Ippei, asking him if he understands "sacrifice". Ippei replies that he does not understand and Kōji tries to defend him but Yūko cuts Kōji off and calls Ippei an idiot. Yūko throws the lily into the plunge pool, and Ippei's face displays "a look of pure anxiety born of being cut off from all understanding". She asks Ippei if he understands the word "kiss", then passionately kisses Kōji in front of him. Kōji scolds Yūko for using him for Ippei's sake. She answers, asserting she has used Kōji from the beginning and that he surely likes it. Kōji strikes Yūko across the cheek and turns to Ippei, who has a fixed smile on his face. Terrified, Kōji embraces Yūko to erase the fear from his mind, but her kiss "had lost completely its exquisite taste".

=== Chapter 4 ===
One evening, Kōji is drinking alone at the Storm Petrel, the only bar in Iro Village. He gossips with the bar's owner about Teijirō's young daughter, Kimi. Kōji has never heard Teijirō speak about Kimi, and senses that there are ill feelings between them. After Kimi's mother died, they had lived together until Kimi suddenly left for Hamamatsu to become a factory girl. Kimi has not interacted with Teijirō since returning to Iro for a ten-day vacation from her work at the Imperial Instruments factory in Hamamatsu. Kimi is strikingly beautiful and makes the village girls of Iro jealous by her presence. She carries a ukulele with her wherever she goes. At around 9:00 p.m., Kimi, Matsukichi, and Kiyoshi enter the bar and Kōji joins them at their table. Matsukichi is a fisherman and Kiyoshi is a member of the Japan Air Self-Defense Force ground crew. They are both Kimi's childhood friends, and have quarrelled with each other over her love ever since. Kōji envies Kiyoshi's "simple lyrical spirit", but considers Matsukichi "a dull-witted young animal". Looking at the three characters, Kōji thinks of Yūko, who has not permitted him to kiss her since the incident during the picnic. He realises the depth of his love for Yūko and repeats "I have repented" to himself. Together in the bar, Kōji, Kimi, Matsukichi, and Kiyoshi all get drunk and Kimi offers up her ukulele, swearing that whichever of the young men gets it will be the one who gets her love. Interested, they all leave in a small boat and travel to Urayasu where they go nude swimming. They walk into Urayasu forest and start a bonfire, where Kimi refuses to give up her ukulele. Matsukichi steals the instrument from Kimi, then passes it to Kiyoshi. The two men pass it back and forth to each other as Kimi attempts to take it back. Matsukichi and Kiyoshi take the ukulele and jump into the boat together, rowing into the bay by themselves. Kōji and Kimi return to the forest bonfire. Kimi says she purposely did not swim after the boat because she wished be alone with Kōji. Kimi says she respects Kōji's love for Yūko, but is "prepared to make a sacrifice and act as a stand-in". Kōji and Kimi have sex, but Kōji cannot suppress the thought that the experience is "nothing but a poor imitation" of the "perfect flesh" that he created and refined with his imagination while in prison. They swim across the bay and return home. Several days later, Kōji hears rumours that Kiyoshi kept the ukulele, carrying it around wherever he went to the envy of the other young men in the village. That night, after drinking at the bar, Matsukichi confesses to Kōji that he and Kiyoshi made a secret pact. Kiyoshi only cared about his reputation, and agreed to never lay a hand on Kimi. The night after they went to Urayasu, Kimi gave herself to Matsukichi. When Matsukichi told Kimi of their pact, she laughed but accepted his proposal nonetheless. Kōji is surprised that Matsukichi has no inkling that he and Kimi had sex while alone on the island together.

=== Chapter 5 ===
While working in the greenhouse, Teijirō suddenly confesses to Kōji that he raped Kimi. Teijirō then shows Kōji a pornographic photograph of a boy in a student's uniform having sex with a girl in a sailor uniform, and remarks that the girl has a similar appearance to that of Kimi. Kōji is disturbed by Teijirō's unsolicited confession, and questions what the purpose of his confession was. Kimi stops by the Kusakado house to say goodbye before leaving to return to the factory in Hamamatsu. Looking at her, Kōji theorises that Kimi had slept with him and persuaded Matsukichi to love her only in order to infect them with the "germ-like secret of her father's crime" without letting them know her truth. He imagines she was quietly picturing "the origin of her burning, rejuvenating humiliation and self-loathing" while they had sex. Kimi says goodbye and squeezes Kōji's hands, gazing in his eyes. Kōji stares only at Yūko, who takes out a hairpin from her hair and pricks the back of Kimi's hand. Kimi leaves, running down the slope laughing maniacally, while Yūko turns away with a frown on her face. In the heat of that night, Kōji is lying on his bed while covered by a mosquito net. Yūko enters Kōji's room and tells him she stuck her hairpin in the hand of the "conceited" Kimi to warn her, not out of jealously. Yūko compares her action to that of Kōji with the wrench, and reveals that she is jealous of Koji's crime. She is jealous of "not having a crime to her name" that would allow her to at least "stand beside him". Kōji and Yūko passionately embrace between the mosquito net, but Yūko sees a figure outside and loudly screams that her husband is approaching. Kōji realises Yūko wishes to be caught by Ippei, that it would liberate her from her "long-continued suffering". He is infuriated by Yūko and refuses to let her through the mosquito net, not wanting to be caught by Ippei in an adulterous position with Yūko. Ippei climbs the stairs and tells Yūko he wants to sleep there because it is cool. Several days later, after a typhoon passes and misses West Izu, Kōji speaks with Kakujin the priest at Taisenji temple. He sees Yūko and Ippei coming down the slope, and Yūko asks Kōji to accompany Ippei on his daily walk. Kōji decides to confront Ippei on their walk, vehemently questioning him and accusing him of elaborately tormenting Yūko and him under the guise of his mental incapacity. He calls him a "hollow cavern" and "empty hole" which the household revolves around. Kōji asks Ippei what he wants, to which Ippei responds he wishes to go home. Kōji is angered by this "childlike supplication" and further presses Ippei, asking him what he really wants. Ippei responds, "Death. I want to die." They meet back up with Yūko, and Kōji tells her that he feels his life is being lived solely for Ippei's sake. There is a tacit understanding between them, and Yūko says, "There's no going back now after all of this." The three of them arrive at the harbor, and Yūko says they should travel to the other side of the bay one day. She suggests Teijirō take them over in the boat in the middle of the day and that they should take "lots of pictures".

=== Epilogue ===
On a summer vacation, a folklore researcher travels to Iro and speaks with a priest, Kakujin, who recounts his memories of Ippei, Yūko, and Kōji. Kakujin tells of the time Yūko and Kōji appeared at Taisenji temple, confessing to strangling Ippei to death. Kakujin shows the researcher the photo described in the novel's prologue. It had been given to him the day before Ippei was murdered. Kōji testified that he murdered Ippei at Ippei's request, but Kōji's gifting of the photograph to the priest was used as indelible evidence of premeditated murder. Kōji was given the death penalty, and Yūko was sentenced to life imprisonment. While in prison, Yūko requested Kakujin to arrange their graves side by side, with Yūko in between. The researcher visits the graves, and takes a photograph. The priest asks the researcher to deliver the photograph on his behalf to Yūko in person. The researcher later travels to Tochigi prison and meets Yūko. Looking at the photograph, she thanks the researcher and says, "Now I can serve my time in peace." Yūko puts the photograph in her pocket and leaves.

== Setting ==
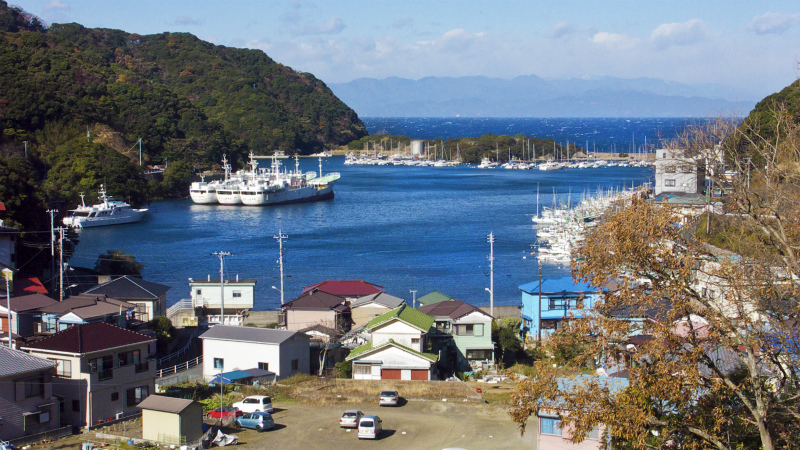
The harbor in Tago, Nishiizu, just south of present-day Arari

"Iro Village" is a fictional place set in the former fishing village of Arari, which was merged into the current town of Nishiizu. Similarly, a reference to Mt Taiya is also fictional. However, nearby Arari is a real mountain called "Ono-san" or "Ono-yama." The Japanese characters "Ono" can also be read "Taiya." Mishima stayed at a ryokan in Arari called the Horaiya and also visited the Air Self Defense Force base at nearby Hamamatsu while writing The Frolic of the Beasts (Mishima is known to have been assiduous with his on-site research). A monument to Mishima is located in the area of Cape Kogane overlooking Suruga Bay, with a passage from The Frolic of the Beasts engraved on it (with the original calligraphy being brushed by Mishima's father, Azusa Hiraoka).

== Title and covers ==
Before its official English translation, the novel's title was variously translated as Beastly Entanglements and The Amusement of Beasts.

The novel's first edition cover illustration was done by Kaii Higashiyama.

US Edition (Vintage International)

The cover was created by graphic designer John Gall. He selected it as being appropriate because the story largely takes place in a rural shore town and involves a love triangle, which invokes a rock garden and a burning element that is beginning to affect the larger whole. The cover was included on Literary Hub's list "The 75 Best Book Covers of 2018".

UK Edition (Penguin Modern Classics)

The cover design uses a photograph taken in the mid-1960s by Eikoh Hosoe, one of a series of photographs from a collection called Kamaitachi (a mythical weasel with sickle-like claws). The photo shoot took place in a remote farming village in the Tōhoku region of Japan and was a collaboration between Eikoh and Tatsumi Hijikata, the creator of the ankoku butō style of dance.

UK Edition (Penguin Japanese Classics)

The cover was designed by Jim Stoddart, Art Director of Penguin Books UK.

== Characters ==
- Kōji – a 21-year-old university student who is a "fun-loving, hotheaded youth". He has "regular and firm features" and a "somewhat oldfashioned warrior's face and relatively bony nose." He has no living parents, siblings, or relatives, and went to college on his parents' inheritance. He worked part-time at a Western ceramics shop in Ginza, managed by Ippei Kusakado, and fell in love with his wife.
- Ippei Kusakado – after graduating a German literature degree, he worked for a while as a lecturer at a private university, and then managed a Western ceramics store in Ginza, which he inherited from his parents. He is an art lover and has published translations and reviews of Hugo von Hofmannsthal and Stefan George, as well as a critical biography of Li He. His literary style is "exquisitely refined". He is a dandy who goes to a high-class hair salon and dresses in tailored suits, with Italian silk shirts and neckties.
- Yūko Kusakado – Ippei's wife. She has a round and "richly proportioned" face. She has "large, misty eyes, ample cheeks, soft earlobes" and thin lips adorned with thick lipstick. After Kōji's assault, she closed the ceramics shop in Ginza and became involved in horticulture, starting a greenhouse in Iro Village, Nishiizu.
- Machiko – a woman who was a mistress of Ippei. Ippei visited Machiko's apartment every Tuesday evening.
- Teijirō – the gardener hired in the Kusakado greenhouse. He is a muscular old man and a former fisherman. He has "firm, sun-weathered features" and "a closely cropped head of salt-white hair". He has a "youthful agility". His wife, Kimi's mother, has already died.
- Kimi – Teijirō's daughter. After her mother died, she was raped by her father. She suddenly left home, working as a factory girl at the Imperial Instruments factory in Hamamatsu. Kimi is beautiful and flaunts her beauty, making the village girls and ordinary locals consider her presence a nuisance. She carries around a ukulele, which she partly manufactured, wherever she goes.
- Matsukichi – a fisherman. He is "a dull-witted young animal". He is Kimi's childhood friend, and quarreled with Kiyoshi over her. He is "broad-shouldered, and his chest muscles bulged like a bank of summer clouds."
- Kiyoshi – a member of the Japan Air Self-Defense Force ground crew. He has a "bright, round face". He is Kimi's childhood friend, and quarrelled with Matsukichi over her. He has a "simple lyrical spirit". Along with Matsukichi and Kimi, he is a regular at the Storm Petrel, the only bar in Iro Village.
- Kakujin – the priest of Taisenji temple in Iro. He is bald and has a round face with a "shiny, ruddy complexion" and "affable, small, narrow eyes". He thirsts after people's suffering and has the spiritual ability to see one's true nature, and immediately detects Yūko's hidden anguish when she first arrived in Iro. He used the money entrusted to him by Yūko and erected the graves of Ippei, Yūko and Kōji, with their gravestones located side by side in a shallow depression in the hillside in Iro.
- I – Unnamed first-person narrator of the epilogue. He is a high school teacher and folklore researcher. On a summer vacation, he goes on a trip to the Izu Peninsula and visits Iro. He speaks with Kakujin, who tells him Ippei, Yūko, and Kōji's story, and subsequently travels to visit Yūko in Tochigi prison. He represents the lyrical itinerant priest in a Noh play, who goes on a journey (here appearing in the Epilogue, in contrast to the traveler priest who would typically make an appearance at the beginning of a Noh play) and Kakujin plays the role of the Noh reciter and provides an outline of the story for the benefit of the main supporting character (i.e. the researcher) and the audience.

== Publication ==
The Frolic of the Beasts was first serialised thirteen times in the weekly magazine Shukan Shincho between 12 June 1961 and 4 September 1961. It was published in hardcover format by Shinchosha on 30 September 1961. It was published in paperback by Shincho Bunko on 12 July 1966. The novel was translated into Italian by Lydia Origlia and published by Feltrinelli in September 1983. The novel was translated into English by Andrew Clare and published in paperback format in the United States and Canada by Vintage International on 27 November 2018. Clare's translation was later published in paperback in the United Kingdom by Penguin Modern Classics on 4 April 2019.

== Reception ==
The Frolic of the Beasts is considered a minor work from Mishima's middle period. However, some writers are now arguing for its heightened status.

=== Contemporary ===
The novel received a positive reception from contemporary Japanese literary critics. Its publication in 1961 coincided the public debate over the "pure literature controversy" (Junbungaku Ronsō (純文学論争)), which was started by literary critic Hirano Ken with a September 1961 article he wrote in The Asahi Shimbun. The Frolic of the Beasts was positively evaluated as a legitimate work of "pure literature" at the time.

In the 16 October 1961 issue of The Nihon Keizai Shimbun, eminent writer and scholar Shōichi Saeki called the novel an authentic literary depiction of love. In the 8 November 1961 issue of the Tokyo Shimbun's evening edition, critic Takeshi Muramatsu praised the novel and contrasted it to the detective crime fiction of writer Seichō Matsumoto, whose work Muramatsu said in contrast to that of Mishima could not be considered "pure literature". In the 10 August 1962 issue of Chitsujo (秩序), Hidehiko Miwa characterized it a neo-romantic novel. In the 30 October 1961 issue of the weekly book review paper Shūkan Dokushojin, Sumie Tanaka described the novel as a work of fierce research. In the 2 November 1961 issue of the Yomiuri Shimbun's evening edition, critic Okuno Takeo felt, however, that the second part of the novel was written in such a dense and beautiful style that it prevented the overall work from leaving a deep impression.

=== Translation ===
The novel's English translation, written by Andrew Clare and first published in 2018, received favourable reviews from literary critics.

Publishers Weekly, in its starred review, called it a "luridly propulsive novel" and praised Mishima's "baroque, beautiful prose". Sam Sacks of The Wall Street Journal called it a "morose little gem" and wrote that the book's influences "aren't integrated so much as piled on top of each other, like a face gaudily layered in makeup. It's a train wreck of styles, but because the book is about moral catastrophe the collision seems fitting." John Nathan, a well-known translator and biographer of Mishima, who knew Mishima personally, praised Andrew Clare's "decent" translation in his review of the novel for The New York Review of Books.

Andrew Ervin of The Washington Post wrote that the novel's nonlinear timeline "pays huge dividends" and "powerful epilogue ties a neat ribbon around the plot." Ervin, however, noted that the book seems dated for contemporary readers, with its "excessive and repetitive attention to the breast size of every female character." In her review for Spectrum Culture, Ashley Pabilonia felt the first half of the novel suffered from its nonlinear timeline, but praised Mishima for building the characters' "romantic tension, suspense and guilt between them thickly enough that readers will be enticed to see the trio's story to the end." Writing for The New York Times Book Review, John Williams criticised the plot for not sustaining the novel's length, but praised the unconventional relationships of the central characters for making the "most riveting scenes" of the novel "truly riveting; unforgettable, even."

Interviewed in the Chicago Review of Books, author Maryse Meijer said that The Frolic of the Beasts is "the kind of book you scribble all over in excitement because every line is so brilliant."

The English-language translation was included as an honorable mention on Literary Hub's list "The 10 Best Translated Novels of the Decade" for the 2010s.

== Film adaptation ==
Kemono no Tawamure 獣の戯れ
- Japanese film poster
- Directed by: Sōkichi Tomimoto
- Screenplay by: Kazuo Funahashi
- Based on: The Frolic of the Beasts by Yukio Mishima
- Starring: Ayako Wakao; Seizaburō Kawazu; Takao Ito
- Cinematography: Nobuo Munekawa
- Music by: Yoshirō Irino
- Production company: Daiei
- Release date: 23 May 1964
- Running time: 94 minutes
- Country: Japan
- Language: Japanese

In 1964, the novel was adapted into a black-and-white film by director Sōkichi Tomimoto through Daiei Studios. The film stars Ayako Wakao, the leading actress of her day, as Yūko. Ayako Wakao previously starred alongside Mishima in the yakuza film Afraid to Die (1960).

Cast

- Ayako Wakao as Yūko Kusakado
- Seizaburō Kawazu as Ippei Kusakado
- Takao Ito as Kōji Umemiya
- Masao Mishima as Kakujin
- Hikaru Hoshi as Teijirō
- Yoshi Katō as Kibe, a chaplain
- Yuka Konno as Kimi
- Midori Towada as Machiko
- Kentarō Kudō as Matsukichi
- Daigo Inoue as Kiyoshi
- Shin Minatsu as Saburō
- Shizuo Chūjō as hospital doctor
- Yūzō Hayakawa as prison officer
- Sachiko Meguro as Hideko

Crew

- Hiroaki Fujii – planning
- Shigeo Mano – art direction
- Shigeru Yasuda – lighting technician

== See also ==
- Motomezuka
