= Bakuro =

Bakuro may refer to:

- Bakuro-chō Kyoto
- Bakuro (Bakuro, the Horse Trainer), a Japanese Kyōgen classical demon comedy
