= Izumi Motoya =

Izumi Motoya 和泉 元彌
- Born: Motohisa Yamawaki (山脇 元彌, Yamawaki Motohisa); June 4, 1974; Tokyo, Japan
- Height: 170 cm (5 ft 7 in)
- Relatives: Junko Izumi (sister)
- Website: http://ameblo.jp/motoya1974/

Motoya Yamawaki (山脇 元彌, Yamawaki Motoya; born June 4, 1974), known professionally as Izumi Motoya (和泉 元彌), is a Japanese kyōgen actor, known for his appearances on television in NHK Taiga dramas, and for the scandal surrounding his assumption of the position of 20th sōke (head) of the Izumi school of kyōgen.

== Background ==
Motoya's father, Izumi Motohide, 19th-generation head of their family's school of kyōgen, died in 1995. Shortly before his death, a naming ceremony was performed, in which Motoya formally succeeded his father as head (sōke) of the school. However, this succession was not sanctioned by the Nōgaku sōke kai (Association of Heads of Schools of Noh), most of the members of which expressed that Motoya was too young, and not expert enough, to hold such a title. Motoya and his mother continued to insist upon Motoya's possession of that title, and the dispute continued until 2002, when, due to a variety of issues, including Motoya having supposedly failed to fulfill his performance commitments, the Nōgaku sōke kai and Nōgaku kyōkai (Noh Association) moved to have his entire family & school removed from those officially recognized by the Noh establishment. As of 2007, Izumi Motoya continued to claim the title of sōke, and the Noh establishment continued to refuse to recognize or support his work.

Nevertheless, Izumi has appeared in a number of NHK Taiga drama television programs, playing the eponymous character in the 2001 series Hōjō Tokimune, and Ashikaga Yoshiaki in the 2011 series Gō, as well as co-hosting Kōhaku Uta Gassen in 2000, and the Japanese coverage of the 2002 Winter Olympics.
