= Ōkura school =

The Ōkura school (大蔵流, -ryū) is, as are the Izumi school and the Sagi school, a school of kyogen, a form of traditional Japanese comic theater. Kyogen of Ōkura school uses an older form of Japanese language than does Izumi. Their kyogen preserves the sarugaku tradition.
