= Junko Izumi =

Junko Yamawaki (Japanese: 山脇淳子, romanized: Yamawaki Junko; born 1969), known professionally as Junko Izumi (Japanese: 和泉淳子, romanized: Izumi Junko) is a Japanese actress and the first woman to become a professional kyōgen performer.

== Biography ==
Junko Yamawaki, known professionally as Junko Izumi, was born in 1969. She is a descendent of the 19-generation Izumi line of performers of kyōgen, a Japanese comedic stage art. She began training as a performer at only 18 months old with her father and grandfather, and she began appearing onstage at age 3.

Izumi also studied at Japan Women's University, where she graduated with a degree in literature.

In 1989, at age 20, Junko Izumi was the first woman to become a professional kyōgen performer. Female performers had previously been limited to playing child roles, unable to continue with kyōgen into adulthood. She is considered a pioneer in this heavily male-dominated art form, with her promotion causing conflict within the conservative world of noh and kyōgen. She would go on to found the Women's Kyōgen Performers' Association in 2001.

Early in her career, Izumi faced frequent rejections from the major kyogen events. Nevertheless, she continued to perform across Japan and abroad, with a career spanning over 50 years.

Izumi also worked as a TV host for NHK in the late 1990s.

Her sister, Tokuro Miyake the 10th, joined her in the early 1990s as another pioneering woman in kyōgen, later followed by Junko's daughter Kyoko and niece Ayame Izumi. Her brother, Motoya Izumi, is also a kyōgen performer.
