= Motomezuka =

求塚
- English title: The Sought-for Grave
- Written by: Kan'ami
- Revised by: Zeami
- Category: 4th — miscellaneous
- Characters: waki Priest wakizure Companions maejite Maiden nochijite Unai tsure Two village girls
- Place: Ikuta, a village in Settsu Province
- Time: Early spring, 2nd month Reign of Go-Horikawa (1221–1232)
- Sources: Yamato Monogatari; Man'yōshū
- Schools: Hōshō, Kita, recently Kanze

Motomezuka (求塚) is a Noh play of the fourth category, written by Kan'ami and revised by Zeami. The name is either a corruption of, or a pun on, Otomezuka ("The Maiden's Grave"), the original story from episode 147 of Yamato Monogatari. The word motome refers also to courtship.

== Plot summary ==
A priest from the western provinces, travelling to Kyoto, stops with his companions in the isolated village of Ikuta ("Field of Life") in Settsu Province. They meet a group of village girls who are plucking spring shoots from the snow. When they ask a girl for directions to the famous "Sought-for Grave", she leads them to the place in question and tells the story of Unai.

Two men, Sasada and Chinu, declared their love for Unai in letters she received in the same hour. Unwilling to incur the jealousy of one by favouring the other, Unai declined to make a choice. Her parents had them compete for her hand, but each contest they proposed resulted in a draw.

In torment, Unai drowned herself in Ikuta River. After her funeral the two rivals were inconsolable, so they committed suicide by stabbing one another. Unai's ghost bears the karmic responsibility for their demise.

The priest intones prayers for her soul. She hears the prayers, but to no avail; she is unable to escape from the Burning House (the mortal world) and the Eight Great Hells, through which she is relentlessly lashed by her demons.

== Sources ==
Apart from the Yamato Monogatari, Unai's tomb is mentioned in the Man'yōshū (book 9, 1801-3, 1809–11, and book 19, 4211-2).

== Legacy ==
Yukio Mishima's novel The Frolic of the Beasts (1961) is considered a parody of Motomezuka.
