= Kyōgen =

Traditional Japanese comic theater

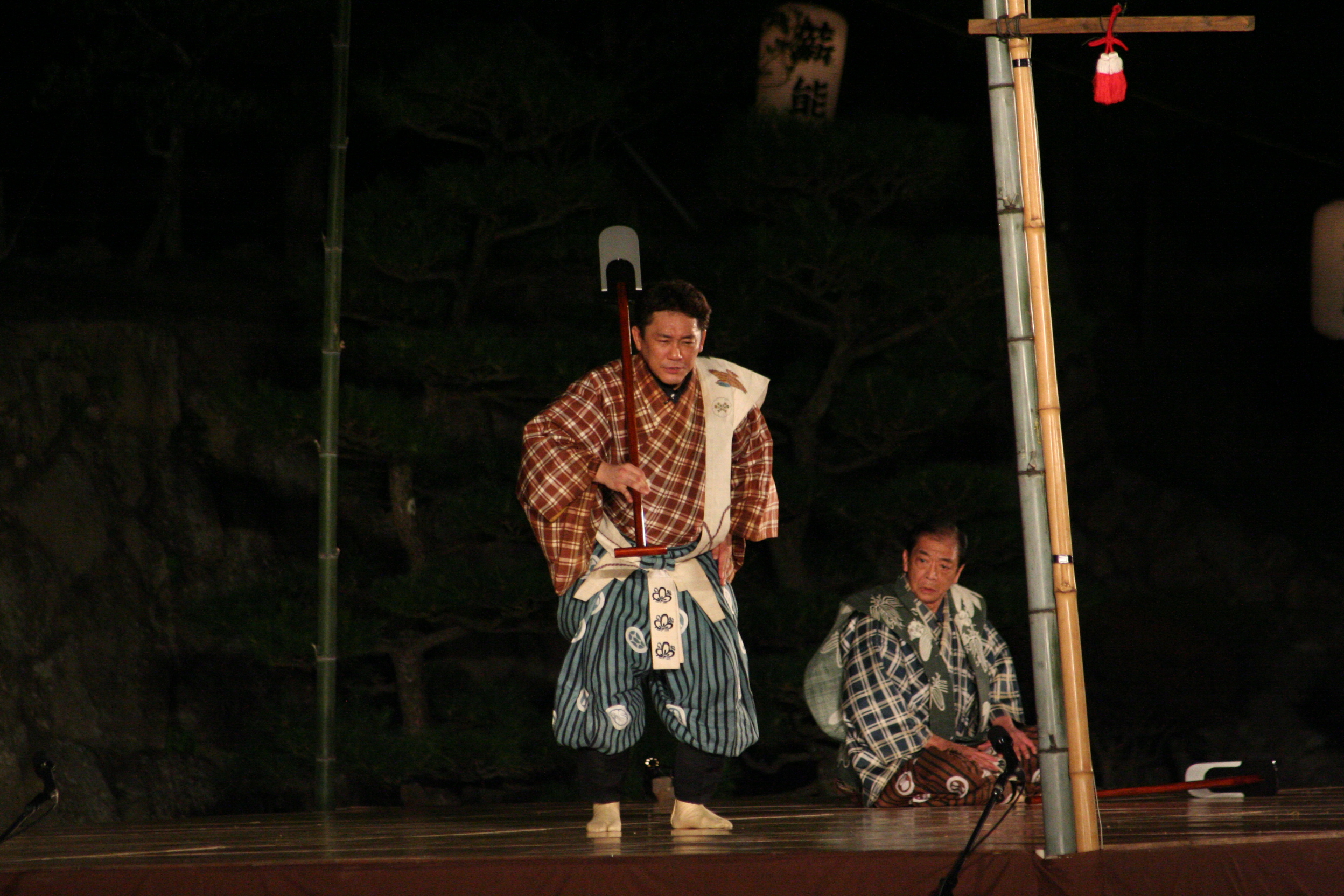
- Kyōgen performance at Himeji Castle
- Medium: Comic theatre
- Originating culture: Japan

Nōgaku theatre
- UNESCO Intangible Cultural Heritage
- Country: Japan
- Reference: 00012
- Region: Asia and the Pacific

Inscription history
- Inscription: 2008 (3rd session)
- List: Representative

Kyōgen (狂言; Japanese pronunciation: [kʲoː.ɡeꜜɴ, -ŋeꜜɴ]) is a form of traditional Japanese comic theater. It developed alongside Noh, was performed along with Noh as an intermission of sorts between Noh acts on the same stage, and retains close links to Noh in the modern day; therefore, it is sometimes designated Noh-kyōgen. Its contents are nevertheless not at all similar to the formal, symbolic, and solemn Noh theater; kyōgen is a comic form, and its primary goal is to make its audience laugh.

Kyōgen together with Noh is part of Nōgaku theatre.

Kyōgen is sometimes compared to the Italian comic form of commedia dell'arte, which developed in the early 17th century, and likewise features stock characters. It also has parallels with the Greek satyr play, a short, comical play performed between tragedies.

== History ==
One of the oldest ancestors of kyogen is considered to be a comical mimicry, which was one of the arts constituting Sangaku (ja:散楽), and Sangaku was introduced to Japan from China in the Nara period in the 8th century. In the Heian period (794－1185), sangaku developed into sarugaku by merging with Japanese traditional performing arts such as dengaku, and in the Kamakura period (1185－1333), it was divided into Noh, which was a drama of serious singing and dancing, and kyogen, which was a comical speech and play. When Kan'ami and Zeami completed Noh in the style known today in the early Muromachi period (1333－1573) in the 14th century, Kyōgen was a simple and comical short play different from the style known today, and performers of kyōgen were under the control of a Noh troupe. In the late Muromachi period, kyōgen as a form of theater was developed and the Ōkura school was established by kyōgen performers. In the Edo period (1606－1868), Sagi school and Izumi school were established. Since the Tokugawa shogunate designated kyōgen and Noh as ceremonial arts in the Edo period, kyōgen performers of these three schools were employed by the Tokugawa shogunate, each daimyō (feudal lord) and the Imperial Court, and kyōgen also developed greatly.

Kyōgen provided a major influence on the later development of kabuki theater. After the earlier, more ribald forms of kabuki had been outlawed in the mid-17th century, the government permitted the establishment of the new yarō-kabuki (men's kabuki) only on the grounds that it refrain from the previous kabuki forms' lewdness and instead model itself after kyōgen.

Noh had been the official entertainment form of the Edo period, and was therefore subsidized by the government. Kyōgen, performed in conjunction with Noh, also received the patronage of the government and the upper class during this time. Following the Meiji Restoration, however, this support ceased. Without government support, Noh and kyōgen went into decline, as many Japanese citizens gravitated toward the more "modern" Western art forms. In 1879, however, then-former US President Ulysses S. Grant and his wife, while touring Japan, expressed an interest in the traditional art of Noh. They became the first Americans to witness Noh and kyōgen plays and are said to have enjoyed the performance. Their approval is believed to have sparked a revival of interest in these forms.

In modern Japan, kyōgen is performed both separately and as a part of Noh. When performed as part of a Noh performance, kyōgen can take three forms: a separate (comic) kyōgen play, performed between two Noh plays (inter-Noh), which is known as honkyōgen (本狂言; actual kyōgen), as a (non-comic) scene within a Noh play (intra-Noh, between two scenes), which is known as aikyōgen (間狂言; in-between kyōgen, kyōgen interval), or as betsukyōgen (別狂言; special kyōgen).

In aikyōgen, most often the main Noh actor (shite) leaves the stage and is replaced by a kyōgen actor (狂言方, kyōgen-kata), who then explains the play (for the benefit of the audience), though other forms are also possible – the aikyōgen happening at the start, or the kyōgen actor otherwise interacting with the Noh actors. As part of Noh, aikyōgen is not comic – the manner (movements, way of speech) and costume are serious and dramatic. However, the actor is dressed in a kyōgen outfit and uses kyōgen-style language and delivery (rather than Noh language and delivery) – meaning simpler, less archaic language, delivered closer to a speaking voice – and thus can generally be understood by the audience, hence the role in explaining the play. Thus, while the costume and delivery are kyōgen-style (kyōgen in form), the clothing will be more elegant and the delivery less playful than in separate, comic kyōgen. Before and after aikyōgen, the kyōgen actor waits (kneeling in seiza) at the kyogen seat (狂言座, kyōgen-za) at the end of the bridge (hashigakari), close to the stage.

The traditions of kyōgen are maintained primarily by family groups, especially the Izumi school and Ōkura school.

For a comprehensive list of plays, see List of Kyōgen plays.

== Elements ==
Kyōgen plays are invariably brief – often about 10 minutes, as traditionally performed between acts of Noh – and often contain only two or three roles, which are often stock characters. Notable ones include Tarō kaja (太郎冠者; main servant, literally "firstborn son + servant"), Jirō kaja (次郎冠者; second servant, literally "second son + servant"), and the master (主人, shujin).

Movements and dialogue in kyōgen are typically very exaggerated, making the action of the play easy to understand. Elements of slapstick or satire are present in most kyōgen plays. Some plays are parodies of actual Buddhist or Shinto religious rituals; others are shorter, more lively, simplified versions of Noh plays, many of which are derived from folktales. As with Noh, jo-ha-kyū is a fundamental principle, which is particularly relevant for movement.

As with Noh and kabuki, all kyōgen actors, including those in female roles, are men. Female roles are indicated by a particular piece of attire, a binankazura (美男鬘) – a long white sash, wrapped around the head, with the ends hanging down the front of the body and tucked into the belt, like symbolic braids; at the two points (either side of the head) where the sash changes from being wrapped around to hanging down, the sash sticks up, like two small horns.

Similarly, actors play roles regardless of age – an old man may play the role of Tarō kaja opposite a young man playing master, for instance.

=== Costumes ===
Outfits are generally kamishimo (Edo period outfit consisting of kataginu top and hakama pants), with the master (if present) generally wearing nagabakama (long, trailing pants).

Actors in kyōgen, unlike those in Noh, typically do not wear masks, unless the role is that of an animal (such as a tanuki or kitsune), or that of a god. Consequently, the masks of kyōgen are less numerous in variety than Noh masks. Both masks and costumes are simpler than those characteristic of Noh. Few props are used, and minimal or no stage sets. As with Noh, a fan is a common accessory.

=== Language ===
The language in kyōgen depends on the period, but much of the classic repertoire is in Early Modern Japanese, reasonably analogous to Early Modern English (as in Shakespeare). The language is largely understandable to contemporary Japanese speakers, but sounds archaic, with pervasive use of the gozaru (ござる) form rather than the masu (ます) form that is now used (see copula: Japanese). For example, when acknowledging a command, Tarō kaja often replies with kashikomatte-gozaru (畏まってござる; "Yes sir!"), for which in modern Japanese one uses kashikomarimashita (畏まりました). Further, some of the words and nuances cannot be understood by modern audience (without notes), as in Shakespeare. This contrasts with Noh, where the language is more difficult and generally not understandable to a contemporary audience.

There are numerous set patterns – stock phrases and associated gestures, such as kashikomatte-gozaru (with a bow) and Kore wa mazu nanto itasō. Iya! Itashiyō ga gozaru. "So first, what to do. Aha! There is a way to do it.", performed while bowing and cocking head (indicating thought), followed by standing up with a start on Iya! Plays often begin with set phrases such as Kore wa kono atari ni sumai-itasu mono de gozaru. "This is the person who resides in this place." and (if featuring Tarō kaja) often end with Tarō kaja running off the stage yelling Yaru-mai zo, yaru-mai zo! "I won't do it, I won't do it!".

Lines are delivered in a characteristic rhythmic, sing-song voice, and generally quite loudly. Pace, pitch, and volume are all varied for emphasis and effect.

=== Movements ===
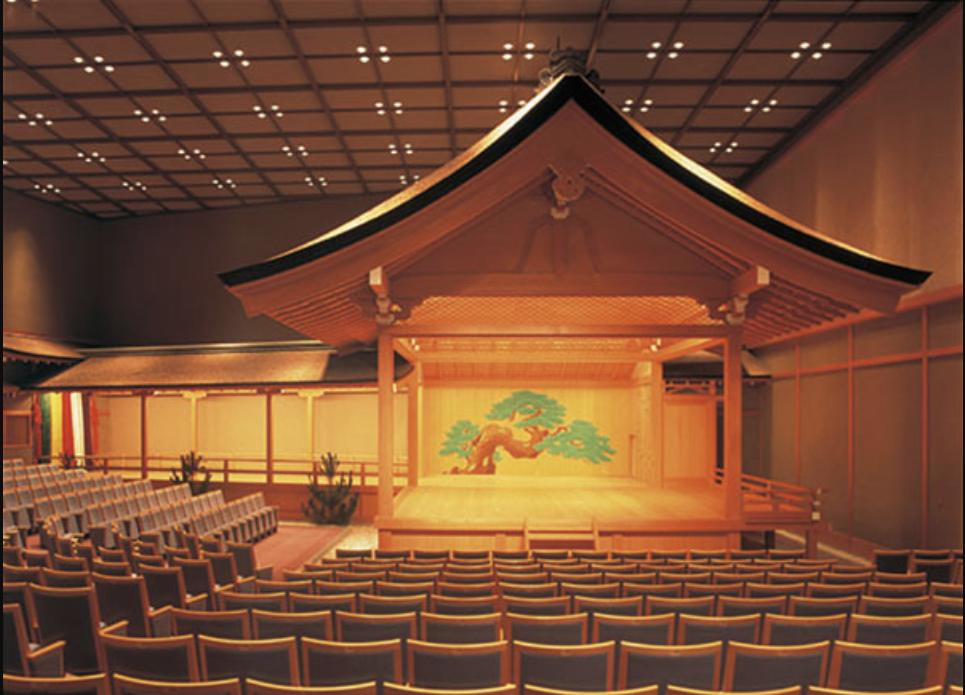
A contemporary Noh theatre with indoor roofed structure

As with Noh, which is performed on the same stage, and indeed many martial arts (such as kendo and aikido) actors move via suriashi (摺り足), sliding their feet, avoiding steps on the easily vibrated Noh stage. When walking, the body seeks to remain at the same level, without bobbing up or down. Plays also frequently feature stamping feet or otherwise hitting the ground (such as jumping) to take advantage of the stage.

As with Noh, angle of gaze is important, and usually a flat gaze is used (avoiding looking down or up, which create a sad or fierce atmosphere, which is to be avoided). Characters usually face each other when speaking, but turn towards the audience when delivering a lengthy speech.

Arms and legs are kept slightly bent. Unless involved in action, hands are kept on upper thighs, with fingers together and thumb tucked in – they move down to the sides of the knees when bowing.

=== Music ===
Kyōgen is performed to the accompaniment of music, especially the flute, drums, and gong. However, the emphasis of kyōgen is on dialogue and action, rather than on music or dance.

=== Space ===
Kyogen is generally performed on a Noh stage, as the stage is an important part of the play (the space, the reaction to stamps, the ease of sliding, etc.). It can, however, be performed in any space (particularly by amateur or younger performers), though if possible a Noh-like floor will be installed.

== Komai ==
In addition to the kyōgen plays themselves, performances include short dances called komai (小舞; small dance). These are traditional dramatic dances (not comic), performed to a chanted accompaniment, and with varied themes. The movements are broadly similar to Noh dances. The often archaic language used in the lyrics and the chanted delivery means that these chants are often not understandable to a contemporary audience.

== Kyōgen today ==
Today, kyōgen is performed and practiced regularly, both in major cities (especially Tokyo and Osaka) and throughout the country, and is featured on cultural television programs. In addition to the performances during Noh plays, it is also performed independently, generally in programs of three to five plays.

New kyogen are written regularly, though few new plays enter the repertoire. Particularly significant is Susugigawa (濯ぎ川; The Washing River), written and directed by Tetsuji Takechi in 1953, during his post-Kabuki theater work. Based on a medieval French farce, this play became the first new kyōgen to enter the traditional repertoire in a century. In rare cases bilingual kyōgen or fusion of kyōgen with Western forms has been done. An early example is the group Mei-no-kai, consisting of kyōgen, Noh, and shingeki actors, who staged Beckett's Waiting for Godot in 1973; the kyōgen acting was best received. A notable example is the Noho Theatre group, based in Kyoto, under the direction of American Jonah Salz and primary acting by Akira Shigeyama. This group has performed a bilingual Japanese/English translation of Susugigawa termed The Henpecked Husband, together with works by Samuel Beckett, notably the mime Act Without Words I, performed by a kyōgen actor in Japanese theatrical style (first performed 1981). This latter features kyōgen movements and Japanese cultural adaptations – for example, the nameless character contemplates suicide not by holding scissors to his throat (as per stage directions), but to his stomach, as if contemplating hara-kiri. Unusually for a Beckett adaptation, which are usually strictly controlled by Beckett and his estate, this was presented to Beckett and met with his approval.

The distinctive diction of kyōgen is also occasionally used in other media, with kyōgen actors working as voice actors. An example is the animated movie A Country Doctor (カフカ 田舎医者, Kafuka: Inaka Isha) by Kōji Yamamura, based on "A Country Doctor" by Franz Kafka, where the voices are performed by the Shigeyama family.

As with Noh, many Japanese are familiar with kyōgen only through learning about it in school or television performances. A play frequently featured in textbooks is Busu (附子; The Delicious Poison), where the servants Tarō-kaja and Jirō-kaja are entrusted with some sugar by their master, but told not to eat it, as it is poison; naturally, they eat it. As with Noh, many professional performers are born into a family, often starting performing at a young age, but others are not born into families and beginning practicing in high school or college. Unlike Noh drama or Nihon-buyō dance, who earn their living primarily via teaching and support from underlings in the iemoto system, but similar to rakugo comedy, professional kyōgen players earn their living from performing (possibly supplemented by side jobs), and maintain an active touring schedule. Due to the limited repertoire (a classical canon, of which many are no longer performed due to being dated, and few new plays enter) and frequent performances, a professional kyōgen actor can be expected to be familiar with all roles in all plays in their school's repertoire, and to perform them with some regularity.

While there are a number of kyōgen families, there are at present two leading families: the Nomura 野村 family of Tokyo (traditionally Edo region), and the Shigeyama 茂山 family of Kyoto (traditionally Kamigata region) of the Ōkura school, both of which are often featured performing on TV, appear in the news, and tour overseas, and have been involved in popularizing and some efforts at modernizing kyōgen. See also the List of Living National Treasures of Japan (performing arts), whose kyōgen members feature individuals from these families, among others.

In 1989, Junko Izumi became the first female professional kyōgen performer.

=== Foreign actors ===
In the post-war period, foreigners have participated in kyōgen as amateur performers. A notable early example was the 1956 performance by scholar and translator Donald Keene in the play Chidori (千鳥; Plover) with Tetsuji Takechi in the role of the sake shop owner, before an audience including such prominent authors as Tanizaki, Yasunari Kawabata and Yukio Mishima. This is featured in his series of essays, Chronicles of My Life in the 20th Century, and inspired the title of his anthology The Blue-Eyed Tarokaja: A Donald Keene Anthology. Today foreigners (resident in Japan, with sufficient Japanese skills) are able to practice with amateur troupes. In addition, since 1985, an intensive summer program (originally 6 weeks, now 3 weeks) in kyōgen for beginners has been run at the Kyoto Art Center, taught by Akira Shigeyama (of the Shigeyama family) and others, and organized by scholar of Japanese theater Jonah Salz.

== Plays ==
There are a few hundred plays in the repertoire (about 180 in the Okura school), but many are now rarely performed, as the audience will not understand the jokes, or would deem them offensive (e.g., for making fun of a blind money-lender).

Plays commonly studied and performed by beginners, due to brevity and simplicity, include Shibiri (痿痢; "Cramps", "Pins and Needles"), 舟船, 土筆, 以呂波, and Kuchimane (口真似; The Mimic). Kuchimane in particular is frequently performed. Another well-known play, featured in textbooks, is Busu (附子; "Wolfsbane", "The Delicious Poison"), mentioned above.

Another play is 柿山伏 (Kakiyamabushi or "Persimmon Mountain Hermit"), about an ascetic priest who hungers in the mountains; he uncovers and eats from a persimmon tree, which belongs to a farmer. The farmer catches him in the act and makes a fool out of the priest – getting the priest to pretend to be a crow, a monkey, and a large bird, causing him to fall from the tree. The priest later gets his revenge by chanting and summoning supernatural forces. But in the end, the farmer refuses to nurse the priest back to health.

== See also ==
- Manzai
- List of Kyōgen plays

== Sources ==
- Brandon, James R. (1997). Nō and Kyōgen in the Contemporary World. Honolulu: University of Hawai'i Press.
- Kenny, Don (compiler) (1989). The Kyogen book : an anthology of Japanese classical comedies. Tokyo: Japan Times. ISBN 4-7890-0459-7.
- Richie, Donald (1972). Three modern Kyogen. Rutland, Vermont: Tuttle Publishing. ISBN 0-8048-1038-9.
- Sakanishi, Shiho (1938). Kyôgen; comic interludes of Japan. Boston: Marshall Jones Company.
- Salz, Jonah (2007). "Contesting Authority through Comic Disruption: Mixed Marriages as Metaphor in Postwar Kyogen Experiments". In Hiroshi Nara (ed.). Inexorable Modernity: Japan's Grappling with Modernity in the Arts. Lanham, Maryland: Lexington Books. pp. 129–150. ISBN 978-0-7391-1842-9.
- Takeda, Sharon Sadako (2002). Miracles & mischief : Noh and Kyōgen theater in Japan. Los Angeles: Agency for Cultural Affairs, Government of Japan. ISBN 0-87587-188-7.
- Don Kenny, A Guide to Kyogen (Hinoki Shoten, 1968), ISBN 9784827910073
- Kyogen (Photographs by Tatsuo Yoshikoshi; written by Hisashi Hata; translated and edited by Don Kenny), Osaka: Hoikusha, 1982, ISBN 4586540397
