= List of Kyōgen plays =

This is a comprehensive list of the 273 Kyōgen plays in the current repertoire.

The total number of plays in the present active repertoire of the Okura and Izumi schools together comes to 260 plays. There are 180 plays in the Okura repertoire and 254 in the Izumi school. 174 of these are common to both schools, six are in the Okura school only, and 80 are only in the Izumi school repertoire.

== Categories of Kyōgen Plays ==
The following are the categories of plays and their number under the Izumi school:

1. Auspicious plays (waki kyōgen), 27 plays, including:
  1. God plays (kami mono), 6 plays
  2. Lucky-man plays (kahō mono), 5 plays
  3. Farmer plays (hyakushō mono), 9 plays
  4. Miscellaneous auspicious plays (zatsu mono), 7 plays
2. Daimyō, i.e. land owner (daimyō mono), 15 plays
3. Bridegrooms (muko mono), 20 plays
4. Servant (Tarō Kaja mono), 48 plays
5. Buddhist priest (shukke mono), 38 plays
6. Woman (onna mono), 39 plays
7. Demon (oni mono), 11 plays
8. Mountain priest (yamabushi mono), 9 plays
9. Blind man (zatō mono), 7 plays
10. Miscellaneous (zatsu kyōgen), 40 plays

== List of Kyōgen plays ==
Name	Kanji	Schools
Akubō; Akubo mends His Ways	悪坊	Izumi, Ōkura
Akagari; Chapped Feet	皹	Izumi, Ōkura
Akutagawa; The Crippled Leg and the Deformed Hand	芥川	Izumi, Ōkura
Akutarō; Akutaro Reforms	悪太郎	Izumi, Ōkura
Asahina; Asahina, the Warrior	朝比奈	Izumi, Ōkura
Asō; Aso Has His hair Fixed	麻生	Izumi, Ōkura
Awasegaki; Hybrid Persimmons	合柿	Izumi, Ōkura
Awataguchi; A Man Poses as a Sword	粟田口	Izumi, Ōkura
Bakuchi Jūō; A Gambler Bets the King of Hell	博奕十王	Izumi
Bakurō; Bakurō, the Horse Trainer	馬ロ労	Izumi
Bikusada; The Aged Nun and Bikusada	比丘貞	Izumi, Ōkura
Bishamon Renga; The God Bishamon and the Poem	毘沙門連歌	Izumi, Ōkura
Bonsan; The Dwarf Tree Thief	盆山	Izumi, Ōkura
Bō Shibari; Tied to a Stick	棒縛	Izumi, Ōkura
Buaku; Buaku, the Living Ghost	武悪	Izumi, Ōkura
Bunzō; The Tricky Memory Trick	文蔵	Izumi, Ōkura
Busshi; The Fake Sculptor	仏師	Izumi, Ōkura
Busu; The Delicious Fatal Poison	附子	Izumi, Ōkura
Chasanbai; An International Marriage Problem	茶子味梅	Izumi
Cha Tsubo; The Tea Box	茶壺	Izumi, Ōkura
Chidori; Catching Plovers	千鳥	Izumi, Ōkura
Chigiriki; Cautious Bravery	千切木	Izumi, Ōkura
Chigo Yabusame; The Horseback Archery Ceremony Defiled	児流鏑馬	Izumi
Chikubushima Mairi; The Pilgrimage to Chikubu Island	竹生島詣	Izumi
Daihannya; The Buddhist Sutra and the Shinto Dance	大般若	Izumi
Daikoku Renga; Daikoku and the Poets	大黒連歌	Izumi, Ōkura
Dobu Kachiri; Plunk! Click!	丼礑	Izumi, Ōkura
Dochi Hagure; A Day Wasted for Want of a Decision	どちはぐれ	Izumi
Domori; The Stutter	吃り	Izumi, Ōkura
Dongongusa; The Foolroot Weed	鈍根草	Izumi
Dontarō; Dontaro’s Method for Handling Women; Okura title: Dondaro	鈍太郎	Izumi, Ōkura
Ebisu Bishamon; Ebisu and Bishamon	夷毘沙門	Izumi, Ōkura
Ebisu Daikoku; Ebisu and Daikoku	夷大黒	Izumi, Ōkura
Echigo Muko; The Groom from Echigo	越後智	Izumi
Fuji Matsu; The Fuji Pine	富士松	Izumi, Ōkura
Fukitori; To Flute for a Wife	吹取	Izumi, Ōkura
Fukube no Shin; The Gourd God and Taro	福部の神	Izumi
Fuku no Kami; The God of Happiness	福の神	Izumi, Ōkura
Fukurō Yamabushi; The Hooting Yamabushi	梟山伏	Izumi, Ōkura
Fumi Ninai; Two to Deliver One Letter	文荷	Izumi, Ōkura
Fumi Yamadachi; The Cowardly Bandits	文山賊	Izumi, Ōkura
Fumizumō; Wrestling by the Book	文相撲	Izumi, Ōkura
Funa Watashi Muko; The Groom in the Boat	船渡智	Izumi, Ōkura
Fune Funa; A Pronunciation Problem	船ふな	Izumi, Ōkura
Fuse Nai Kyō; Sermon Without Donation	無布施経 (Ōkura: 布施無経)	Izumi, Ōkura
Futari Bakama; Two People in One Hakama	二人袴	Izumi, Ōkura
Futari Daimyō; Two Daimyo	二人大名	Izumi, Ōkura
Gan Daimyō; The Goose Stealing Daimyo	雁大名	Izumi
Gan Karigane; Two Words for Goose	雁鴈金	Izumi, Ōkura
Gan Tsubute; A Goose and a Pebble	鴈礫	Izumi, Ōkura
Gyūba; The Race of the Horse and the Cow	牛馬	Izumi, Ōkura
Hachiku Renga; A Debt Paid with a Poem	八句連歌	Izumi, Ōkura
Hachi Tataki; The Gourd Beaters	鉢叩	Izumi, Ōkura
Hagi Daimyō; The Daimyo and the Bush Clover Blossoms	萩大名	Izumi, Ōkura
Hakuyō; Hakuyo, the Blind Biwa Borrower	伯養	Izumi, Ōkura
Hana Arasoi; The Flower Quarrel	花争	Izumi, Ōkura
Hanago; Visiting Hanago	花子	Izumi, Ōkura
Hana Nusubito; The Flower Thief	花盗人	Izumi, Ōkura
Hana Ori; Forbidden Blossoms	花折	Izumi, Ōkura
Hanatorizumō; Nose-Pulling Sumo	鼻取相撲	Izumi, Ōkura
Hara Tatezu; Priest Angerless Honesty	腹不立 (Ōkura: 腹立てず)	Izumi, Ōkura
Haridako; Dried Octopus	張蛸	Izumi
Hige Yagura; The Fortified Beard	髭櫓	Izumi, Ōkura
Hikkukuri; Tied Up in a Sack	引括	Izumi
Hikuzu; Tea Chaff	簸屑	Izumi
Hi no Sake; Piped In Sake	樋の酒	Izumi
Hisshiki Muko; The Groom with a Leather Loin Cloth	引敷聟	Izumi
Hito o Uma; Man Into Horse	人を馬	Izumi
Hōchō Muko; The Butcherknife Groom	庖丁聟	Izumi
Hōjō no Tane; The Tall Tale Seed	謀生種	Izumi
Hone Kawa; The Mixed-up Acolyte	骨皮	Izumi, Ōkura
Hōshi Ga Haha; The Baby’s Mother	法師が母	Izumi, Ōkura
Igui; Igui, the Disappearing Boy	井杭 (Ōkura: 居杭)	Izumi, Ōkura
Imajimmei; The Unsuccessful Tea Shop; Ōkura title: Kurikuma Shimei	今神明 (Ōkura: 栗隈神明)	Izumi, Ōkura
Ima Mairi; Hired for a Riddle	今参	Izumi, Ōkura
I Monji; The Letter I	伊文字	Izumi, Ōkura
Inabadō; A Bad Wife is like a Bad Penny	因幡堂	Izumi, Ōkura
Inu Yamabushi; The Dog and the Yamanushi	犬山伏	Izumi
Iori No Ume; The Plum Blossom Hut	庵の梅	Izumi, Ōkura
Iroha; Learning the Alphabet	伊呂波	Izumi, Ōkura
Irumagawa; The Iruma River	入間川	Izumi, Ōkura
Ishigami; The Stone God	石神	Izumi, Ōkura
Iwahashi; The Shy Bride	岩橋	Izumi
Jinsenseki; Saved by a Resemblance	二千石	Izumi, Ōkura
Jishaku; The Human Magnet	磁石	Izumi, Ōkura
Jizō Mai; The Dance of the God Jizo	地蔵舞	Izumi, Ōkura
Jūki; Juki, the Clumsy Acolyte	重喜	Izumi, Ōkura
Kachiguri; Dried Chestnuts	勝栗	Izumi
Kagami Otoko; The Man and the Mirror	鏡男	Izumi, Ōkura
Kagyū; The Snail	蝸牛	Izumi, Ōkura
Kaichū Muko; The Pocketed Groom	懐中聟	Izumi
Kaki Yamabushi; The Persimmon Thief	柿山伏	Izumi, Ōkura
Kakushidanuki; Hiding the Badger	隠狸	Izumi
Kakusui; The Water Horn Groom	角水	Izumi
Kamabara; Unsuccessful Suicide with a Sickle	鎌腹	Izumi, Ōkura
Kaminari; Thunder	神鳴 (Ōkura: 雷)	Izumi, Ōkura
Kanaoka; Kanaoka, the Love-crazed Painter	金岡	Izumi
Kanazu Jizo; The Impudent Jizo Statue	金津地蔵 (Ōkura:金津)	Izumi, Ōkura
Kane no Ne; The Sound of Bells	鐘の音	Izumi, Ōkura
Kani Yamabushi; The Yamabushi and the Crab	蟹山伏	Izumi, Ōkura
Kasen; The Six Poets	歌仙	Izumi
Kawakami; Blindness, Sight, and Blindness Again	川上	Izumi
Kawara Tarō; Taro’s Wife Revolts at Kawara	河原太郎	Izumi, Ōkura
Kazumō; Wrestling with a Mosquito	蚊相撲	Izumi, Ōkura
Keimyō; A Cat Killed for Killing a Chicken	鶏猫	Izumi, Ōkura
Keiryū; Does a Cock Crow or Sing?	鶏流	Izumi
Kikazu Zatō; The Deaf Man and the Blind Man	不聞座頭	Izumi, Ōkura
Kiku no Hana; The Chrystanthemum; Okura title: Bōbōgashira	菊の花 (Ōkura: 茫々頭)	Izumi, Ōkura
Kinya; Keep Quiet and Keep Out of Trouble	禁野	Izumi
Kirokuda; The Half Delivered Gift	木六駄	Izumi, Ōkura
Kitsunezuka; The Fox Mound	狐塚	Izumi, Ōkura
Kiyomizu Zatō; The Blind Couple at Kiyomizu Temple	清水座頭	Izumi
Kobu Kaki; Seaweed and Persimmons	昆布柿	Izumi
Kobu Uri; The Seaweed Seller	昆布売	Izumi, Ōkura
Kogarakasa; The Umbrella Sutra	小傘	Izumi
Kōji; Three Tangerines on a Branch	柑子	Izumi, Ōkura
Kōjidawara; The Tangerine Bag	柑子俵	Izumi
Kono Mi Arasoi; The Battle of Fruits and Vegetables	木実争	Izumi, Ōkura
Ko Nusubito; The Amateur Kidnapper	子盗人	Izumi, Ōkura
Koshi Inori; The Back-Straightening Prayer	腰祈	Izumi, Ōkura
Kōyakuneri; The Glue Fight	膏薬煉	Izumi, Ōkura
Kubi Hiki; Neck Pulling	首引	Izumi, Ōkura
Kuchi Mane; The Mimic	口真似	Izumi, Ōkura
Kuchimane Muko; The Mimic Groom	口真似聟	Izumi
Kui Ka Hito Ka; Post or Person?	杭か人か	Izumi
Kuji Zainin; Sinner by Lottery	鬮罪人	Izumi, Ōkura
Kumo Nusubito; The Spider Thief	蜘盗人	Izumi, Ōkura
Kurama Mairi; The Blessing Transfer	鞍馬参	Izumi, Ōkura
Kurama Muko; The Groom from Kurama	鞍馬参聟	Izumi
Kuri Yaki; Roasting Chestnuts	栗焼	Izumi, Ōkura
Kusabira; Mushrooms	茸	Izumi, Ōkura
Mago Muko; The Grandson Groom	孫聟	Izumi
Makura Monogurui; Grandfather in Love	枕物狂	Izumi, Ōkura
Mari Zatō; Blind Man’s Football	鞠座頭	Izumi, Ōkura
Matsu Bayashi; The Song and Dance of the Pine	松囃子	Izumi
Matsu Yani; The Spirit of Pine Resin	松脂	Izumi, Ōkura
Matsu Yuzuriha; One Hat for Two	松楪	Izumi, Ōkura
Mejika; Fans of Mistaken Identity	目近	Izumi, Ōkura
Mi Kazuki; The Winnow Basket Hat	箕被	Izumi, Ōkura
Mizu Kake Muko; The Water Throwing Son-in-Law	水掛聟	Izumi, Ōkura
Mizu Kumi; Drawing Water; Okura title Ocha no Mizu	水汲 (Ōkura: お茶の水)	Izumi, Ōkura
Mochizake; Late Taxes	餅酒	Izumi
Morai Muko; The Repentant Husband	貰聟	Izumi, Ōkura
Mune Tsuki; Punched in the Chest	胸突	Izumi, Ōkura
Nabe Yatsubachi; Pots and Drums	鍋八撥	Izumi, Ōkura
Nagamitsu; The Sword Nagamitsu	長光	Izumi, Ōkura
Naginata Ashirai; The Halberd Welcome	長刀応答	Izumi
Naki Ama; The Crying Nun	泣尼	Izumi, Ōkura
Namagusamono; The Raw Fish	腥物	Izumi
Nariagari; A Strange Evolution	成上り	Izumi, Ōkura
Narihira Mochi; The Poet and the Rice Cakes	業平餅	Izumi, Ōkura
Naruko; Bird Clappers	鳴子	Izumi
Naruko Yaruko; The Bird Clapper Quarrel	鳴子遣子	Izumi, Ōkura
Natorigawa; The Name Stealing River	名取川	Izumi, Ōkura
Nawa Nai; Rope Twisting	縄綯	Izumi, Ōkura
Negi Yamabushi; The Negi and the Yamabushi	禰宜山伏	Izumi, Ōkura
Ne Ongyoku; Horizontal Singing	寝音曲	Izumi, Ōkura
Nikujuhachi; 2918	二九十八	Izumi, Ōkura
Niō; The Fake Deva King	仁王	Izumi, Ōkura
Niwatori Muko; The Rooster Groom	鶏聟	Izumi, Ōkura
Nukegara; Shedding the Demon Shell	脱殻	Izumi, Ōkura
Nuritsuke; Lacquered-While-You-Wait	塗附	Izumi
Nushi Heiroku; Heiroku, the Lacquerer	塗師平六	Izumi, Ōkura
Nyakuichi; The Nun Nyakuichi’s Revenge	若市	Izumi, Ōkura
Oba Ga Sake; The Stingy Aunt and her Sake	伯母ケ酒	Izumi, Ōkura
Ohiyashi; Wrapping Up Coolness	お冷し	Izumi
Okadayū; Rice Cakes Called Okadayu	岡太夫	Izumi, Ōkura
Ongyoku Muko; The Rythmical Groom	音曲聟	Izumi
Onigawara; The Demon-Faced Tile	鬼瓦	Izumi, Ōkura
Onimaru; Onimaru Reforms	鬼丸	Izumi
Oni No Mamako; The Demon’s Stepchild	鬼の継子	Izumi, Ōkura
Origami Muko; The Dowery of Paper Toys	折紙聟	Izumi
Ōtōnai; Otonai, the Sissy	大藤内	Izumi
Rakuami; Rakuami, the Flute Playing Priest	楽阿弥	Izumi, Ōkura
Renga Jittoku; A Poem or a Robe?	連歌十徳	Izumi
Renga Nusubito; The Popem Living Thieves	連歌盗人	Izumi, Ōkura
Roku Jizō; The Six Statues	六地蔵	Izumi, Ōkura
Rokuninso; Six Shaved Heads	六人僧	Izumi
Rōmusha; The Old Men Win the Boy	老武者	Izumi, Ōkura
Roren; Almost a Priest	呂連	Izumi, Ōkura
Sadogitsune; The Sado Fox	佐渡狐	Izumi, Ōkura
Saihō; Three Grandsons Named	財宝	Izumi, Ōkura
Sai No Me; Counting Dice Spots	賽の目	Izumi
Sakekō no Shiki; A Parent-Teacher Problem	酒講式	Izumi
Sakka; Sakka, the Thief	咲嘩	Izumi
Sako no Samurō; The Hunter and the Priest	左近三郎	Ōkura
Sanbonbashira; Three Poles	三本柱	Izumi, Ōkura
Sanninbu; Three Farmers	三人夫	Izumi
Sannin Chōja; Three Millionaires	三人長者	Izumi
Sannin Katawa; The Handicapped Three	三人片輪	Izumi, Ōkura
Saru Muko; The Monkey Groom	猿聟	Izumi
Saru Zatō; The Blind Man and the Monkey	猿座頭	Izumi, Ōkura
Satsumanokami; The Forgotten Boat Fare	薩摩守	Izumi, Ōkura
Seirai; Serai, the Hawk Keeper and Emma, the Kind of Hell	政頼	Izumi, Ōkura
Semi; The Locust	蝉/蟬	Izumi
Senjimono; The Tea Seller	煎じ物	Izumi, Ōkura
Setsubun; A Demon in Love	節分	Izumi, Ōkura
Shatei; The Brother Fight	舎弟	Izumi, Ōkura
Shibiri; Inherited Cramps	しびり	Izumi, Ōkura
Shidōhōgaku; Shidōhōgaku, the Horse	止動方角	Izumi, Ōkura
Shimizu; A Demon for Better Working Conditions	清水	Izumi, Ōkura
Shinbai; The Pine Branch and the Sword	真奪	Izumi, Ōkura
Shujō; The New Staff	柱杖	Izumi
Shūkugarakasa; The Riddle Umbrella	秀句傘	Izumi, Ōkura
Shūron; A Religious Dispute	宗論	Izumi, Ōkura
Sōhachi; A Priest and a Cook	宗八 (Ōkura:惣八)	Izumi, Ōkura
Sora Ude; A Brave Coward	空腕	Izumi, Ōkura
Suehiro; An Umbrella instead of a Fan	末広	Izumi, Ōkura
Sugoroku; Backgammon	双六	Izumi
Su Hajikami; Vinegar and Ginger	酢薑	Izumi, Ōkura
Suminuri; Black Crocodile Tears	墨塗	Izumi, Ōkura
Suō Otoshi; The Dropped Gift	素袍落	Izumi, Ōkura
Suzukibōchō; How to Cut Sea-Perch	鱸庖丁	Izumi, Ōkura
Tachi Ubai; Sword Stealing	太刀奪	Izumi, Ōkura
Taiko Oi; The Drum Bearer	太鼓負	Izumi
Taishi No Teboko; The Crown Prince’s Haberd	太子手鉾	Izumi
Takara No Kasa; The Magic Straw Hat	寶の笠	Izumi
Takara no Tsuchi; The Magic Drum Stick	寶の槌	Izumi, Ōkura
Take no Ko; Bamboo Sprouts	筝	Izumi, Ōkura
Tako; The Octopus	蛸	Izumi, Ōkura
Tanuki no Hara Tsuzumi; The Badger’s Belly Drum	狸腹鼓	Izumi, Ōkura
Taru Muko; The Groom and the Sake Jug	樽聟	Izumi
Taue; The Rice Planting Ceremony	田植	Izumi
Tobikoe; Jump Across	飛越	Izumi, Ōkura
Tōjin Kodakara; The Chinaman and his Devoted Son	唐人子宝	Izumi
Tōjinzumō; Chinese Sumo	唐人相撲	Izumi, Ōkura
Tokoro; The Mountain Potato	野老	Izumi
Tsūen; Tsuen, the Tea Priest	通園	Izumi, Ōkura
Tsukimi Zatō; The Moon-Viewing Blind Man	月見座頭	Ōkura
Tsukushi no Oku; Laughs After Taxes	筑紫奥	Izumi, Ōkura
Tsuribari; The Capricious Magic Fish Hook	釣針	Izumi, Ōkura
Tsurigitsune; Fox Trapping	釣狐	Izumi, Ōkura
Tsurushi; The Cowardly Bow String Maker	弦師	Izumi
Tsuto Yamabushi; The Lunch Thief	苞山伏	Izumi
Tsutsu Sasae; The Sake Container	筒竹筒	Izumi
Uchizata; The Trial Rehearsal; Ōkura title: Oko Sako	内沙汰 (Ōkura: 右近左近)	Izumi, Ōkura
Uguisu; The Nightingale	鶯	Izumi
Uozeppō; The Fish Sermon	魚説法	Izumi, Ōkura
Uri Nusubito; The Melon Thief	瓜盗人	Izumi, Ōkura
Urusashi; Mind Your Own Business!	右流左止	Izumi
Ushi Nusubito; The Cow Thief	牛盗人	Izumi
Uta Arasoi; The Poem Fight; Ōkura title: Tsukuzukushi	歌争 (Ōkura: 土筆)	Izumi, Ōkura
Utsubozaru; The Monkey Skin Quiver	靱猿	Izumi, Ōkura
Wakame; A Girl Poses as Seaweed	若和布	Izumi
Wakana; Spring, Girls, and Sake	若菜	Izumi
Yao; A Sinner With References	八尾	Izumi, Ōkura
Yakusui; Medicinal Water	薬水	Izumi
Yase Matsu; Skinny Pine; Ōkura title: Kintōzaemon	痩松 (Ōkura: 金藤左衛門)	Izumi, Ōkura
Yawata No Mae; Groom with Prompter	八幡前	Izumi, Ōkura
Yobi Koe; Tricked by a Rhythm	呼声	Ōkura
Yokoza; The Cow Named Yokoza	横座	Izumi, Ōkura
Yoneichi; A Rice Bale Mistaken for a Girl	米市	Izumi, Ōkura
Yoroi Haramaki; Armour on Paper	鎧腹巻	Izumi, Ōkura
Yuki Uchi; The Snow Fight	雪打	Izumi
Yumi Ya; The Bow Maker and the Arrow Maker	弓矢	Izumi
Yumi Ya Tarō; Bow and Arrow Taro	弓矢太郎	Izumi
Yūzen; Yūzen, the Unskillful Umbrella Maker	祐善	Izumi, Ōkura

== See also ==
- List of Noh plays
- Kyōgen
