= Nōgaku =

Classical Japanese musical drama style

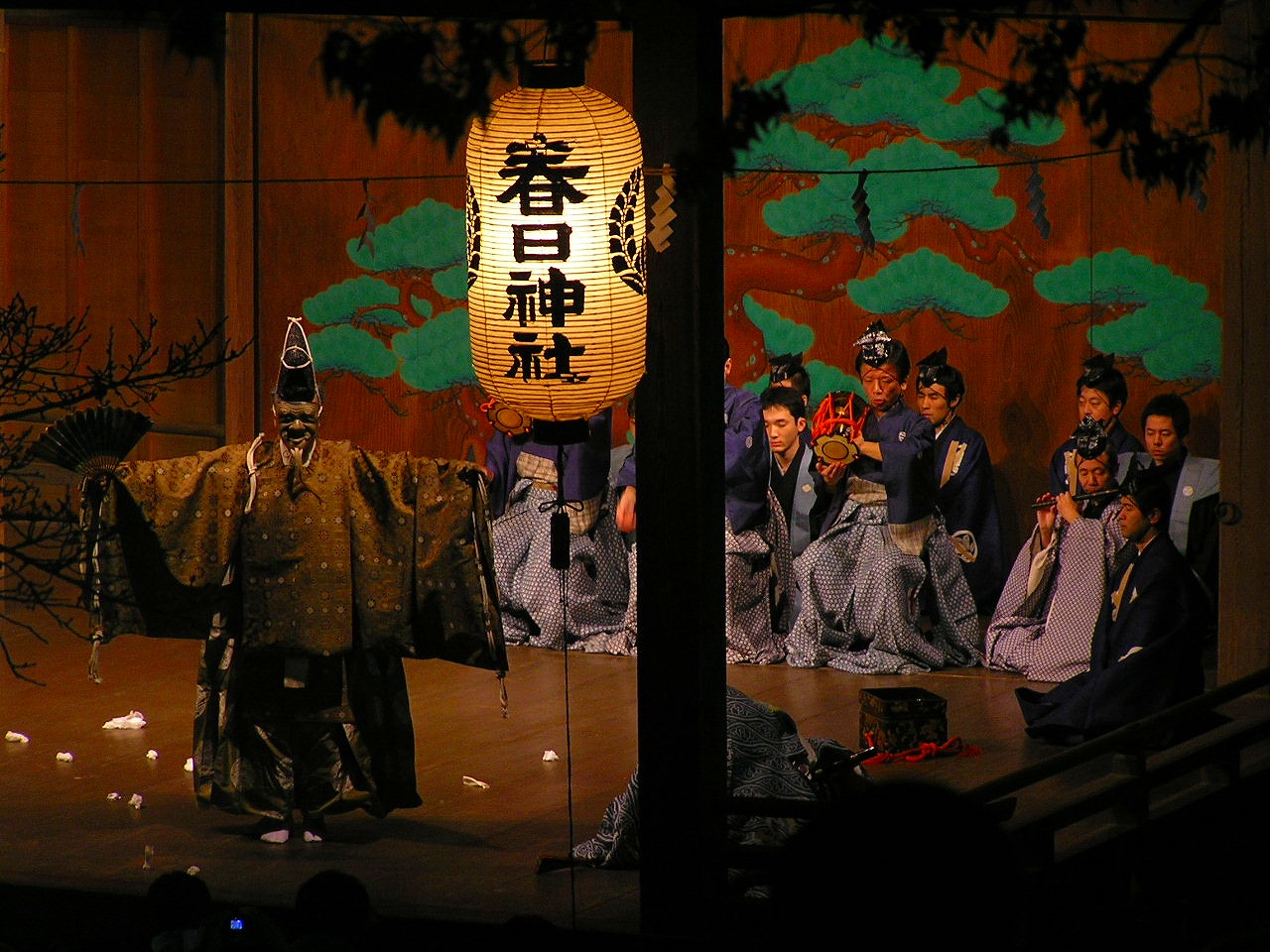
- Noh performance at Shinto shrine
- Medium: Theater
- Types: Noh and kyōgen
- Originating culture: Japan

Nôgaku theatre
- UNESCO Intangible Cultural Heritage
- Country: Japan
- Reference: 00012
- Region: Asia and the Pacific

Inscription history
- Inscription: 2008 (3rd session)
- List: Representative

Nōgaku (能楽; Japanese pronunciation: [noː.ɡa.kɯ, -ŋa-]) is one of the traditional styles of Japanese theater. It is composed of the lyric drama noh, and the comic theater kyōgen (狂言). Traditionally, both types of theatre are performed together, the kyōgen being interposed between the pieces of noh during a day of performances.

It has influenced the Bunraku, or Japanese puppet theatre as well as Kabuki.

Nōgaku theatre was inscribed in 2008 by UNESCO on the List of Masterpieces of the Oral and Intangible Heritage of Humanity.
