= Dengaku =

Japanese celebratory rustic dance

Dengaku (田楽) were rustic Japanese celebrations that can be classified into two types: dengaku that developed as a musical accompaniment to rice planting observances, and the dengaku dances that developed in conjunction with sangaku. The dengaku celebrated for rice planting was performed by villagers either at the New Year or during the planting season in early summer. It was only in the 14th century that these dances were brought to the cities and incorporated into Noh theater, notably by the playwright and actor Kan'ami. The instrument of dengaku is the sasara, a wooden percussive instrument clapper, though there are other instruments that can be used.

In the Eiga Monogatari, there is a detailed description of the rice-planting dengaku. After being brought to the aristocrats, dengaku flourished till the end of the Heian period (794–1185) and became the main performing art of the Kamakura period (1185–1333), as well as part of the performing arts of the Muromachi period (1336–1573).

By the end of the Muromachi period, dengaku had been eclipsed by sarugaku. Today it barely survives as a folk performing art.

Dengaku was closely linked with the native Japanese religion of Shinto. Ritualistic elements of this were incorporated with sarugaku to form Noh theatre.

== Political aspect of dengaku ==
In the late 11th century, Kyoto experienced dengaku performances that attracted all classes of people, either as observers or as participants. Some of these events ended peacefully, while others descended into violence; however, all were characterized by parades of people dressed in colorful costumes while dancing and playing loud music.

Dengaku started as the music and dancing that performed in conjunction with field labor called ta-asobi. This form of rural entertainment evolved during the Heian period in response to diverse social, economic, political, and cultural movements. Two types of dengaku had developed by the latter half of the period. The first was the entertainment that accompanied field labor, but with new elements: the increasingly dominant entertaining aspect and the growing interest shown by local nobles. The nobility desired to "dominate rural areas, to increase crops, and thereby to boost tax income from the countryside". The second originated in the Kyoto-area temples and shrines which started adding dengaku to their sacred rites and services on account of the entertainment's growing popularity and its ability to attract large audiences.

With the 10th-century urban growth of Kyoto, dengaku slowly dissociated itself from both the agricultural and religious context. For two centuries after the end of the 11th century, dengaku was the most popular form of entertainment. Its earliest mention appears in the Nihon Kiryaku, where a performance is recorded taking place at the Matsuo festival in Yamazaki in 998. In 1023, the kampaku (regent) Fujiwara no Michinaga sought to entertain his daughter Shōshi, who was the mother of Emperor Go-Ichijō. He ordered that rice-planting should be carried out so that the activity could be viewed from the pavilion of the palace where she was staying. On that day, she looked down on the farmers as they worked the field and witnessed a dengaku performance. This was a new element in that nobles were viewing the performances and enjoying the experience. Throughout the 11th century, nobility interest was evident in dengaku as a way of dominating rural culture or as pure entertainment.

A new style developed, and has been called fūryū dengaku. Fūryū is a generic term for the processions that developed during the second half of the Heian period, when catastrophes repeatedly struck Kyoto and its environs. Processions were organized to placate the deities, demons, and ghosts thought responsible, characterized by the colorful costumes worn by the performers and the loud music. Dengaku was adopted by some of the most powerful shrines in Kyoto and came to be regularly performed at the goryō-e (one of the capital's main festivals and meant to appease agitated spirits). The original dengaku of the rice fields continued to flourish in rural society and in fact still survives in many agricultural areas.

The fusion of the two types into a new form of entertainment originated with the developing relationship between the urban and rural societies of the time. The goryō-e festival at the Gion Shrine played a major role in bringing about this fusion. The festival was a major gathering of Kyoto citizens and peasants from surrounding villages. These assemblies, motivated by fear and superstition, easily took on a political or social perspective in times of dissatisfaction, and became a rallying point for support of future political developments. As a result, dengaku obtained a significance far beyond its original ritual, religious, and artistic merits.

The end of the 11th century was witness to the end of the kampaku system of government and the beginning of the insei form. The insei system began in 1086, with the Emperor Shirakawa taking local control following his abdication. The new type of government took advantage of the public interest in dengaku shown by the growing participation of the masses in religious, political, and cultural affairs. With the Great Dengaku movement, the insei government strove to prove its independence of the kampaku system. Dengaku was an effective means to obtain that goal.

== Dengaku and "Folklorism" ==
Folklorism is "folklore on display, mainly for purposes of tourism or cultural preservation". The presentation of Japan's folk performing arts occur frequently "out-of-context" at a number of events for folk-culture and tourism where context is "taken to mean local Shinto or Buddhist festivals and ceremonials". These performing arts have been divided into categories by scholars that incorporate these contexts: those known as dengaku are typically part of the late-winter or early-spring festivals to guarantee a successful agricultural cycle.

Thornbury (1995) indicates that the study of folk performing arts began in the late 1920s and is "an important area of inquiry both in folklore research and in research on the performing arts in general". She noted that often the studies that came out of these two fields of research had little to do with each other or the realities of the folk performing arts as they currently exist. One exception was the work of Yamaji Kōzō, which identified seven patterns to describe how performances could be rooted in communities. The seven patterns identify a historic basis for understanding the relationship between folk performing arts and associated regions: showing the significance of the folk performing arts in the cultural history of Japan. Yamaji directly mentions dengaku in the second and third patterns.

Yamaji's second pattern, covering the late 12th to late 16th centuries, when provincial manors were established by the nobles and by powerful religious complexes that introduced festivals like those held in Kyoto to honor their deities. Some performers were sent from the capital but most developed locally. Yamaji refers to this period's processions with their displays of performing arts such as dengaku odori ("dengaku dances"). The Kasuga Wakamiya Onmatsuri, which began in 1136, is one of the best documented of Japan's folk performing arts events and is an example of this pattern.

Dating from the same time period as the second pattern, the third focuses on those performing arts that were incorporated into the ceremonials of Buddhist temples established by local clans. Ennen is the blanket term for such performing arts such as dengaku odori. Performers with professional experience in these particular performing arts were hired to teach the priests and youths-in-training at the temples. A current example of this pattern is Motsuji Ennen (Iwate Prefecture).

While Yamaji's analysis cannot account for every form of folk performing art, the evidence for a large portion is insufficient for certainty but it does dismiss the notion that folk performing arts are originally local creations. This is not to say that every folk performing art was born in a cultural capital: ta-asobi is one exception that is frequently mentioned.

== Carnival aspect ==
Shuten Dōji, or Drunken Demon, is "one of the most famous and popular oni legends in medieval Japanese literature". According to the legend, Shuten Dōji (overlord of the oni) and his followers were "abducting and devouring young Kyoto maidens" and warriors were sent by the imperial court to destroy them. The warriors, helped by attending deities, carried out this mission: rescuing the survivors and restoring peace to the land. Carnivalesque literature "inverts power structures, demystifying and lampooning that which a particular culture holds serious or sacred". At one point in the legend, a group of oni disguised as a dengaku troupe emerge to entertain the warriors. A fierce stare wards them off.

The general meaning of dengaku "refers to all rituals related to agriculture and thus to fertility and regeneration". It could be simply described as a form of dance in which some people play musical instruments while dancing in various combinations. In the Ōeyama ekotoba scroll, two warriors visit a shrine to pray for protection and are entertained by dengaku. In the scene at villain's palace, the oni also perform dengaku. The locations of the performances are similar. The angles of the buildings are the same. The postures and costumes are identical. The oni's dengaku lampoons the earlier and more wholesome dance at the shrine: the shrine performance is for the warriors' prayers to succeed in their mission whereas the oni dengaku seeks to trick the warriors so to facilitate killing them.

Dengaku is described as being welcomed by all classes for its fund-raising capacity. A monk organized a dengaku competition to raise funds for the building of a bridge. Those in attendance for the performance ranged from members of the imperial court down to commoners. All in attendance were fascinated by the dengaku until the collapse of the reviewing stand claimed the lives of people of all backgrounds. This contrast between a fertility ritual and the deaths of innocent people is important to this carnivalesque event: it represents both destruction and renewal.

The growth of the performing arts was considered by part of Japanese society to be a bad omen: "the sudden appearance of oni as a dengaku troupe in the story can be seen as a harbinger of Shuten Dōji's doom". It could be said that this carnivalesque ritual leads to the demise of Shuten Dōji. The defeat of Shuten Dōji brings a time of peace in Japan with renewed imperial authority and additional recognition of the warrior class. From a carnivalesque point of view, the dance is both a dance of death and rebirth.

== Dengaku today ==
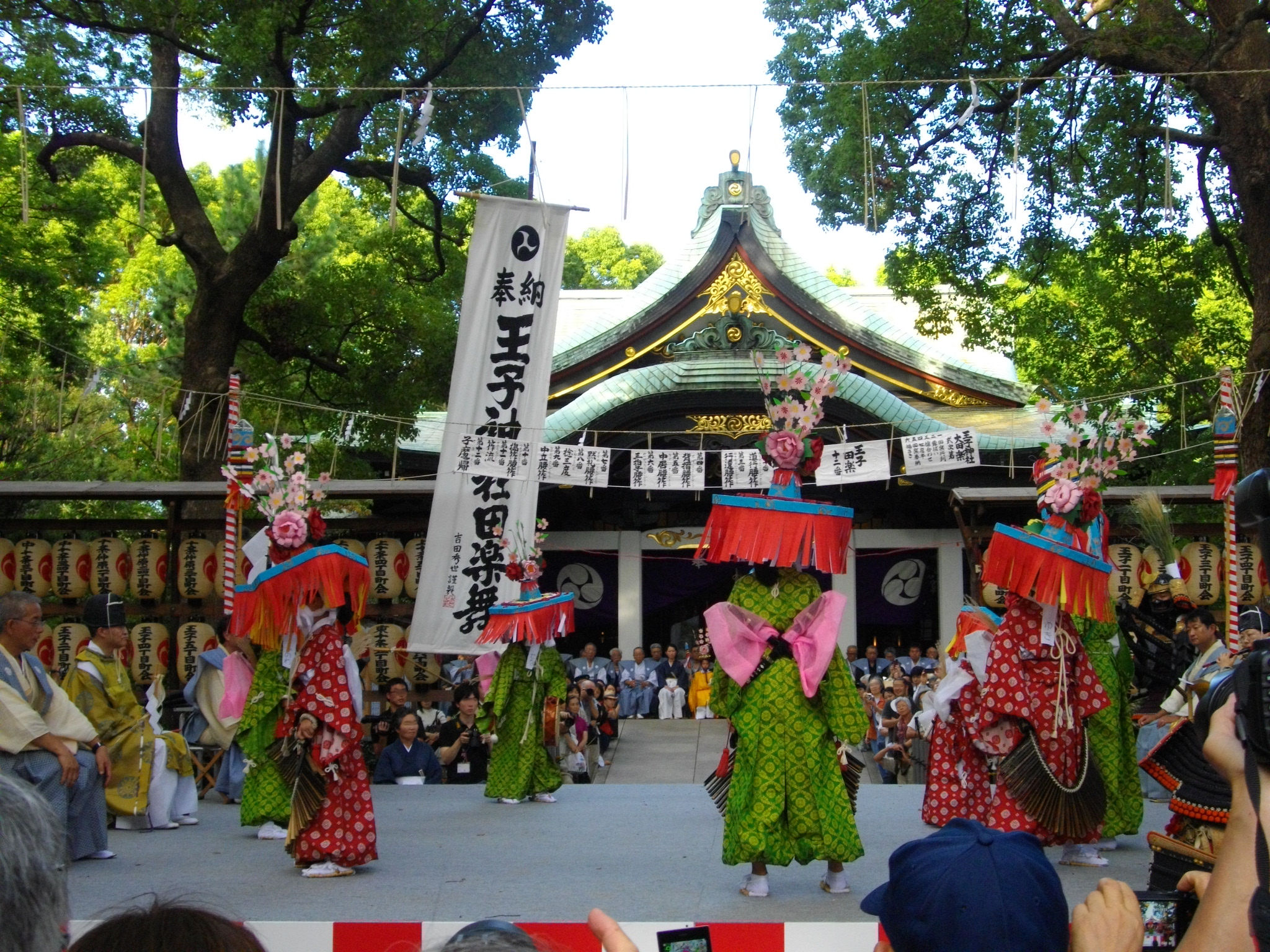
Dengaku in Ōji, Tokyo, 2014.

The Nachi Fire Festival is said to be one of Japan's three largest fire festivals. It is a part of the Kumano Nachi Shrine's annual festival and is officially called Ōgi Matsuri, or Fan Festival. This festival, held annually on July 14, is dedicated to the god in the precincts of Kumano Nachi Shrine.

The company ACT.JT performed a dengaku dance on the terrace of Casa de Vacas in Madrid, Spain with the participation of ten Spanish volunteers in a cultural exchange in 2017. This event was performed within the framework of the Spain-Japan Dual Year events.

== Bibliography ==
- Encyclopædia Britannica 2005 Ultimate Reference Suite DVD, article-"arts, East Asian"
- Encyclopædia Britannica 2005 Ultimate Reference Suite DVD, article-"Kanami"
- Encyclopedia of Shinto, article-"Saru-gaku, Den-gaku"
