= Sarugaku =

Traditional Japanese theatre

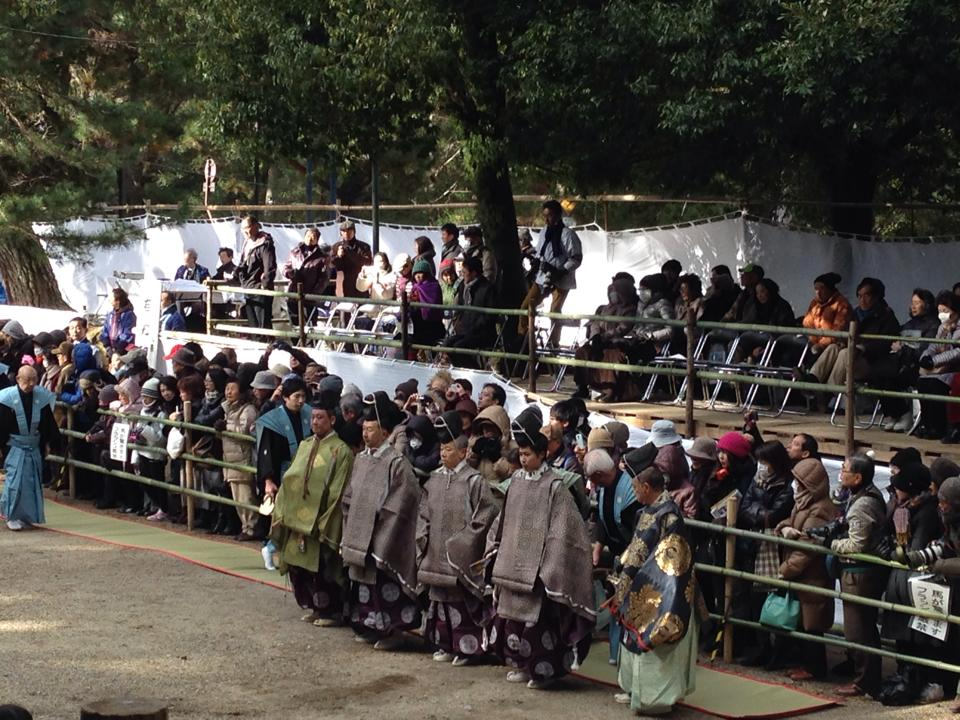
A sarugaku troupe

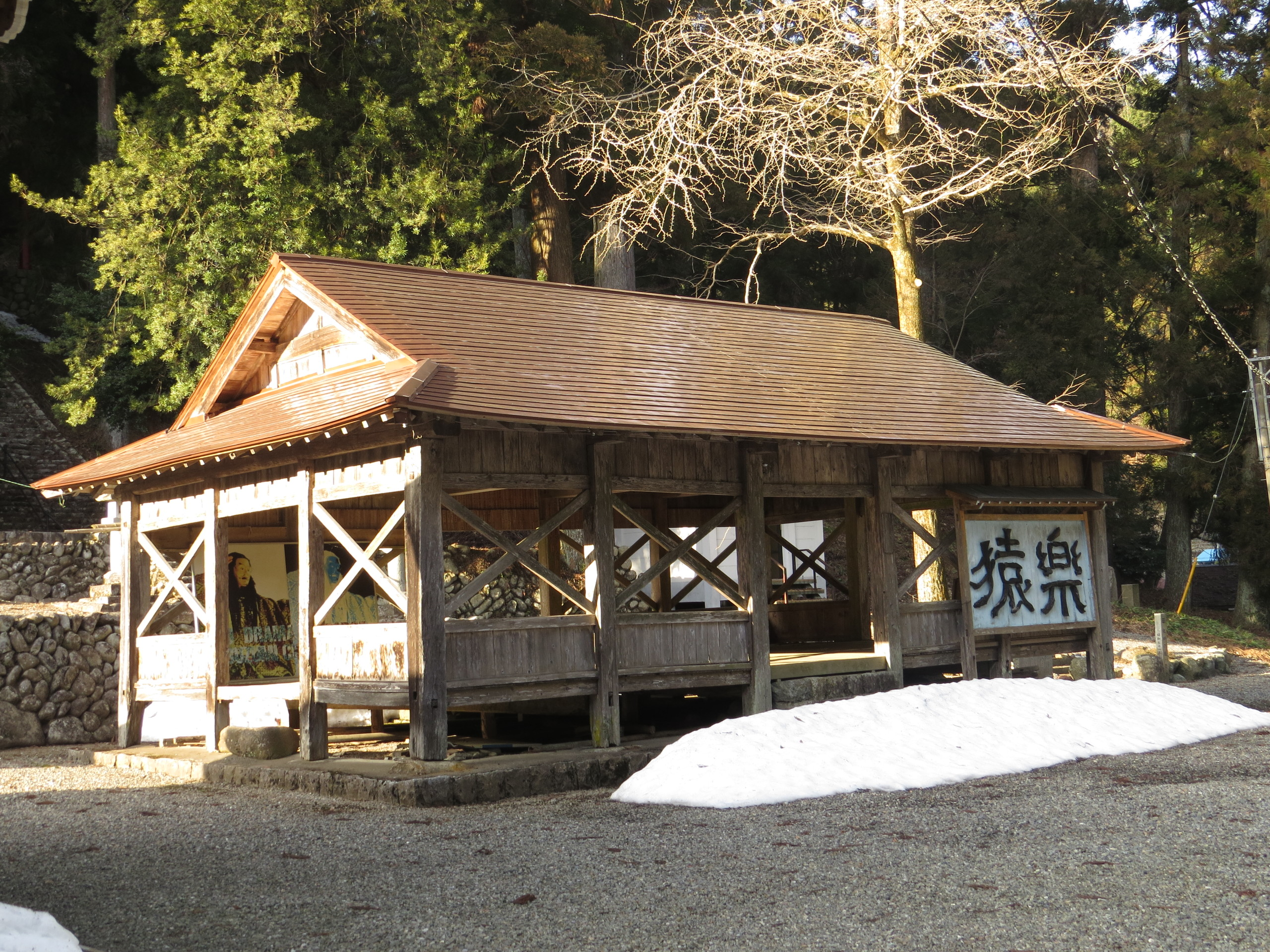
Stage for Sarugaku at Nogohakusan-jinja, Ibigawa, Gifu, Japan

Sarugaku (猿楽; "monkey music") was a form of theatre popular in Japan during the 11th to 14th centuries. One of its predecessors was a sangaku, a form of entertainment reminiscent of the modern-day circus, consisting mostly of acrobatics, juggling, and pantomime, sometimes combined with drum dancing. Sangaku came from China to Japan in the 8th century and there mingled with indigenous traditions, particularly the harvest celebrations of dengaku.

In the 11th century, the form began to favor comic sketches while other elements faded away. By the late 12th century, the term "sarugaku" had come to include comic dialogues based on word play (toben), improvised comic party dances (ranbu), short plays involving several actors, and musical arrangements based on courtesan traditions. During the 13th century, there was increased standardization of words, gestures, musical arrangements, and program combinations; as well as the adoption of the guild (za) system to which all present-day Noh schools can be traced. Kyōgen also developed from sarugaku. Of particular significance is the development of sarugaku troupes in Yamato around Nara and Kyoto during the Kamakura and early Muromachi periods. In particular, the sarugaku Noh troupe Yuzaki, led by Kan'ami, performed in 1374 before the young shōgun Ashikaga Yoshimitsu. The success of this one performance and the resultant shogunal patronage lifted the artform permanently out of the mists of its plebeian past. From then, the term sarugaku gave way to the current nomenclature, Noh.

The Japanese term sarugaku is also used in other contexts to refer to a job or profession that seems to debase the employee or to treat him or her as a source of entertainment rather than as a professional.

According to William Scott Wilson, sarugaku translates to "monkey music", is an ancient form of drama, and is the predecessor to Noh. Takuan Sōhō states as fact that "the emperor's recitation is given like Sarugaku".
