= Kan'ami =

Japanese Noh actor (1333–1384)

Kan'ami Kiyotsugu
- 観阿弥 清次
- Born: Yūzaki Kiyotsugu (結崎 清次); 1333; Iga Province, Japan
- Died: June 8, 1384 (aged 50–51); Suruga Province, Japan
- Other names: Miyomaru (観世丸), Kanze Kiyotsugu (観世 清次)
- Occupations: Noh actor, playwright, musician
- Known for: Development of Noh theatre; incorporation of Kusemai and Dengaku elements
- Notable work: Sotoba Komachi; Ji'nen Koji; Shiino Shōshō; Matsukaze; Motomezuka; Eguchi
- Children: Zeami Motokiyo

Kan'ami Kiyotsugu (観阿弥 清次; 1333 – June 8, 1384) was a Japanese Noh actor, author, and musician during the Muromachi period. Born Yūzaki Kiyotsugu (結崎 清次) in Iga Province, Kan'ami also went by Miyomaru (観世丸) and Kanze Kiyotsugu (観世 清次). He is the father of the well-known playwright Zeami Motokiyo (世阿弥 元清).

== Life ==
Kan'ami's paternal line traced through Iga Province into Yamada troupes. Kan'ami died in Suruga Province.

== Theater ==
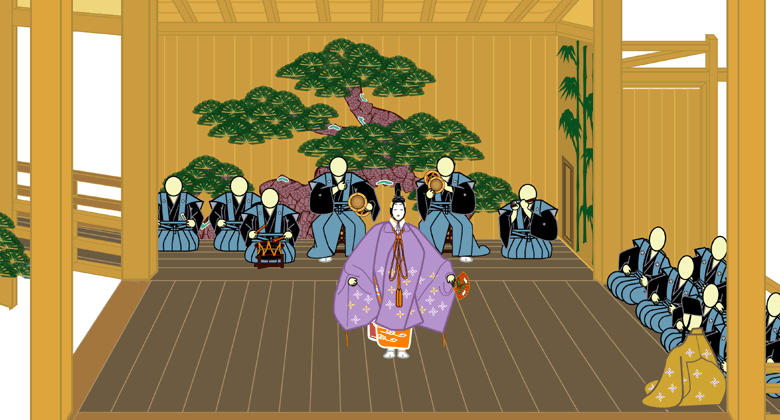
Illustration of positions of players on a Noh stage.

Kan'ami's career began in Obata, Nabari-shi, Mie when he founded a sarugaku theater group in the Kansai region on the main Honshu island. The troupe moved to Yamato and formed the Yuzaki theater company, which would become the school of Noh theater. He grew in popularity and began making trips to Kyoto to give performances. In 1374, the shōgun Ashikaga Yoshimitsu was in the audience of a performance and was so impressed by it that he became Kan'ami's patron.

Kan'ami was the first playwright to incorporate the Kusemai song and dance style and Dengaku dances from rustic harvest celebrations. He trained his son Zeami Motokiyo in his style, and his son eventually succeeded him as director of the Kanze school of Noh.

== Notable works ==
- Sotoba Komachi
- Ji'nen koji
- Shiino shōshō
- Matsukaze
- Motomezuka
- Eguchi
