= List of alternative country names =

Most sovereign states have alternative names. Some countries have also undergone name changes for political or other reasons. Some have special names particular to poetic diction or other contexts. This article attempts to give all known alternative names and initialisms for all nations, countries, and sovereign states, in English and any languages that are predominant or official, or historically significant to the country in question.

Countries are listed alphabetically by their description, the most common name or term that is politically neutral and unambiguous. This may be followed by a note as to the status of the description used.

^{a} = (common, English)

== A ==
Alpha-3 code	Description	Other name(s) or older name(s)
	Abkhazia^{a}	Republic of Abkhazia (official, English), Apsny (official, English) Aphsny Axwynthkharra (official, Abkhaz), Respublika Abkhaziya (official, Russian), Autonomous Republic of Abkhazia (Internationally recognized, English)
AFG	Afghanistan^{a}	Islamic Emirate of Afghanistan (de facto official, English), Da Afġānistān Islāmī Amārāt (de facto official, Pashto), imārāt-i islāmī-yi Afġānistān (de facto official, Dari). From 2004 to 2021, it was known as Islamic Republic of Afghanistan (de jure official, English), Da Afġānistān Islāmī Jumhoryat (de jure official, Pashto), Jumhūrī-yi islāmī-yi Afġānistān (de jure official, Dari). For names of prior states existing in Afghanistan, see History of Afghanistan
ALB	Albania^{a}	Republic of Albania (official, English), Republika e Shqipërisë (official, Albanian), Arnavutluk (Turkish), Arbanon (former, English), People's Socialist Republic of Albania (former official, English), Republika Popullore Socialiste e Shqipërisë (former official, Albanian), Albanian Kingdom (former official, English), Mbretnija Shqiptare (former official, Albanian)
DZA	Algeria^{a}	People's Democratic Republic of Algeria (official, English), al-Jazāʾir (common, Arabic), al-Jumhūriyya al-Jazāʾiriyya ad-Dīmuqrāṭiyya aš‑Šaʿbiyya (official, Arabic), République algérienne démocratique et populaire (official, French)
AND	Andorra^{a}	Principality of Andorra (official, English), Principat d'Andorra (official, Catalan), Principality of the Valleys of Andorra (alternate, English)
AGO	Angola^{a}	Republic of Angola (official, English), República de Angola (official, Portuguese)
ATG	Antigua and Barbuda^{a}	Antigua and Barbuda (official, English), Wadadli (the name the island of Antigua was originally called by Arawaks and is sometimes locally known by today)
ARG	Argentina^{a}	Argentine Republic (official, English), United Provinces of the Rio de la Plata (official, English), Argentine Confederation (official, English), Argentine Nation (official and legally preferred, English), la Argentina (colloquial, Spanish), the Argentine (archaic, English)
ARM	Armenia^{a}	Republic of Armenia (official, English), Hayastan (transliterated Armenian, original: Հայաստան), Հայաստանի Հանրապետություն (official, Armenian), Hayastani Hanrapetut’yun (official, transliterated Armenian)
AUS	Australia^{a}	Commonwealth of Australia (official, English), New Holland (former name, English)
AUT	Austria^{a}	Republic of Austria (official, English), Republik Österreich (official, German), Österreich (common, German), Federal Republic of Austria (former official, English), Cisleithania (former, English), Cisleithanien (former, German)
AZE	Azerbaijan^{a}	Republic of Azerbaijan (official, English), Azərbaycan Respublikası (official, Azerbaijani), Azerbaijan Soviet Socialist Republic (former official, English), Azerbaijan SSR (former short, English), Азәрбајҹан Совет Сосиалист Республикасы (former official, Azerbaijani)

== B ==
Alpha-3 code	Description	Other name(s) or older name(s)
BHS	The Bahamas^{a}	Commonwealth of The Bahamas (official, English), Commonwealth of the Bahama Islands (former official, English), Bahama Islands (colloquial, English)
BHR	Bahrain^{a}	Kingdom of Bahrain (official, English), Mamlakat al-Baḥrayn (official, Arabic), State of Bahrain (former official, English)
BGD	Bangladesh^{a}	People's Republic of Bangladesh (official, English), বাংলাদেশ Bangladesh (common name, meaning the country of Bengal), গণপ্রজাতন্ত্রী বাংলাদেশ Gônôprôjatôntri Bangladesh (long official name in Bengali), বাংলা Bangla (alternative name meaning the geographical land of Bengal), বঙ্গ Bônggô (Bongo, historical name for geographical area of Bengal), গঙ্গাঋদ্ধি Gônggarriddhi (ancient name for Bengal region), Bengal Presidency (former political name), পূর্ববঙ্গ Purbô Bônggô (former political name), East Bengal (former political name), পূর্ব পাকিস্তান Purbô Pakistan (former political name), East Pakistan (former political name)
BRB	Barbados^{a}	Barbados (official, English)
BLR	Belarus^{a}	Republic of Belarus (official, English), Рэспубліка Беларусь Respublika Bielaruś (Belarusian, official), Byelorussia (former name), White Russia (outdated)
BEL	Belgium^{a}	Kingdom of Belgium (official, English), Koninkrijk België (official, Dutch), Royaume de Belgique (official, French), Königreich Belgien (official, German), Belgique (common, French), België (common, Dutch), Belgien (common, German)
BLZ	Belize^{a}	Belize (official, English), British Honduras (former, English)
BEN	Benin^{a}	Republic of Benin (official, English), Dahomey (former name), République du Bénin (official, French)
BTN	Bhutan^{a}	Kingdom of Bhutan (official, English), འབྲུག་རྒྱལ་ཁབ, Druk Gyal Khap (official, Dzongkha)
BOL	Bolivia^{a}	Plurinational State of Bolivia (official, English), Estado Plurinacional de Bolivia (official, Spanish), Republic of Bolívar (former official, English), Republic of Bolivia (former official, English), Republic of Upper Peru (former official, English), Audiencia de Charcas (colonial Spanish), Puliwya (Quechua), Wuliwya (Aymara), Qullasuyu (Quechua)
BIH	Bosnia and Herzegovina^{a}	Bosnia and Herzegovina (official, English), Republic of Bosnia and Herzegovina (former official, English), Socialist Republic of Bosnia and Herzegovina (former official, English), Bosnia (colloquial, English)
BWA	Botswana^{a}	Republic of Botswana (official, English), Bechuanaland (former, English),
BRA	Brazil^{a}	Federative Republic of Brazil (official, English), Pindorama (in Tupi and Guarani, native languages), Terra de Santa Cruz (early Portuguese colonization), Ilha de Vera Cruz (former, Portuguese), Empire of Brazil (former, English), United States of Brazil (former, English), República Federativa do Brasil (official, Portuguese)
BRN	Brunei^{a}	Nation of Brunei, the Abode of Peace (official, English), State of Brunei (colonial name, English), Negara Brunei Darussalam (Malay), Brunei Darussalam (Malay), نڬارا بروني دارالسلام (Jawi)
BGR	Bulgaria^{a}	Republic of Bulgaria (official, English), Република България Republika Bǎlgariya (official, Bulgarian), People's Republic of Bulgaria (former official, English), Bulgaristan (Turkish)
BFA	Burkina Faso^{a}	Burkina Faso (official, English), Upper Volta (former name, English), Haute-Volta (former name, French), Bourkina-Fasso (unofficial French form in the first few days after the 1984 change from Upper Volta until the government clarified the official spelling)
BDI	Burundi^{a}	Republic of Burundi (official, English), Republika y'Uburundi (official, Kirundi), République du Burundi (official, French), Kingdom of Burundi (former official, English)

== C ==
Alpha-3 code	Description	Other name(s) or older name(s)
KHM	Cambodia ^{a}	Kingdom of Cambodia (official, English), Royaume du Cambodge (official, French), Kampuchea (former officially sanctioned common name in the English language and transliteration from Khmer language), Khmer Republic (former official), Democratic Kampuchea (former official), People's Republic of Kampuchea (former official), State of Cambodia (former official)
CMR	Cameroon ^{a}	Republic of Cameroon (official, English), United Republic of Cameroon (former official, English), Kamerun (former colonial, German)
CAN	Canada^{a}	Canada (official, English and French), Dominion of Canada (historical long form, English), Dominion du Canada (historical long form, French), Acadia (French colony)
CPV	Cape Verde^{a}	Republic of Cabo Verde (official, English), República de Cabo Verde (official, Portuguese), Repúblika di Kabu Verdi (official, Cape Verdean Creole), Cabo Verde (official, Portuguese and English; the Government of Cabo Verde now uses that form for official purposes in English as well as Portuguese)
CAF	Central African Republic^{a}	Central African Republic (official, English), Oubangui-Chari (former, French), Ubangi-Shari (English), République Centrafricaine (official, French), Empire Centrafricain (former official, French), Central African Empire (English)
TCD	Chad (official, English)	Republic of Chad (official, English), République du Tchad (official, French), Jumhūrīyat Tashād (official, Arabic)
CHL	Chile^{a}	Republic of Chile (official, English), Chilli (Mapuche), Chili (Quechua), Reino de Chile (colonial Spanish), Capitania general de Chile (colonial Spanish)
CHN	People's Republic of China (official, English)	People's Republic of China (official, English), 中华人民共和国 (Zhōnghuá rénmín gònghéguó), PRC (initialism), China 中国 (Zhōngguó) (common, ambiguous), Communist China (colloquial, mainly used by Western countries), Red China (colloquial, mainly derogatory), 中共 (Zhōnggòng) (colloquial and mainly derogatory, mainly used by the ROC with a cognate used in Vietnam), Mainland China / 中国大陆 (Zhōngguó dàlù) / 中国內地 (Zhōngguó nèidì) (colloquial, refers to the area that the PRC Government administers since the end of the Chinese Civil War), New China/新中国 (Xīn Zhōngguó) (colloquial, pro-Communist), Shenzhou/神州, Ch'in Empire, Cathay (obsolete, now mainly used poetically), the Middle Kingdom (colloquial, loose translation of the common endonym), Sina (Latin name, often used in adjective compounds) Zhongguo is the name for China in Chinese language. CN (alpha-2 code)
COL	Colombia^{a}	Republic of Colombia (official, English), República de Colombia (official, Spanish), Estados Unidos de Colombia (former official, Spanish), Confederación Granadina (former official, Spanish), República de la Nueva Granada (former official, Spanish)
COM	Comoros^{a}	Union of the Comoros (official, English), Union des Comores (official, French), Udzima wa Komori (official, Swahili), al-Ittiḥād al-Qumurī (official, Arabic), United Republic of the Comoros (official, English)
COG	Congo^{a}	Republic of the Congo (official, English), Congo-Brazzaville ^{a}, Congo Republic ^{a}, République du Congo (official, French), Repubilika ya Kôngo (official, Kituba), Republíki ya Kongó (official, Lingala)
COD	Democratic Republic of the Congo^{a}	Zaire (former official name, 1971 to 1997; still occasionally used to distinguish it from Republic of the Congo), DRC (initialism), Congo Kinshasa (used in contrast to "Congo Brazzaville"), Belgian Congo (former name during Belgian colonization, 1908 to 1960, English), Congo belge (former name, French), Congo Free State (former name, 1885 to 1908), Republic of the Congo (former name, 1960 to 1964, during which time both Congos had identical official names)
CRI	Costa Rica^{a}	Republic of Costa Rica (official, English), República de Costa Rica (official, Spanish), Tiquicia (nickname)
HRV	Croatia ^{a}	Republic of Croatia (official, English), Republika Hrvatska (official, Croatian), Hrvatska (common, Croatian; also in Serbian, Bosnian and Montenegrin), Hrvaška (Slovenian), Hırvatistan (Turkish)
CUB	Cuba^{a}	Republic of Cuba (official, English), República de Cuba (official, Spanish)
CYP	Cyprus^{a}	Republic of Cyprus (official, English), Κυπριακή Δημοκρατία (official, Greek), Kypriaki Dimokratia (official, transliterated Greek), Kıbrıs Cumhuriyeti (official, Turkish), Κύπρος (common, Greek), Kypros (common, transliterated Greek), Kıbrıs (common, Turkish), Island of Venus (nickname, English)
CZE	Czech Republic ^{a}	Czechia (official shortform name, English), Česká republika (official, Czech, Slovak), Česko (common, Czech, Slovak), ČR (Czech initialism), CR (English initialism), Bohemia (former, English), Czechland (unofficial, English), the Czechlands (unofficial, English), České země (Czech for "Bohemian lands" or "Czech lands"). Former Česká socialistická republika (Czech for the "Czech Socialist Republic"), ČSR (Czech initialism), CSR (English initialism), (Protektorát) Čechy a Morava (Czech for the "(Protectorate of) Bohemia and Moravia"), Země Koruny české (Czech for the "Lands of the Bohemian Crown"), Koruna česká (Czech for the "Bohemian Crown"), Česká konfederace (Czech for the "Bohemian Confederation")

== D ==
Alpha-3 code	Description	Other name(s) or older name(s)
DNK	Denmark^{a}	Kingdom of Denmark (official, English), Danmark (common, Danish, Swedish, Norwegian), Kongeriget Danmark (official, Danish), Dania (antiquated, Latin)
DJI	Djibouti^{a}	Republic of Djibouti (official, English), French Territory of the Afars and the Issas, French Somaliland, Obock Territory (former names, English), Territoire français des Afars et des Issas, Côte française des Somalis, Territoire d'Obock (former names, French), République de Djibouti (official, French)
DMA	Dominica^{a}	Commonwealth of Dominica (official, English), Dominique (common, French), Dominik (common, Dominican Creole French), Wai‘tu kubuli (common, Kalinago language)
DOM	Dominican Republic^{a}	Dominican Republic (official, English), República Dominicana (Spanish), Quisqueya (common, Taíno)

== E ==
Alpha-3 code	Description	Other name(s) or older name(s)
ECU	Ecuador ^{a}	Republic of Ecuador (official, English), República del Ecuador (official Spanish), Ikwadur Ripuwlika (Quechua), Ekuatur Nunka (Shuar)
EGY	Egypt^{a}	Arab Republic of Egypt (official, English), Miṣr (formal shortened, Arabic), Meṣr (common, Arabic), Aegyptus (former, Greek/Latin), Kīmi (Coptic), Rahab (Poetic, Hebrew), Kemet (former, Ancient Egyptian), Ægypt (archaic)
SLV	El Salvador^{a}	Republic of El Salvador (official, English), República de El Salvador (official, Spanish)
GNQ	Equatorial Guinea^{a}	Republic of Equatorial Guinea (official, English), República de Guinea Ecuatorial (official, Spanish), République de Guinée équatoriale (official, French), República da Guiné Equatorial (official, Portuguese), Guinea Ecuatorial (common, Spanish), Guinée équatoriale (common, French), Guiné Equatorial (common, Portuguese)
ERI	Eritrea^{a}	State of Eritrea (official, English), Italian Eritrea (former, English)
EST	Estonia^{a}	Republic of Estonia (official, English), Esthonia (archaic, English), Eesti (common, Estonian), Eesti Vabariik (official, Estonian), Viru (poetic, Estonian), Viro (common, Finnish), Estland (common, German, Swedish, Danish, Norwegian, Dutch), Maarjamaa (Terra Mariana poetic, Estonian), Igaunija (common, Latvian)
SWZ	Eswatini ^{a}	Kingdom of Eswatini (official, English), Swaziland (common, former), eSwatini (Swazi),
ETH	Ethiopia^{a}	Federal Democratic Republic of Ethiopia (official, English), ኢትዮጵያ (ītiyop’iya) (Amharic), Abyssinia (former), Etiopia (Italian), Habeşistan (Turkish), Ethiopië (common, Dutch), Al-Habasha (Arabic), Æthiopia (archaic)

== F ==
Alpha-3 code	Description	Other name(s) or older name(s)
FJI	Fiji^{a}	Republic of Fiji (official, English), Matanitu Tugalala o Viti (official, Fijian)
FIN	Finland (common, English and Swedish)	Republic of Finland (official, English), Suomi (common, Finnish), Suomen tasavalta (official, Finnish), Republiken Finland (official, Swedish), Suomenmaa (poetic, Finnish), Suopma and Suoma dásseváldi (North Sami, official), Lääˊddjânnam and Lääˊddjânnam tääˊssväˊldd (Skolt Sami, official), Suomâ and Suomâ täsiväldi (official, Inari Sami), Финля́ндия (Finlyandiya) and Великое княжество Финляндское (Velikoye knyazhestvo Finlyandskoye) (Russian, as Grand Duchy of Finland), Soome (common, Estonian)
FRA	France (common, English and French)	French Republic (official, English), République française (official, French), L'Hexagone (often journalistic, colloquial French), Gaul (former name, English), Gaule (former name, French), Γαλλία (Gallia) (Contemporary Greek and Latin name), Frankreich (common German), Francia (common Italian), Farança (common Arabic), Tsarfat (common Hebrew)

== G ==
Alpha-3 code	Description	Other name(s) or older name(s)
GAB	Gabon^{a}	Gabonese Republic (official, English)
GMB	The Gambia^{a}	Republic of The Gambia (official, English)
GEO	Georgia^{a}	Georgia (official, English), Sakartvelo (transliterated Georgian, original: საქართველო), Iberia (former, English, East Georgia), Colchis (former, English, West Georgia), Iveria (usually used as Christian name), Republic of Georgia (former, English, before the 1995 Constitution), საქართველოს რესპუბლიკა (former, Georgian), Sakartvelos Respublika (former, transliterated Georgian), گرجستان (Gorjestan) (Persian), Gürcistan (Turkish)
DEU	Germany^{a}	Federal Republic of Germany (official, English), Bundesrepublik Deutschland (official, German*), Deutschland (common, German*), BRD (German initialism*), FRG (English initialism*) [along with the common English "Germany," the names marked with an asterisk formerly referred only to West Germany, but following German reunification now apply to the united country], German Empire (former, 1871–1918), Weimar Republic (former, 1918–1933). Duitsland (common, Dutch), Allemagne (common, French), Alemania (common, Spanish), Germania (common, Italian, Latin name), Německo (common, Czech), Vācija (Official, Latvian), Niemcy (common, Polish), Németország (common, Hungarian) [the common name for Germany in some Romance languages is a variant of the place name Alemannia and in many Slavic languages is a variant of Nemacia (old Slavic for outsiders, literally "those who cannot speak our language"). Other languages use pars pro toto names such as Bavaria or the former Prussia to refer to Germany, for instance Saksa (common, Finnish), derived from the place name Saxony]. Former East Germany (unofficial, English): Deutsche Demokratische Republik (official, German), German Democratic Republic (official, English), DDR (German initialism), GDR (English initialism).
GHA	Ghana^{a}	Republic of Ghana (official, English), Gold Coast (colonial, English), United Gold Coast Convention (UGCC), Ghana Tiŋzuɣu (Dagbon), Gaana (Akan)
GRC	Greece^{a}	Hellenic Republic (official, English), Hellas (official and common name), Ελλάδα ("Hellada" common name in Greek), Ελλάς ("Hellas" official description in Greek), Yunanistan (Turkish), Ελληνική Δημοκρατία (official name of Greek state, Greek), Kingdom of the Hellenes (1863–1924 and 1935–1967), Yavan (common Hebrew), Graecia (Latin name)
GRD	Grenada^{a}	Grenada (official, English), Gwenad (common, Grenadian Creole French)
GTM	Guatemala ^{a}	Republic of Guatemala (official, English), República de Guatemala (official, Spanish), Ixim Ulew, Iximulew (Kaqchikel and Kʼicheʼ), Paxil Kayalaʼ (Kʼicheʼ), Twitz Paxil (Mam)
GIN	Guinea ^{a}	Republic of Guinea (official, English), République de Guinée (official, French), Gine (Mandinka), ߖߌ߬ߣߍ߫ (N'Ko script), Republik bu Gine (Fula), 𞤈𞤫𞤨𞤵𞤦𞤤𞤭𞤳 𞤦𞤵 𞤘𞤭𞤲𞤫 (Adlam Script), French Guinea (former, English), Guinée française (former French), Guinea-Conakry (sometimes referred, English)
GNB	Guinea-Bissau^{a}	República da Guiné-Bissau (official, Portuguese), Republic of Guinea-Bissau (official, English), Guiné Portuguesa (former, Portuguese) Portuguese Guinea (former, English), Guiné-Bissao (archaic, Portuguese), Guinea (shorthand, used when context clearly distinguishes Guinea-Bissau from the neighboring Republic of Guinea)
GUY	Guyana ^{a}	Co‑operative Republic of Guyana (official, English), British Guiana (former, English)

== H ==
Alpha-3 code	Description	Other name(s) or older name(s)
HTI	Haiti^{a}	Republic of Haiti (official, English), République d'Haïti (official, French), Repiblik d Ayiti (Haitian Creole), Haïti (French), Ayiti (Haitian Creole), Hayti (former, English)
HND	Honduras^{a}	Republic of Honduras (official, English), República de Honduras (official, Spanish)
HUN	Hungary^{a}	Hungary (official, English), Republic of Hungary (official between 1946–1949 and 1989–2012), Hungarian People's Republic (official, 1918–1919 and 1949–1989), Kingdom of Hungary (1000–1918 and 1920–1946), Regnum Marianum (Latin for "Kingdom of Mary," poetic medieval name), Regnum Hungariæ (official in Latin, the language of administration until 1844), Hungaria (short form, Latin), Magyarország (official Hungarian name; has been the commonly used form of the name during all its history), Magyar Köztársaság (Hungarian for "Republic of Hungary"), Magyar Népköztársaság (Hungarian for "People's Republic of Hungary"), Magyar Tanácsköztársaság (Hungarian name of the first People's Republic), Magyar Királyság (Hungarian for "Kingdom of Hungary"), Pannonia (Latin, poetic, after the Roman province), Macaristan (Turkish)

== I ==
Alpha-3 code	Description	Other name(s) or older name(s)
ISL	Iceland^{a}	Republic of Iceland (official, English), Ísland (official Icelandic name), Lýðveldið Ísland (official Icelandic description), Fold (poetic name), Thule (Latin name, also poetic), Frón, Ísafold (both poetic)
IND	India^{a}	Republic of India (official, English), Bhārat Gaṇarājya (official, Hindi), Hindustan (common, Hindustani), Union of India (in legal proceedings), Sindhu (historical, poetic, Sanskrit). Bharat (Hindi) was officially adopted as an alternative name in 1949.
IDN	Indonesia ^{a}	Republic of Indonesia (official, English), Unitary State of the Republic of Indonesia (alternative official, English), Republik Indonesia (official, Indonesian), Negara Kesatuan Republik Indonesia (colloquial, Indonesian), Nusantara (dating back from Hindu era), Insulinde (from the Colonial era), Indunesia (suggestion for Dutch East Indies' modern name), Indonesië (common, Dutch), Dutch East Indies or Netherlands East-Indies (former, English), Nederlands(ch)-Indië (former, Dutch), Hindia Belanda (former, Indonesian)
IRN	Iran ^{a}	Islamic Republic of Iran (official, English), Persia was coined by ancient Greeks referring to Iran, which has always been the local name. Use of the Greek name continued in the west until 1935, when upon Iran's request, the local name of Iran became the internationally legal name, replacing Persia. Though both still remain in use today, outside of legal sphere, IRI, I.R.I., I.R.I (English initialism)
IRQ	Iraq ^{a}	Republic of Iraq (official, English), Mesopotamia (former name), Assyria (former/historical name), Babylon (former/historical name), Ba'athist Iraq (former common name from 1968 to 2003 ruled by the Arab Socialist Ba'ath Party – Iraq Region), Saddamist Iraq (alternative historical name, ruled by former president Saddam Hussein from 1979 to 2003), Saddamist regime (alternative historical name)
IRL	Ireland (common and official, English)	Ireland (official, English), Éire (official Irish name), Irish Free State (1922–1937), Poblacht na hÉireann (official Irish description), Republic of Ireland (official English description), Saorstát Éireann (Irish 1922–1937), Erin, Banba, Fodla (three poetic names), Hibernia (Latin name, also poetic, often used in adjectives and adjective compounds)
ISR	Israel ^{a}	State of Israel (official, English), מדינת ישראל (Medinat Yisra'el) (official Hebrew name), دَوْلَة إِسْرَائِيل (Dawlat Isra'il) (official Arabic name), Zion (historical Jewish name for Jerusalem), the Jewish State (unofficial), the Holy Land (ארץ הקודש) / Eretz Yisrael (ארץ ישראל) (Bible), the Zionist entity (derogatory), Jeshurun (poetic, ancient)
ITA	Italy ^{a}	Italian Republic (official, English), Repubblica Italiana (official Italian name), Italia (common, Italian), Kingdom of Italy (1861–1946), the Beautiful Country (nickname), the Boot (journalistic), Ausonia, Esperia, Enotria, Tirrenia (poetic names)
CIV	Ivory Coast ^{a}, (common English)	Côte d'Ivoire (common, French and English), Republic of Côte d'Ivoire (official, English), République de Côte d'Ivoire (official, French)

== J ==
Alpha-3 code	Description	Other name(s) or older name(s)
JAM	Jamaica ^{a}	Jamaica (official, English), Xamayca (Spanish version of Taino name)
JPN	Japan ^{a}	Nippon (official, English), (日本) (official, Japanese), Nihon (alternate, more common reading of 日本 in Japanese), Yamato (大和) or Wa (倭) (historic, ancient Japan, derogatory), Ōyashima (大八洲) (meaning the country of eight great islands, historic), Cipangu/Zipangu or Gipangu (appeared in The Travels of Marco Polo in the 13th century), Hinomoto, JP (alpha-2 code), Iaponica/Japonica (Latin name, often used in adjectives and adjective compounds), Land of the Rising Sun (poetic, loose translation of the endonym)
JOR	Jordan ^{a}	Hashemite Kingdom of Jordan (official, English), HKJ (initialism, used on vehicles)

== K ==
Alpha-3 code	Description	Other name(s) or older name(s)
KAZ	Kazakhstan^{a}	Republic of Kazakhstan (official, English), Kazakhstan (English passport short name), Republic of Kazakhstan (English passport long name), Қазақстан (official Kazakh short name), Қазақстан Республикасы (official Kazakh long name), Qazaqstan (Kazakh short name in Latin script), Alash / Алаш / Alaş (former name, also poetic), Kazakh Soviet Socialist Republic (former Soviet name, English), Қазақ Кеңестік Социалистік Республикасы/Qazaq Keñestik Socïalïstik Respwblïkası (former Soviet name, Kazakh), Казахская Советская Социалистическая Республика, Kazakhskaya Sovetskaya Sotsialisticheskaya Respublika (former Soviet name, Russian)
KEN	Kenya^{a}	Republic of Kenya (official, English), Jamhuri ya Kenya (official, Swahili), British East Africa Protectorate (former name when held in ‘protectorate’ status prior to becoming a colony starting in the 1880s until 1920), Kenya Colony (former name during British colonization, from the 1920 until 1963)
KIR	Kiribati^{a}	Republic of Kiribati (official, English), Ribaberiki ni Kiribati (official, Gilbertese), Gilbert Islands (former official, English), Kingsmill Group (former, English)
PRK	North Korea^{a}	Democratic People's Republic of Korea (official, English), D.P.R.K., DPRK (initialism, English), Choson Minjujuui Inmin Konghwaguk (조선민주주의인민공화국) (official, Korean), Choson (조선) (colloquial, Korean), Bukhoe (북괴) (South Korea, derogatory), DPR Korea, Korea (conventional short form)
KOR	South Korea^{a}	Republic of Korea (official, English), R.O.K., ROK (initialism, English), Daehanminguk (대한민국) (official, Korean), Hanguk (한국) (colloquial, Korean), Korea (conventional short form), Namjosŏn (남조선) (North Korea, historical), Korea Republic (FIFA designation)
	Kosovo^{a}	Republic of Kosovo (official, English), Republika e Kosovës (official, Albanian), Republika Kosovo (official, Serbian Latin), Република Косово (official, Serbian Cyrillic), Kossovo (archaic, English)
KWT	Kuwait^{a}	State of Kuwait (official, English), دولة الكويت (official, Arabic), Dawlat al-Kuwait (romanized, Arabic) الكويت (common, Arabic), al-Kuwait (romanized, Arabic)
KGZ	Kyrgyzstan^{a}	Kyrgyz Republic (official, English), Кыргызстан (official Kyrgyz short name), Кыргыз Республикасы (official Kyrgyz long name), Kyrgyz Respublikasy (Kyrgyz short name in Latin script), Кыргызстан (official Russian short name), Кыргызская Республика (official Russian long name), Kyrgyzskaya Respublika (Russian short name in Latin script), Kirghiz Soviet Socialist Republic (former Soviet name, English), Кыргыз Советтик Социалисттик Республикасы/Kyrgyz Sovettik Sotsialisttik Respublikasy (former Soviet name, Kyrgyz), Киргизская Советская Социалистическая Республика/Kirgizskaya Sovetskaya Sotsialisticheskaya Respublika (former Soviet name, Russian), Kirghizia (former common English name prior to 1991), Kirgizstan (Russian transliteration of the English name), Republic of Kyrgyzstan (official English long name, 1990–1993)

== L ==
Alpha-3 code	Description	Other name(s) or older name(s)
LAO	Laos^{a}	Lao People's Democratic Republic (official, English), ສາທາລະນະລັດ ປະຊາທິປະໄຕ ປະຊາຊົນລາວ (official Lao), Sathalanalat Paxathipatai Paxaxôn (romanized Lao), République démocratique populaire lao (French), Lao / ລາວ (alternate)
LVA	Latvia^{a}	Republic of Latvia (official, English), Latvijas Republika (official, Latvian), Latvija (common, Latvian), Lettland (German, Swedish), Letland (Dutch, Danish), Letonija (Serbian), Lettonie (French)
LBN	Lebanon^{a}	The Lebanese Republic (official, English), Al-Jumhuriyya Al-Lubnaniyya (official, Arabic), Lebnan (Common, Arabic), Lubnan (Common, Arabic), Liban (Common, French), Levanon (Common, Hebrew), Libanus (Latin name)
LSO	Lesotho^{a}	Kingdom of Lesotho (official, English), Basutoland (former, English)
LBR	Liberia^{a}	Republic of Liberia (official, English)
LBY	Libya^{a}	State of Libya (official, English), دولة ليبيا (Arabic), Dawlat Lībiyā (romanized), United Libyan Kingdom (former, English), Kingdom of Libya (former, English), Libyan Arab Republic (former, English), Socialist People's Libyan Arab Jamahiriya (former, official English), Great Socialist People's Libyan Arab Jamahiriya (former, official English)
LIE	Liechtenstein^{a}	Principality of Liechtenstein (official, English), Fürstentum Liechtenstein (official, German)
LTU	Lithuania^{a}	Republic of Lithuania (official, English), Lietuvos Respublika (official, Lithuanian), Lietuva (common, Lithuanian), Литва (Litva) (common, Russian/Slavic), Lita (common, Yiddish/Hebrew)
LUX	Luxembourg ^{a}	Grand Duchy of Luxembourg (official, English), Groussherzogdem Lëtzebuerg (official, Luxembourgish), Lëtzebuerg (common, Luxembourgish), Grand-Duché de Luxembourg (official, French), Luxembourg (common, French), Großherzogtum Luxemburg (official, German), Luxemburg (common, German), Luxemburgo (common, Spanish & Portuguese), Lussemburgo (common, Italian)

== M ==
Alpha-3 code	Description	Other name(s) or older name(s)
MDG	Madagascar ^{a}	Republic of Madagascar (official, English), Madagasikara (Malagasy), Repoblikan'i Madagasikara (official, Malagasy), République de Madagascar (official, French)
MWI	Malawi ^{a}	Republic of Malawi (official, English), Nyasaland (former, English),
MYS	Malaysia ^{a}	Malaysia (official, English), Persekutuan Malaysia (colloquial long form, Malay), Federation of Malaysia (colloquial long form, English), Malaya, Sabah and Sarawak (former, English names of the various components), Tanah Melayu or Malay Land (former, Malay), 马来西亚/ Mǎláixīyà (common, Mandarin), மலேசியா/ Malēciya (common, Tamil)
MDV	Maldives ^{a}	Republic of Maldives (official, English), ދިވެހިރާއްޖޭގެ ޖުމްހޫރިއްޔާ/ Dhivehi Raajjeyge Jumhooriyyaa (official, Dhivehi), The Maldive Islands (colloquial, colonial), Mahal Dvipa or मालदीव/ Maléldvipa (ancient, Sanskrit), الدولة المحلديبية/ ad-dawlat al-mahal dībīyāt (ancient, Arabic)
MLI	Mali ^{a}	Republic of Mali (official, English), République du Mali (official, French), Mali ka Fasojamana (romanticized, Bambara), ߡߊߟߌ ߞߊ ߝߊߛߏߖߊߡߊߣߊ (Bambara), Renndaandi Maali (Fula)
MLT	Malta (common, English and Maltese)	Republic of Malta (official, English), Repubblica ta' Malta (official, Maltese), Melita (ancient)
MHL	Marshall Islands ^{a}	Republic of the Marshall Islands (official, English), Aolepān Aorōkin Ṃajeḷ (official, Marshallese)
MRT	Mauritania ^{a}	Islamic Republic of Mauritania (official, English), République Islamique de Mauritanie (official, French)
MUS	Mauritius ^{a}	Republic of Mauritius (official, English), République de Maurice (official, French), Repiblik Moris (official, Mauritian Creole)
MEX	Mexico ^{a}	United Mexican States (official, English), Estados Unidos Mexicanos (official, Spanish), México (Spanish short form), República Mexicana (used in Mexico, colloquial, Spanish), Méjico (Spanish variant), MEX (initialism), MX (initialism), Aztlán or Aztlān (Poetic, Spanish, Nahuatl), Mēxihko (Nahuatl), Meejikoo (Yucatec Maya)
FSM	Micronesia ^{a}	Federated States of Micronesia (official, English), FSM (abbreviated, English)
MDA	Moldova ^{a}	Republic of Moldova (official, English), Republica Moldova (official, Moldovan and Romanian), Moldavian Soviet Socialist Republic (former Soviet name, English), Република Советикэ Сочиалистэ Молдовеняскэ (former Soviet name, Moldovan), Bessarabia, Bassarabia (historic name, still used by irredentists), Boğdan ('Land of Voyvoda I. Bogdan', former common and official name during Ottoman Empire, Turkish), Moldavia (alternative name in English), Moldau (alternative name in German)
MCO	Monaco ^{a}	Principality of Monaco (official, English), Principauté de Monaco (official, French), Principatu de Mùnegu (official, Ligurian), Principato di Monaco (official, Italian), Principat de Mónegue (official, Occitan)
MNG	Mongolia ^{a}	Mongolia (official, English), Монгол Улс (official, Mongolian), Mongol Uls (transcribed, English)
MNE	Montenegro ^{a}	Montenegro (official, English), Crna Gora (official, Montenegrin, Serbian and Croatian), Republic of Montenegro (official until 2007), Republika Crna Gora (official until 2007), Mali i Zi (official, Albanian), Karadag (official, Turkish), Duklja (name in medieval times), Zeta (alternative name in medieval times), Black Mountain (literal translation into English)
MAR	Morocco ^{a}	Kingdom of Morocco (official, English), Al Mamlaka Al Maghribiya (official, Arabic) means The Far west kingdom, Commonly known as Maghreb (The Sunset Country, English)
MOZ	Mozambique ^{a}	Republic of Mozambique (official, English), Moçambique or República de Moçambique (official, Portuguese), Mozambiki (Chichewa), Msumbiji (Swahili), Muzambhiki (Tsonga)
MMR	Myanmar ^{a}	Republic of the Union of Myanmar (official, English), Burma (former), ပြည်ထောင်စု သမ္မတ မြန်မာနိုင်ငံတော်‌ (Pyidaunzu Thanmăda Myăma Nainngandaw) (Burmese)

== N ==
Alpha-3 code	Description	Other name(s) or older name(s)
NAM	Namibia^{a}	Republic of Namibia (official, English), German South-West Africa (former, English), Deutsch-Südwestafrika (former, German)
NRU	Nauru^{a}	Republic of Nauru (official, English), Repubrikin Naoero (official, Nauruan), Pleasant Island ^{a}
NPL	Nepal^{a}	Federal Democratic Republic Of Nepal (official, English), संघिय लोकतान्त्रिक गणतन्त्र नेपाल saṃghiya lokatāntrika gaṇatantra nepāla (official, Nepalese), Kingdom of Nepal (former, English)
NLD	Netherlands ^{a}	Kingdom of the Netherlands (official, English), Koninkrijk der Nederlanden (official, Dutch), Nederland (Dutch), Holland (pars pro toto, English, Dutch and other languages), Batavia (former and poetic, English, Dutch and other languages), Pays-Bas (French, used alongside "Netherlands" as names in the two official languages of the Int'l Olympic Committee)
NZL	New Zealand ^{a}	New Zealand (official, English), Aotearoa (official, Maori), Realm of New Zealand (official English name including Cook Islands, Niue, Tokelau, and Ross Dependency), Dominion of New Zealand (former official, English)
NIC	Nicaragua (official, English)	Republic of Nicaragua (official, English), República de Nicaragua (official Spanish)
NER	Niger ^{a}	Republic of the Niger (official, English), The Niger ^{a}, République du Niger (official, French)
NGA	Nigeria ^{a}	Federal Republic of Nigeria (official, English), Orílẹ̀-èdè Olómìniira Àpapọ̀ Nàìjíríà (Yoruba), Jamhuriyar Taraiyar Najeriya (Hausa), Ọ̀hàńjíkọ̀ Ọ̀hànézè Naìjíríyà (Igbo)
MKD	North Macedonia^{a}	Republic of North Macedonia (official, English), (Republic of) Macedonia (former), (Република) Северна Македонија (Macedonian), Македонија (former short form, Macedonian), The former Yugoslav Republic of Macedonia, FYROM (former), Paeonia (Latin name, poetic), Vardar Banovina (former Yugoslav province)
NOR	Norway^{a}	Norge (common, Norwegian Bokmål, Danish, Swedish), Noreg (common, Norwegian Nynorsk), Norga (common, Northern Sami), Vuodna (common, Lule Sami), Nöörje (common, Southern Sami), Norja (common, Kven language), Kingdom of Norway (official, English), Kongeriket Norge (official, Norwegian Bokmål), Kongeriket Noreg (official, Norwegian Nynorsk), Norgga gonagasriika (official, Northern Sami), Vuona gånågisrijkka (official, Lule Sami), Nöörjen gånkarïjhke (official, Southern Sami) and Norjan kuninkhaanvaltakunta (official, Kven).

== O ==
Alpha-3 code	Description	Other name(s) or older name(s)
OMN	Oman ^{a}	Sultanate of Oman (official, English)

== P ==
Alpha-3 code	Description	Other name(s) or older name(s)
PAK	Pakistan^{a}	Islamic Republic of Pakistan (official, English), Federation of Pakistan (alternate official name, English), Dominion of Pakistan (historic official name, English), West Pakistan (common and later official name for the area now covering Pakistan, used when discussing the polity before the secession of East Bengal/Bangladesh)
PLW	Palau^{a}	Republic of Palau (official, English), Belau (common, Palauan; was also sometimes used by English speakers who supported Palauan independence before it was gained in 1994)
PSE	Palestine ^{a}	State of Palestine (official, English), מדינת פָּלֶשְׂתִּינָה (Medinat Pālēśtīnā) (Hebrew name), دَوْلَة فلسطين (Dawlat Filasṭīn) (official Arabic name), the Holy Land (ארץ הקודש, الأرض المقدسة) / Eretz Yisrael (ארץ ישראל) (Bible), فلسطين (Filasṭīn) (common name, Arabic), פָּלֶשְׂתִּינָה (Pālēśtīnā) (common name, Hebrew), Palestinian National Authority (English name, alternate official), السلطة الفلسطينية (as-Sulṭa al-Filasṭīnīya) (Arabic name, alternate official), West Bank and Gaza Strip (territorial names), Palestinian territories (official name, English), الأراضي الفلسطينية (al-Arāḍī al-Filasṭīniyya) (official name, Arabic), Occupied Palestinian Territory / Occupied Palestinian Territories (International designation, English), Israeli-occupied territories (name of the territories occupied by Israel since 1967, English), Mandatory Palestine (former name, English)
PAN	Panama ^{a}	Republic of Panama (official, English), República de Panamá (official, Spanish)
PNG	Papua New Guinea ^{a}	Independent State of Papua New Guinea (official, English), Independen Stet bilong Papua Niugini (Tok Pisin), Independen Stet bilong Papua Niu Gini (Hiri Motu), Papua Niugini (shortform, Tok Pisin), Papua Niu Gini (shortform, Hiri Motu)
PRY	Paraguay ^{a}	Republic of Paraguay (official, English), República del Paraguay (official, Spanish), Tetã Paraguái (Guarani)
PER	Peru^{a}	Republic of Peru (official, English), República del Perú (official, Spanish), Perú (common, Spanish), Peruvian Republic (former official name, English), República Peruana (former official name, Spanish)
PHL	Philippines^{a}	Republic of the Philippines (official, English), Republika ng Pilipinas (official, Filipino), Pilipinas (common, many local languages; loan from Spanish, Filipinas), Filipinas (common Spanish and other local languages, ellipsis of following), Las Islas Filipinas (named after Philip II of Spain, historical, Spanish; originally a harmonization of the following), Las Islas Felipenas (historical, by Ruy López de Villalobos), Pinás (colloquial clipping), PH (official initialism, changed from RP to avoid confusion with Poland; see below), Philippine Islands / P.I. (historic; official name under American control; also used colloquially, English), Filipina (common, Malay), Haríng Bayang Katagalugan ("Sovereign Tagalog Nation", historical, by Andrés Bonifacio), Islas de San Lázaro ("Isles of Saint Lazarus", historical, by Ferdinand Magellan), Luzviminda (common, Portmanteau)
POL	Poland^{a}	Republic of Poland (official, English), Rzeczpospolita Polska (official, Polish), Polska (common, Polish), RP (often journalistic, Polish), People's Republic of Poland (former Communist name, English), Polska Rzeczpospolita Ludowa (former Communist name, Polish), Rzeczpospolita (historic common name, Polish), Polish–Lithuanian Commonwealth (historic official name, English), Rzeczpospolita Obojga Narodów (historic official name, Polish), United Commonwealth of the Two Nations (historic official name, English), Polonia (poetic, Latin and Polish), Lechia (historic and poetic original name, Latin, Polish, and English)
PRT	Portugal (common, English and Portuguese)	Portuguese Republic (official, English), Lusitania (official, Latin), Galaico-Portuguese nation and Portucale from the Gallaeci tribe (Celtic Gale and Roman-Celtic Portus Cale) and Galician-Portuguese (ethnic term derived from the original language); Ophiussa also spelled Ophiusa (the ancient Greek name of what is now the Portuguese territory, meaning Land of Serpents); Portugalensis patrie, Portugalensium patrie and Portugaliae by King Afonso I, Regno Portugalensium and Portugalis (Latin, Medieval); Portugalliae et Algarbiae, Portugalliae, Lusitaniae (Latin); Purtugall (Middle Ages); Burtughāl is the word for Portugal and orange in Arabic (Portuguese influence and expansion); Portingall or Portingal (common classical English and other late medieval Germanic languages); Ocidental Praia Lusitana (Western Lusitanian Beach) and Pátria Lusitana (Lusitanian Fatherland) from the national poem Os Lusíadas and from all epic poetry and chronicles of the Late Middle Ages and Renaissance. Luxitania and Portugraal (Port of Grail) in Esotericism and metaphysical literature

== Q ==
Alpha-3 code	Description	Other name(s) or older name(s)
QAT	Qatar ^{a}	State of Qatar (official, English), دولة قطر (official, Arabic), Dawlat Qaṭar (romanized, Arabic)

== R ==
Alpha-3 code	Description	Other name(s) or older name(s)
ROU	Romania ^{a}	Romania (official, English), România (official, Romanian), Rumania or Roumania (archaic, English), Kingdom of Romania (name under monarchy, English), Regatul României (name under monarchy, Romanian), Romanian People's Republic (former Communist name, English), Republica Populară Romînă (former Communist name, Romanian), Socialist Republic of Romania (former Communist name, English), Republica Socialistă România (former Communist name, Romanian), Dacia, Dacia Traiana, Dacia Felix (former names of the historical province of Dacia before and after Roman conquest)
RUS	Russia ^{a}	Russian Federation (official, English), Российская Федерация (official Russian), Russia, (official and common name, ambiguous, English), Russland, (German), Россия (Rossiya) (common, Russian), RF (initialism), Russian Empire (name under monarchy), Russian Socialist Federative Soviet Republic (former name, 1918–1936), Russian Soviet Federative Socialist Republic (former name, 1936–1991), RSFSR (former name initialism), Soviet Union (former name), Union of Soviet Socialist Republics (official former name), USSR (former initialism), Союз Советских Социалистических Республик (former official name, Russian), Soyuz Sovetskikh Sotsialisticheskikh Respublik (former official name, transliterated), СССР (former initialism, Russian), SSSR (former initialism), SU (common, but former initialism), Сове́тский Сою́з (common former name, Russian), Sovetskiy Soyuz (common former name, transliterated), Rus (poetic or obsolete name, ambiguous), Great Russia (obsolete name)
RWA	Rwanda ^{a}	Republic of Rwanda (official, English),République du Rwanda (official, French), Repubulika y'u Rwanda (official, Kinyarwanda), "Pays des mille collines" (poetic, French), Ruanda (former colonial name)

== S ==
Alpha-3 code	Description	Other name(s) or older name(s)
LCA	Saint Lucia ^{a}	Saint Lucia (official, English), Sainte-Lucie (common, French)
KNA	Saint Kitts and Nevis ^{a}	Federation of Saint Christopher and Nevis (official, English), Federation of Saint Kitts and Nevis (co-official, English), Saint Christopher and Nevis (alternate short-form, English), Saint Christopher-Nevis-Anguilla (former official, English), Saint Kitts-Nevis-Anguilla (former common, English), Saint Kitts or Saint Christopher (shorthand, English), Liamuiga and Oualie (former indigenous names of the islands of Saint Kitts and Nevis, respectively)
VCT	Saint Vincent and the Grenadines ^{a}	Saint Vincent and the Grenadines (official, English), Saint Vincent (shortform, English), Hairouna (former indigenous name, Carib)
STP	São Tomé and Príncipe ^{a}	Democratic Republic of São Tomé and Príncipe (official, English), República Democrática de São Tomé e Príncipe (official, Portuguese), Saint Thomas and Prince (literal translation, English)
WSM	Samoa ^{a}	Independent State of Samoa (official, English), Malo Saʻoloto Tutoʻatasi o Sāmoa (official, Samoan)
SMR	San Marino ^{a}	Republic of San Marino (official, English), Repubblica di San Marino (official, Italian), Ripóbblica d' San Marein (official, Romagnol), Most Serene Republic of San Marino ^{a} , Serenissima Repubblica di San Marino (common, Italian)
SAU	Saudi Arabia ^{a}	Kingdom of Saudi Arabia (official, English), KSA (initialism), Saudia (former in English, common in Arabic) Al-Mamlaka al-Arabiyya as-Saudiyya (official name in Arabic), Nejd, Najd (common, former), Hijaz, Saudi regime (used in Iran's news media), Arav haSa'udit (name in Hebrew)
SEN	Senegal ^{a}	Republic of Senegal (official, English), République du Sénégal (official, French), Réewum Senegal (Wolof), جمهورية السنغال (Arabic), 𞤈𞤫𞤲𞤲𞤣𞤢𞤢𞤲𞤣𞤭 𞤧𞤫𞤲𞤫𞤺𞤢𞥄𞤤 (Adlam script), Senegal (common, Fula)
SRB	Serbia ^{a}	Republic of Serbia (official, English), Servia (archaic, English), Srbija (common, Serbian), Republika Srbija (official, Serbian), Serbia and Montenegro (former common, English), Yugoslavia (former common, English), Kingdom of Serbia (former, English), Raška (alternative name in medieval times), Serboslavia (derogatory, used by the rule of Slobodan Milošević)
SYC	Seychelles ^{a}	Republic of Seychelles (official, English), République des Seychelles (official, French), Repiblik Sesel (official, Seychellois Creole)
SLE	Sierra Leone ^{a}	Republic of Sierra Leone (official, English), Salone (shortform, English)
SGP	Singapore ^{a}	Republic of Singapore (official, English), Singapura (common, Malay), Sinhapura (Sanskrit, i.e., Land of Lions), Xīnjiāpō/新加坡 (common, Chinese), Ciŋkappūr/சிங்கப்பூர் (common, Tamil), Pulau Ujong (historical, ancient), Shōnan-tō/昭南島 (former, Japanese occupation), little red dot (colloquial; originally derogatory)
SVK	Slovakia^{a}	Slovak Republic (official, English), Slovensko (common, Slovak), Slovenská republika (official, Slovak), SR (English and Slovak initialism), Slovak Socialist Republic (former name, 1969 to 1990), Slovenská socialistická republika (former name, Slovak), SSR (English and Slovak initialism), Slovak State (former name, 1939), Slovenský štát (former name, 1939),
SVN	Slovenia^{a}	Republic of Slovenia (official, English), Slovenija (common, Slovenian), Republika Slovenija (official, Slovenian), RS (English and Slovenian initialism)
SLB	Solomon Islands^{a}	Solomon Islands (official, English), British Solomon Islands Protectorate (former, English), The Solomons (colloquial, English)
SOM	Somalia ^{a}	Federal Republic of Somalia (official, English), Jamhuuriyadda Federaalka Soomaaliya (Somali), جمهورية الصومال الاتحادية (Arabic)
ZAF	South Africa^{a}	Republic of South Africa (official, English), Azania, Mzansi (Xhosa, for South), Suid-Afrika (official, Afrikaans), Zuid-Afrika (former official, Dutch), Union of South Africa (Colonial, pre-1961)
SSD	South Sudan ^{a}	Republic of South Sudan (official, English), Jamhuri ya Sudan Kusini (Swahili)
ESP	Spain^{a}	Kingdom of Spain (official, English), España (common, Spanish), Reino de España (official, Spanish), Espanya (common, Catalan), Hispania (Latin), Espainia (common, Euskera/Basque), Spanish State (former name, also used now with political nuances), La piel de toro (Spanish) / La pell de brau (Catalan) ("the bull hide," metaphoric name after the shape of the Iberian Peninsula), Las Batuecas (derogatory name used in the works of Mariano José de Larra), Iberia (Ancient Greek; today used for the peninsula which includes modern Portugal), Sepharad (common, Hebrew)
LKA	Sri Lanka^{a}	Democratic Socialist Republic of Sri Lanka (official, English), Ceylon (former, English), இலங்கை சனநாயக சோசலிசக் குடியரசு(official, Tamil), Heladiva (Land of Sinhalese) (former, Sinhala), ஈழம் (Īḻam) (former, Tamil), Ratnadeepa (Island of Gems) (former, Sinhala), elangai/இலங்கை (common, Tamil), Taprobane (one of the medieval names of Sri Lanka)
SDN	Sudan ^{a}	Republic of the Sudan (official, English), The Sudan (alternate English), Anglo-Egyptian Sudan (colonial name, English), Mahdist State (former English unofficial), Nubia (ancient name, also poetic)
SUR	Suriname^{a}	Republic of Suriname (official, English), Dutch Guiana (former, English), Netherlands Guiana (former official, English), Republiek Suriname (official, Dutch), Surinam (English name until 1978)
SWE	Sweden^{a}	Kingdom of Sweden (official, English), Sverige (common, Swedish, Danish, Norwegian), Konungariket Sverige (official, Swedish), Svea Rike (possibly former/poetical, Swedish), Thule (Latin name, also poetic), Svitjod (Old Norse)
CHE	Switzerland^{a}	Swiss Confederation (official, English), Schweiz (common, German, Danish, Swedish), Schweizerische Eidgenossenschaft (official, German), Suisse (common, French), Confédération suisse (official, French), Svizzera (common, Italian), Confederazione Svizzera (official, Italian), Svizra (common, Romansh), Confederaziun Svizra (official, Romansh), Confoederatio Helvetica, Helvetia (Latin, sometimes used officially), CH (initialism)
SYR	Syria ^{a}	Syrian Arab Republic (official, English), الجمهورية العربية السورية (Arabic), al-Jumhūrīyah al-ʻArabīyah as-Sūrīyah (romanized Arabic), Ba'athist Syria (former common name from 1963 to 2024 ruled by the Arab Socialist Ba'ath Party – Syria Region), Assadist Syria (alternative historical name, ruled by the Assad family from 1970 to 2024), Assad regime (common historical name)

== T ==
Alpha-3 code	Description	Other name(s) or older name(s)
TWN	Republic of China (Taiwan) (alternative official name since 2005)	Taiwan ^{a} 臺灣/台灣 (Táiwān) (common), Republic of China/中華民國 (Chunghwa Minkuo) (official), ROC (initialism), Chinese Taipei/中華台北 (Zhōnghuá Táiběi) (international designation), Separate Customs Territory of Taiwan, Penghu, Kinmen and Matsu/台灣、澎湖、金門及馬祖個別關稅領域 (international designation), Taipei, China (designation used by China to imply that Taiwan is part of China), Taiwan, province of China (UN designation), Governing authorities on Taiwan (name used by the Taiwan Relations Act from 1 January 1979), China/中國 (obsolete), Nationalist China (obsolete), Free China (obsolete, pro-Nationalist), Chunghwa (another name in postal romanization), Formosa (former, English), 高砂 (takasago) or 高砂国 (takasagokogu) (obsolete, Japanese).
TJK	Tajikistan^{a}	Republic of Tajikistan (official, English), Ҷумҳурии Тоҷикистон (Tajik), Jumhurii Tojikiston (Romanized, Tajik), Тоҷикистон (common, Tajik), تاجیکستان (Persian), Таджикистан (Russian), Tadzhikistan (Romanized, Russian)
TZA	Tanzania^{a}	United Republic of Tanzania (official, English), United Republic of Tanganyika and Zanzibar (former, English), Deutsch-Ostafrika, together with Ruanda and Urundi (= German East Africa, colonial name until 1918). The country is named after Tanganyika, its mainland part, and the Zanzibar islands off its east coast.
TGO	Togo^{a}	Togolese Republic (official, English), République togolaise (official, French)
TON	Tonga^{a}	Kingdom of Tonga (official, English), Puleʻanga Fakatuʻi ʻo Tonga (official, Tongan)
THA	Thailand^{a}	Kingdom of Thailand (official, English), Siam (former, English), ประเทศสยาม (former, Thai), ราชอาณาจักรไทย (official, Thai), ประเทศไทย (Prathet Thai) (common, Thai)
TLS	Timor-Leste (official, English, Portuguese)	Democratic Republic of Timor-Leste (official, English), República Democrática de Timor-Leste (official, Portugal), East Timor (English), Portuguese Timor (former, English)
	Transnistria ^{a}	Pridnestrovie (official shortform name), Pridnestrovian Moldavian Republic / Pridnestrovian Moldovan Republic (official, longform)
TTO	Trinidad and Tobago ^{a}	Republic of Trinidad and Tobago (official, English), Trinbago (informal, English), Iere (poetic, "Land of the Hummingbird," believed to be derived from Arawak),
TUN	Tunisia ^{a}	Republic of Tunisia (official, English), تونس (common, Arabic), الجمهورية التونسية (official, Arabic)
TUR	Turkey ^{a}	Republic of Türkiye (official, English), Türkiye Cumhuriyeti (official, Turkish), Asia Minor (geographical, English), Anatolia (geographical, English), Ottoman Empire (former, English), Turkish Empire (former unofficial, English)
TKM	Turkmenistan ^{a}	Turkmenistan (official, English), Türkmenistan (official, Turkmen), Turkmenia (unofficial, English), Түркменистан (common, Russian), Туркмения (former, Russian)
TUV	Tuvalu ^{a}	Tuvalu (official, English), Ellice Islands (colonial name, English)

== U ==
Alpha-3 code	Description	Other name(s) or older name(s)
UGA	Uganda ^{a}	Republic of Uganda (official, English), Jamhuri ya Uganda (Swahili)
UKR	Ukraine^{a}	Ukraine (official, English), Україна (Ukrainian), UA, UKR. (initialism)
ARE	United Arab Emirates^{a}	United Arab Emirates (official, English), Trucial States (English, prior to 1971), Al Emirat al Arabbiya al Muttahida (official, Arabic) UAE, U.A.E. (English initialism), Trucial Arabia, Majan, (the) Emirates (colloquial, English)
GBR	United Kingdom^{a}	United Kingdom of Great Britain and Northern Ireland (official, English), Britain (alternative), Great Britain (alternative), United Kingdom (short form), (the) U.K. or UK (initialism), Albion (poetic, Latin), Britannia (poetic, Latin): For England: Anglia (poetic, Latin); For Scotland: Alba (Scottish Gaelic), Scotia (poetic, Latin), Caledonia (poetic, Latin); For Wales: Cymru (official, Welsh), Cambria (poetic, Latin); For Northern Ireland: Ulster (colloquial)
USA	United States^{a}	The United States of America (official, English), America (alternative), United States (short form), (the) US, U.S., USA, Usa, U.S.A., US of A (initialism), Columbia (Latin, poetic), Usonia (English, poetic), These United States of America (Civil War era)
URY	Uruguay ^{a}	Oriental Republic of Uruguay (official, English), República Oriental del Uruguay (official, Spanish), República Oriental do Uruguai (official, Portuguese)
UZB	Uzbekistan ^{a}	Republic of Uzbekistan (official, English), Oʻzbekiston (common, Uzbek), Oʻzbekiston Respublikasi (official, Uzbek), Ўзбекистон (common, Uzbek) Ўзбекистон Республикаси (common, Uzbek) Узбекистан (common, Russian), Республика Узбекистан (common, Russian), Узбекия (former, Russian)

== V ==
Alpha-3 code	Description	Other name(s) or older name(s)
VUT	Vanuatu ^{a}	Republic of Vanuatu (official, English), New Hebrides (former name under British and French condominium rule from 1906 to 1980), Niuhebridis (Bislama), Nouvelles Hebrides (former official name in French), République de Vanuatu (French), Ripablik blong Vanuatu (Bislama), Vanuatri (jocular name used in humour)
VAT	Vatican City ^{a}	Vatican City State (official, English), Status Civitatis Vaticanae (official, Latin), Stato della Città del Vaticano (official, Italian), Holy See (alternative)
VEN	Venezuela	Bolivarian Republic of Venezuela (official, English), República Bolivariana de Venezuela, (official, Spanish), Estado de Venezuela (1830–1856), República de Venezuela (1856–1864), Estados Unidos de Venezuela (1864–1953), and again República de Venezuela (1953–1999)
VNM	Vietnam ^{a}	Socialist Republic of Vietnam (official, English), An Nam (former name in other foreign languages and central Vietnam under French protectorate), Champa (historical kingdom), Đại Việt (historical kingdom), Giao Chỉ (former Chinese province or vassal kingdom), French Indochina (former name under French protectorate when united with Laos and Cambodia, English), Lĩnh Nam (poetic name), parted in North Vietnam (Democratic Republic of Vietnam) and South Vietnam (Republic of Vietnam) from 1954 to 1975, Cộng hòa Xã hội Chủ nghĩa Việt Nam (official, Vietnamese), Việt Nam (short form, Vietnamese), SRV, S.R.V., VN, V.N. (English initialism), Tonkin (former name of northern Vietnam under French protectorate), Cochinchina (former name of southern Vietnam under French colonization), 'Nam (colloquial name given by US military during the Vietnam War)

== W ==
Alpha-3 code	Description	Other name(s) or older name(s)
ESH	Western Sahara ^{a}	Sahrawi Arab Democratic Republic (official, English), Saharawi Arab Democratic Republic (official, English), الجمهورية العربية الصحراوية الديمقراطية (official, Arabic), al-Jumhūrīyah al-'Arabīyah aṣ-Ṣaḥrāwīyah ad-Dīmuqrāṭīyah (official, romanized), República Árabe Saharaui Democrática (official, Spanish), Sahrawi Republic (short form, English), Saharawi Republic (short form, English), República Saharaui (short form, Spanish), Spanish Sahara (former, English), Southern Provinces (Moroccan irredentism, English), Saguia el-Hamra and Río de Oro (English), Saguía el Hamra y Río de Oro (Spanish)

== Y ==
Alpha-3 code	Description	Other name(s) or older name(s)
YEM	Yemen ^{a}	Republic of Yemen (official, English), ٱلْجُمْهُورِيَّةُ ٱلْيَمَنِيَّةُ (official, Arabic), al-Jumhūrīyah al-Yamanīyah (romanized) literally "Yemeni Republic")

== Z ==
Alpha-3 code	Description	Other name(s) or older name(s)
ZMB	Zambia ^{a}	Republic of Zambia (official, English), Northern Rhodesia (former, English)
ZWE	Zimbabwe ^{a}	Republic of Zimbabwe (official, English), Rhodesia or Republic of Rhodesia (former names, English), Southern Rhodesia (former, English)

== See also ==
- List of countries and capitals in native languages
- List of countries
