= Kanze Motomasa =

Japanese Noh actor and composer

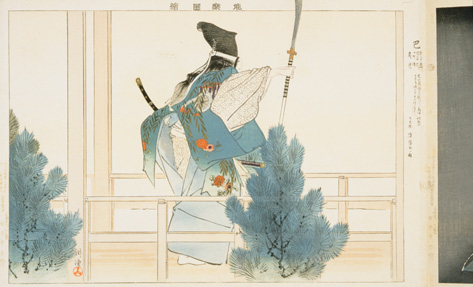
- A performance of Noh drama

Japanese name
- Kanji: 観世元雅
Transcriptions
- Romanization: Kanze Motomasa

Kanze Motomasa (Note: Kanze Motomasa, 観世元雅) (1394? - August 26, 1432), also Kanze Jūrō, was a playwright and actor of Noh theatre. He was the eldest son of famed playwright and actor Zeami Motokiyo. Motomasa succeeded as head of the Kanze troupe when his father retired in 1422.

== Plays ==
Motomasa wrote many plays, including Morihisa, (Note: Morihisa, 盛久) Sumida River, (Note: Sumidagawa, 「隅田川」) Uta-ura, and Yoroboshi. Yoroboshi is a didactic play that encourages the audience to follow the mediation method of Pure Land Buddhism while the sun sets. It also features a love story.

Sumida River is Motomasa's masterpiece. A deranged mother travels from the capital to eastern Japan in search of her kidnapped son, only to find his tomb. A somber tone is established early on and there is very little dancing in this play. When the mother arrives at the grave, she has a brief reunion with the ghost of her son. There are many Noh plays about parents searching for children, but this is the only one in which the parent does not find the child. Motomasa had a discussion with his father about how to portray this ghost. Zeami argued that the ghost should not be shown to the audience as it is supposed to be visible only to the mother. Motomasa disagreed and argued that the ghost should appear to the audience. Zeami responded that he should try it both ways. In modern performances, the ghost is shown.

== Persecution and death ==
In 1428, Kanze Motoshiga (1398-1467), Motomasa's cousin, created a rival troupe. There was a spectacular theatrical face off at the shogun's grounds in Tōnomine in 1429. Fifteen plays were shown. Both Motomasa's troupe and Motoshiga's troupe participated. Some actors appeared on horseback in real armor. Shogun Ashikaga Yoshinori, whose taste was not refined, preferred Motoshiga's style of performance and forbade Zeami and Motomasa from performing at the imperial palace. Motoshiga became the shogun's favorite while Motomasa fled to the provinces. The reason for the persecution of Zeami and Motomasa by the shoguns has long been a subject of speculation. Politics and family loyalties may have played a role.

Motomasa died under mysterious circumstances at Anotsu in Ise Province in 1432. Zeami lamented his son's death in Museki Isshi (1433, A Page on the Ruin of a Dream).

The Kanze troupe does not recognize that Motomasa succeeded his father. Instead, they gave Motoshiga as Zeami's successor. Motoshiga was the ancestor of a long line of heredity troupe leaders. Zeami's writing, published in 1909, confirm Motomasa's place as Zeami's successor.
