= Takasago =

Takasago may refer to:

== Related to Japan ==
- Takasago (play), a Noh play by Zeami Motokiyo
- Takasago, Hyōgo, a city located in Hyōgo Prefecture, Japan
- Japanese cruiser Takasago, a protected cruiser of the Imperial Japanese Navy in service 1897–1904
- Takasago International Corporation, an international producer of flavors and fragrances headquartered in Japan
- Takasago stable, a professional sumo stable (or heya)
- Takasago Uragorō, a Meiji era sumo wrestler and founder of Takasago stable
- Takasago Oyakata, the head coach of Takasago stable

== Related to Taiwan ==
- Takasago, the name Japan called Taiwan around the Edo period
- Takasago Volunteers, soldiers in the Imperial Japanese Army recruited from Taiwanese aboriginal tribes
- Taiwan Beer, Taiwanese beer formerly known as Takasago Beer
