= Yamanba (Noh play) =

Japanese play

山姥
- English title: The Mountain Crone
- Written by: Zeami Motokiyo
- Category: 5th — final
- Characters: shite Yamanba tsure a dancer called Hyakuma Yamanba waki her attendant wakizure attendants aikyōgen local man
- Place: Mount Agero, Echigo province
- Sources: Japanese folklore

Scene from the Noh play 'Yamanba'

Yamanba (山姥) is a frequently-performed Noh play of the fifth category attributed to Zeami Motokiyo. Its central character is the legendary mountain hag, Yama-uba.

== Plot ==
A female dancer, called "Hyakuma Yamanba" because of her frequent performances of songs about the character, embarks on a pilgrimage to Zenkōji in Shinano Province, accompanied by her attendants.

While travelling north-east on the Koshi road, they arrive at the river boundary between Etchu Province and Echigo Province. The road beyond diverges in three directions, and they ask for directions from a local, who advises them that Agero Pass is far too steep for a litter, as it is "the path Amida himself takes as he descends to receive souls." The dancer decides that, as she is a pilgrim, it is fitting that she descend from her litter and proceed on foot, taking that very path.

They have not gone far when the sun sets unexpectedly, and they are offered lodgings by a mysterious old woman, who, after they accept, demands that the dancer perform the Yamanba song. The attendants are indignant, but become afraid when they realise she is a supernatural being.

Suddenly the darkness vanishes, and it is once again the middle of day. They meet the same local man, who tells them tall tales of the origin of Yama-uba. On his departure, the dancer dares not refuse Yama-uba's request — but it is the crone herself who performs the long dance which ends the play.
