= Kanze Motoshiga =

Japanese noh actor (1398–1467)

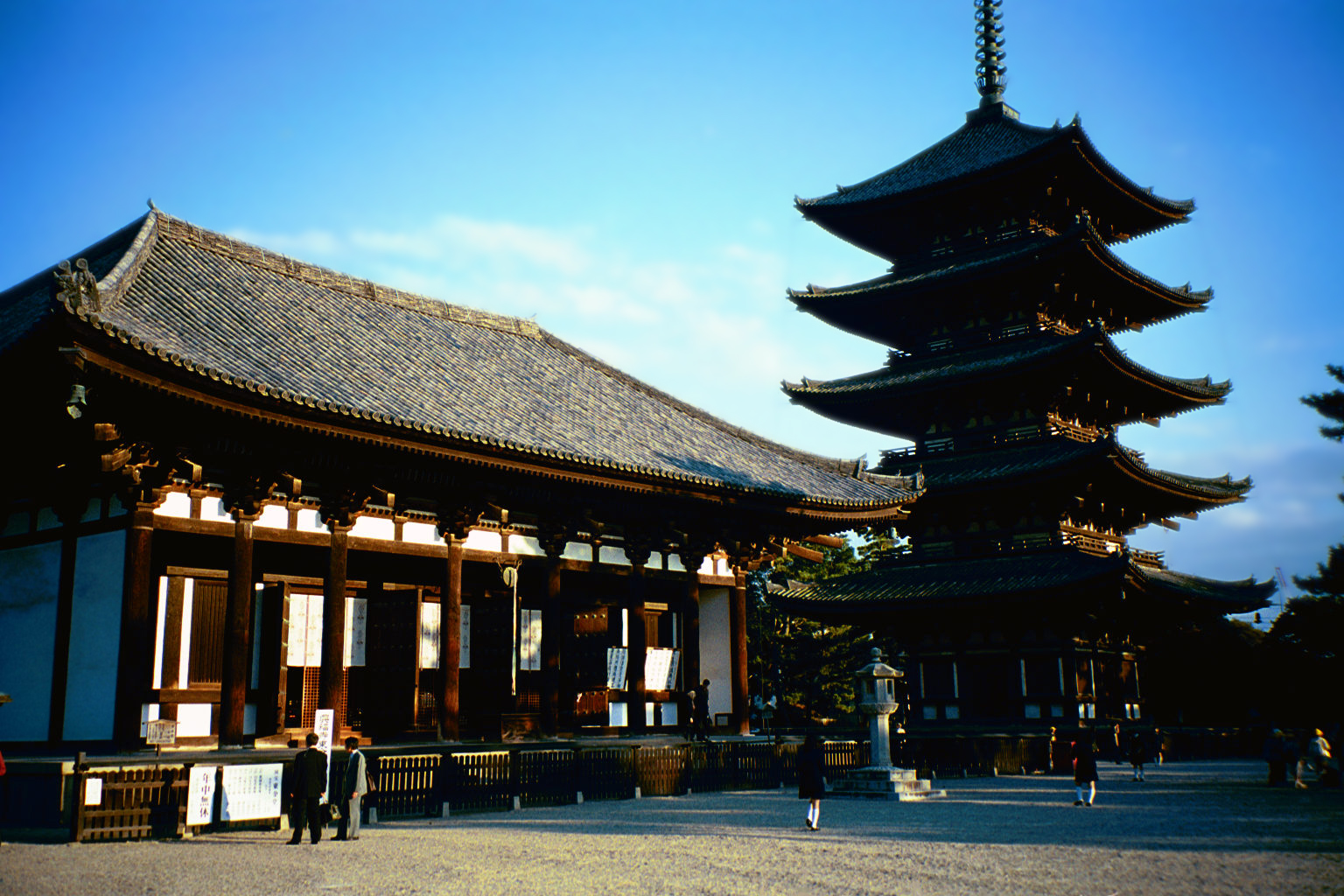
- Motoshige often performed at Kōfuku Temple in Nara.

Japanese name
- Kanji: 観世元重
Transcriptions
- Romanization: Kanze Motoshige

Kanze Motoshige (Note: Kanze Motoshige, 観世元重) (1398-1467), also On'ami (音阿弥), was a Japanese noh actor who led the Kanze troupe from 1433 until his death. His relationship with Shogun Ashikaga Yoshinori (1394-1441) led to the rise of both noh and the Kanze troupe as art forms favored by the shoguns. None of Motoshige's plays or other writing survive.

== Biography ==
Motoshige had a controversial relationship with his uncle Zeami Motokiyo, the best-remembered of the Kanze playwrights. Although Zeami wanted his son Motomasa to succeed him as tayū, (Note: tayū, 太夫) or head of the troupe, Motoshige established a rival troupe that gained the favor of the shogun. The shogun preferred Motoshige's low-brow style of performance. In 1432, Zeami's son and chosen successor Motomasa died suddenly, leaving Motoshige to succeed the troupe in his place the following year.

Motoshige often played at Kōfuku Temple (Note: Kōfuku-ji, 興福寺) in Nara. The various noh troupes were invited to three annual festivals at the temple. The temple was responsible for much of their income. Motoshige organized theatrical festivals that went on for several days and charged admission. They were held at Tadasugawa in Kyoto in 1433 and 1464. The 1433 festival celebrated Motoshige's ascension to tayū. In 1464, Matasaburō, Motoshige's son was the same age his father had been at the previous festival. The shogun attended and the festival lasted for three days and featured 29 plays. Motoshige starred in twelve of these despite the fact that he was nearly 70 at the time and had already retired as tayū.

Motoshige was succeeded as tayū by his son Matasaburō. Motoshige adopted the name On'ami when he took Buddhist vows. The name takes the last syllable of "Kanzeon," the bodhisattva of compassion, and adds the first two syllables of the name adopted by all members of the Jishū (時宗) sect of Buddhism, amidabutsu, or the Japanese pronunciation of Amitābha, the principal Buddha of Pure Land Buddhism. This follows the same pattern as his predecessors Kan'ami and Zeami (Kan-Ze-On). By the time he died, noh was well on its way to becoming an art form identified with the samurai class. The Kanze troupe received the patronage of the warrior class. Kanze became the hereditary troupe of the shogun and the best actors of other troupes were required to join.
