= Takasago (play) =

Classical Japanese dance-drama

高砂
- Written by: Zeami Motokiyo
- Category: 1st — kami mono
- Mood: mugen
- Characters: Shite Ou (old man); tsure Ouna (old woman); waki a priest of Kyushu Aso Shrine
- Place: Takasago, Hyōgo
- Time: early spring evening
- Sources: Kokin Wakashū

Takasago (高砂, Takasago) is a traditional Noh play. It is considered a very auspicious story, involving a loving and long-married couple. The play was formerly known as Aioi (相生, Aioi) or Twin Pines (相生松, Aioi Matsu).

During the play a singer chants, "From Takasago, sailing over the bay, sailing over the bay, the moon goes out with the tide, past the silhouette of Awaji Island, far over the sea to Naruo, arriving at Suminoe, arriving at Suminoe", (Note: In the original Japanese, 『高砂や、この浦舟に帆を上げて、この浦舟に帆を上げて、月もろともに出で潮の、波の淡路の島影や、遠く鳴尾の沖過ぎて、はや住吉に着きにけり、はや住吉に着きにけり』) referencing several places in what are now Hyōgo and Osaka Prefectures. This is considered a classic Noh chant, taken from a classical poem signifying harmony between husband and wife.

== Plot ==
A priest from the Kyushu Aso Shrine arrives at Takasago. The spring weather is pleasant and the pine trees are beautiful. In the distance he hears a bell toll. An elderly couple arrive and begin to sweep the area under the pine bower. The old man recites a poem from the Kokin Wakashū (Collection of Ancient and Modern Poems), a collection of waka poetry. The poem describes Takasago and Sumioe wedded pines (相生の松, aioi no matsu), paired pine trees that, according to legend, will remain together for eternity. He explains that these wedded pines are a symbol of the marital relationship. The priest says that all relationships, indeed all life, falls short of the ideal expressed in the poem.

At this point, the old couple reveal that they are the spirits of the Takasago and Sumioe pines, and they set sail across the bay in a small boat. As the tide goes out, the priest also sets sail, at which point the "From Takasago, sailing over the bay..." chant is recited.

== Takasago Shrine ==
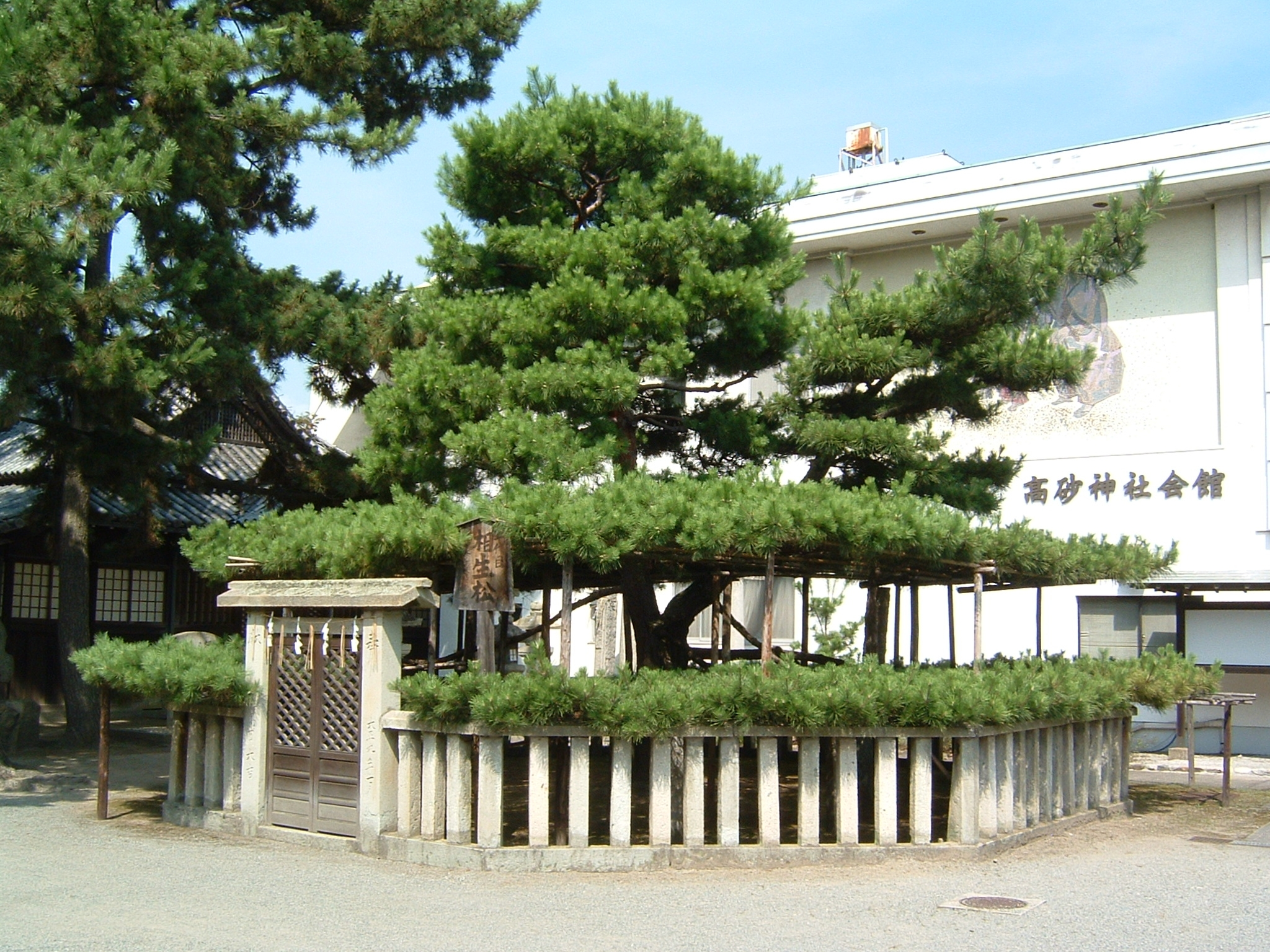
Aioi pines in Takasago Shrine, Hyōgo Prefecture, Japan

According to Takasago Shrine in Takasago, Hyōgo, there have been aioi no matsu twin pines within its grounds since the Shinto shrine was established. A pair of trees called Jō (尉 "old man") and Uba (姥 "old woman") – a Japanese form of Darby and Joan – bearing the legend, "We kami reside in these trees to show the world the way of marital virtue" (Note: 「我神霊をこの木に宿し世に夫婦の道を示さん」) stand within the shrine.

Media related to The Legend of Takasago at Wikimedia Commons
