= Kaya Harukata =

Japanese samurai, Shinto priest and adherent of kokugaku

- 加屋 霽堅

Personal details
- Born: February 2, 1836 Kumamoto Domain, Higo Province, Japan
- Died: October 24, 1876 (aged 40) Kumamoto, Kumamoto Prefecture, Japan
- Cause of death: Gunshot

Kaya Harukata (加屋 霽堅; February 2, 1836 – October 24, 1876) was a Japanese samurai, Shinto priest, and adherent of kokugaku. His courtesy name was initially Tatetsura (楯列), but he deferentially changed it to Tateyuki (楯行) after realizing the original characters were present in the name of Empress Jingū's mausoleum.

== Biography ==
Harukata was born under the name Eita (栄太) in the village of Takadahara, outside the walls of Kumamoto Castle. He was the first son of Kaya Yūsuke (加屋 熊助), a retainer of the Kumamoto Domain. In 1851, when Harukata was 15, Yūsuke became embroiled in a local scandal and was obliged to perform seppuku. As a result, the Kaya family faced a serious threat of collapse. In his capacity as the eldest son, Harukata assumed leadership of the family. Relying on relatives for support, Harukata and his siblings lived in extreme poverty.

In 1858, Kaya entered the nativist school of Hayashi Ōen and became intensely devoted to Shinto. Through Ōen, Harukata became acquainted with the priest Ōtaguro Tomoo. Kaya was known to break down in tears of passion when discussing the welfare of the nation. He was meticulous in his daily worship at Shinto shrines, apparently never missing a single day, and prayed that foreign nations be brought to total submission before Japan.

In 1862, when the Imperial Court requested that the Kumamoto domain contribute forces to guard the Imperial Enclosure, the troops dispatched to the capital included active loyalists such as Kaya and Kawakami Gensai. In 1865, he was imprisoned after returning to Kumamoto for obscure reasons. He was released from prison in 1867, the year of the formal surrender of temporal power to the young Emperor Meiji by shogun Tokugawa Yoshinobu.

In 1868, Kaya was dispatched by the domainal authorities to Nagasaki to assess the situation there. There, he wrote a letter urging the Nagasaki magistrate not to open the port to foreign vessels and to repulse any attempts by foreigners to make landings. His letter was ignored, and he returned to Kumamoto in anguish.

After Ōen's death in 1870, the followers of his school established the Keishintō (敬神党), an anti-foreign militia, of which Kaya was a member. In 1871, Kaya was implicated in the Two Lords Incident and imprisoned, but was soon released.

To placate the increasing discontent of the Keishintō, Kumamoto governor Yasuoka Ryōsuke appointed members as shrine priests. Kaya became a priest at the Nishikiyama Shrine. In 1876, Kaya submitted a long memorial to the central government protesting the Haitorei edict asserting that arming the general populace was integral to Japanese life and national identity, and necessary for the militia as a component of national defense. While other followers of the late Ōen advocated an immediate uprising against government forces in the area, he remained a voice of moderation and an advocate for lawful opposition. However, after an ukehi performed by Ōtaguro, Kaya agreed to participate in the Keishintō's rebellion.

The Keishintō launched the a night attack on Kumamoto Castle on October 24 of that year, and Kaya was killed during the fighting. His age at death was reckoned as 41 years old due to the Japanese custom of counting a person as one year old at the time of birth. His grave is located in the castle's adjoining Omine Cemetery.

== See also ==
- Otagi Michiteru
