= List of wars involving Japan =

This is a list of wars involving Japan recorded in history. This page lists wars between Japanese central or local forces and foreign forces, as well as wars between Japanese central and local forces. Wars that resulted in de facto regime change are also listed. Many battles between local daimyō (feudal lords) and clans that did not result in a de facto change of government are not included in the following list.

== Ancient and Classical Japan ==
Conflict	Belligerents		Results
Jōmon period
Jimmu's Eastern Expedition (c. 7th century BCE, legendary)	Kamu-yamato Iware-biko no Mikoto's clan	Local chiefdoms	Kamu-yamato Iware-biko no Mikoto victory: Kamu-yamato Iware-biko no Mikoto becomes the legendary first Emperor (Emperor Jimmu); Mythical foundation of Japan
Yayoi period
Civil War of Wa (2nd century CE)	Unknown Yayoi chiefdoms	Unknown Yayoi chiefdoms	Establishment of Yamatai state: Consolidation of chiefdoms; Himiko made queen
Yamato period
Goguryeo–Wa conflicts (391–404)	Baekje; Wa; Gaya	Goguryeo; Silla	Goguryeo and Silla victory
Iwai Rebellion (527–528)	Yamato	Kyushu rebels Silla	Yamato victory
Soga–Mononobe conflict (587)	Soga clan	Mononobe clan	Soga victory: Buddhism spreads in Japan
Mishihase War (658–660)	Yamato; Emishi	Mishihase	Victory: Mishihase were possible recent settlers from Siberia; Yamato and Emishi force defeat the Mishihase (Nihon Shoki); Location uncertain, possibly Hokkaido
Baekje-Tang War (660–663)	Baekje; Yamato (at the Battle of Baekgang); Goguryeo	Tang; Silla	Tang-Silla coalition victory: Annexation of Baekje by Unified Silla; Baekje, the traditional ally of Yamato, ceases to exist, Yamato loses influence in Korea
Jinshin War (672)	Prince Ōama's forces	Court of Ōmi Ōtsu Palace	Ōama victory: Prince Ōama (Emperor Tenmu) ascends to the throne and centralizes power
Nara period
Hayato rebellion (720–721)	Imperial Court	Hayato	Imperial victory: Imperial rule established over southern Kyushu
Fujiwara no Hirotsugu rebellion (740)	Forces loyal to Fujiwara no Hirotsugu	Imperial Court	Imperial victory
Fujiwara no Nakamaro rebellion (764)	Forces loyal to Fujiwara no Nakamaro	Imperial forces loyal to Empress Kōken	Imperial victory
Thirty-Eight Years' War (774–812)	Yamato	Emishi	Imperial victory: Sakanoue no Tamuramaro becomes shōgun; Death of Aterui, Yamato control extends further into Tōhoku
Heian period
Tengyō no Ran (935–940)	Imperial Government	Provincial landowners	Rebellion quelled
Toi Invasion (1019)	Jurchen pirates	Daizaifu in Kyushu	Victory
Former Nine Years' War (1051–1062)	Imperial Court	Abe clan	Imperial victory
Later Three Year's War (1083–1089)	Forces of Minamoto no Yoshiie; Governor of Mutsu province	Forces of various branches of Kiyohara clan	Stalemate
Hōgen rebellion (July 28 – August 16, 1156)	Forces loyal to Emperor Go-Shirakawa	Forces loyal to retired Emperor Sutoku	Victory for Emperor Go-Shirakawa: Establishment of Minamoto-Taira rivalry
Heiji rebellion (January 19–February 5, 1160)	Taira clan, forces loyal to Emperor Nijō, forces loyal to Emperor Go-Shirakawa	Minamoto clan	Taira victory: Minamoto leaders banished
Genpei War (1180–1185)	Minamoto clan (Yoritomo): Miura clan; Takeda clan; Hōjō clan; Chiba clan	Taira clan Minamoto clan (Yoshinaka)	Minamoto clan victory: Establishment of the Kamakura shogunate

== Feudal and Early Modern Japan ==
Conflict	Belligerents		Results
Kamakura period
Battle of Ōshū (1189)	Kamakura shogunate	Northern Fujiwara	Shogunate victory: Kamakura shogunate gains control of Tōhoku
Jōkyū War (1221)	Kamakura shogunate and allies	Warrior families loyal to Go-Toba	Shogunate victory
Mongol invasions of Japan (1274, 1281)	Kamakura shogunate; Hōjō clan; Sō clan; Shōni clan; Taira clan; Kikuchi clan; Ōtomo clan; Shimazu clan; Matsura clan; Sashi clan	Yuan dynasty; Goryeo	Japanese victory
Genkō War (1331–1333)	Imperial forces loyal to Emperor Go-Daigo: Ashikaga clan	Kamakura Shogunate: Hōjō clan	Imperial victory: Fall of the Kamakura Shogunate; Imperial rule restored
Nanboku-chō Wars (1336 –1392)	Ashikaga shogunate Northern Court	Imperial forces loyal to Emperor Go-Daigo (1336): Nitta clan; Southern Court (1336–1392)	Ashikaga victory: Imperial rule under Emperor Go-Daigo overthrown (1336); Establishment of the Ashikaga Shogunate and Northern Court; Southern Court disestablished (1392)
Muromachi period
Ōei Invasion (1419)	Tsushima Province: Sō clan	Joseon	Victory: Withdrawal of Korean armies from Tsushima; 24 years after the invasion, the Treaty of Gyehae was signed and the number of wokou pirates gradually decreased
Koshamain's War (1457–1458)	Kakizaki clan	Ainu	Victory: Japanese presence in Hokkaido solidified
Ōnin War (1467–1477)	Hosokawa clan	Yamana clan	Hosokawa clan victory: Hosokawa clan gains control of the shogunate; Ashikaga Yoshihisa assumes the post of shōgun; Most of Kyoto destroyed; Disintegration of the Ashikaga Shogunate, beginning of the Sengoku period
Sengoku period (1477–1603)	Numerous clans: Oda clan Toyotomi clan Tokugawa clan Takeda clan Mōri clan Uesugi clan Later Hōjō clan Shimazu clan Date clan and others		Tokugawa clan victory: After more than a century of near constant civil war and unrest, Oda Nobunaga begins the unification of Japan; Following Nobunaga's death, his successor Toyotomi Hideyoshi completes the unification (1590) and rules until his death in 1598; Tokugawa Ieyasu defeats rival factions and establishes the Tokugawa shogunate (1603)
Sengoku period (1477–1603)	Ikkō-ikki	Various clans: Oda clan	Samurai victory: Ikkō-ikki Buddhist leagues mostly destroyed by the Oda clan in the Ishiyama Hongan-ji campaign
Battle of Fukuda Bay (1565)	Matsura clan	Kingdom of Portugal	Defeat
Azuchi–Momoyama period
1582 Cagayan battles (1582)	Wokou (Japanese, Chinese, and Korean pirates)	Spain: New Spain; (Spain) Spanish Philippines; Indian auxiliaries from Mexico (mostly Tlaxcalans)	Defeat
Bunroku-Keicho War/Imjin War (1592–1598)	Japan: Toyotomi clan	Joseon Korea; Ming China	Defeat: Withdrawal of Japanese armies from the Korean peninsula
Battle of Sekigahara (1600)	Eastern Army: Forces loyal to Tokugawa Ieyasu, clans of Eastern Japan	Western Army: Forces loyal to Ishida Mitsunari, many clans from Western Japan	Eastern Army victory: Tokugawa clan gains nominal control of all Japan
Edo period
Invasion of Ryukyu (1609)	Satsuma Domain	Ryukyu Kingdom	Satsuma victory: The Ryukyu Kingdom becomes a Japanese vassal state
Nossa Senhora da Graça incident (1610)	Tokugawa shogunate: Hizen-Arima clan	Kingdom of Portugal	Victory: The expulsion of João Rodrigues Tçuzu and the loss of confidence in the Jesuits and Portugal by the Tokugawa shogunate
Siege of Osaka (1614–1615)	Tokugawa shogunate	Toyotomi clan	Tokugawa victory: Destruction of the Toyotomi Clan
Shimabara Rebellion (1637–1638)	Tokugawa shogunate Dutch Empire	Roman Catholics and rōnin rebels	Victory: National seclusion policy imposed; Christianity driven underground
Shakushain's Revolt (1669–1672)	Tokugawa shogunate: Matsumae clan	Ainu	Victory: Ainu swear allegiance to Matsumae; Japan consolidates its control of Hokkaido
Bombardment of Kagoshima (1863)	Satsuma Domain	Britain	Defeat: Kagoshima is bombarded by British Ships; Satsuma makes payment of £25,000 to the British
Shimonoseki Campaign (1863–1864)	Chōshū Domain	Britain; Dutch Empire; France; United States	Defeat: Chōshū pays an indemnity of $3,000,000
Mito Rebellion (1864–1865)	Tengutō rebels and local samurai	Tokugawa shogunate	Tokugawa victory
Summer War (1866)	Chōshū Domain	Tokugawa shogunate Aizu Domain	Tokugawa defeat: Choshu Victory; Weakening of the Tokugawa shogunate
Boshin War (1868–1869)	1868: (Imperial Court in Kyoto) Imperial Court; Tozama: Satsuma Domain; Chōshū Domain; Other tozama daimyōs: Tosa Domain; Hiroshima Domain; Tsu Domain; Kubota Domain; Saga Domain; Ōgaki Domain; Yodo Domain; Hirosaki Domain; Kuroishi Domain; Kumamoto Domain; 1869; Empire of Japan	1868: Shogunate; Aizu Domain; Takamatsu Domain; Northern Alliance; Shōnai Domain; Ōtaki Domain; Matsuyama Domain; Jozai Domain; Nagaoka Domain; Sendai Domain; Morioka Domain; Kuwana Domain; Defected: Tsu Domain; Ōgaki Domain; Yodo Domain; 1869; Republic of Ezo	Imperial victory: End of the shogunate; Restoration of imperial rule

== Modern Japan ==
Conflict	Belligerents		Results
Meiji period
Shizoku Rebellions (Saga, Akizuki, Hagi, Shinpūren) (1874, 1876)	Meiji government	Former samurai (shizoku) in Saga, Chōshū, Akizuki and Kumamoto	Imperial victory
Japanese invasion of Taiwan (1874)	Japan	Paiwan; China	Victory: Occupation of Taiwan by Japan
Battle of Ganghwa (1875)	Japan	Korea	Victory: Severe damage inflicted on Korean defenses; Treaty of Ganghwa
Southwestern War (Satsuma Rebellion) (1877)	Meiji government	Shizoku from Satsuma Domain	Imperial victory: Last major shizoku rebellion suppressed, effective end of the samurai as a privileged class; Conscription system established in Japan
Tonghak Peasant Revolution (1894–1895)	Japan Korea; Qing dynasty	Donghak	Victory
First Sino-Japanese War (1894–1895)	Japan	China	Victory: Korea removed from Chinese suzerainty; Treaty of Shimonoseki
Japanese invasion of Taiwan (1895)	Japan	Formosa	Victory: Annexation of Formosa
Boxer Rebellion (1899–1901)	Eight-Nation Alliance British Empire Russia Japan France Germany United States Italy Austria-Hungary: Netherlands; Spain; Belgium; (Qing dynasty) Mutual Defence Pact of Southeast China (after 1900)	Boxer movement; Qing dynasty (after 1900)	Eight-Nation Alliance victory: Rebellion suppressed; Signing of the Boxer Protocol; Provisions for foreign troops to be stationed in Beijing
Russo-Japanese War (1904–1905)	Japan	Russia	Victory: Treaty of Portsmouth; Russia cedes Guandong Leased Territory and South Sakhalin to Japan
Korean Independence Movement (1905–1945)	Japan	Righteous armies (1905–1909) Provisional Government of the Republic of Korea (1919–1945) Various other militant Korean independence groups	End of Japanese colonial rule: Armed resistance and uprisings largely suppressed in the Korean Peninsula; Korean militant groups continued to fight against Japanese forces outside of Korea until 1945; Liberation of Korea in 1945 as a result of the fall of the Empire of Japan, followed by the division of Korea
Battle of Namdaemun (1907)	Japan	Korea	Victory: Disbandment of the Imperial Korean Armed Forces
Beipu uprising (1907)	Japan	Hakka; Saisiyat	Victory: Marked a new phase of armed Taiwanese resistance
Taishō period
Truku War (1914)	Japan	Truku	Victory: Truku people dispersed across Taiwan
Tapani incident (1915)	Japan	Tai Republic; Han Taiwanese; Taiwanese aborigines	Victory: Gradual improvement of colonial administration in southern Taiwan
World War I (1914–1918)	Japan; France (British Empire) United Kingdom: India; Canada; Australia; New Zealand; South Africa; Russia; Italy; United States; Serbia; Montenegro; Belgium; Romania; Portugal; Hejaz (Republic of China (1912–1949)) China; Greece; Brazil	Germany; Austria-Hungary; Ottoman Empire; Bulgaria	Victory: End of the German Empire, Austro-Hungarian Empire, Ottoman Empire, and Russian Empire; Formation of new countries in Europe and the Middle East; Transfer of German colonies and regions of the former Ottoman Empire to other powers; Creation of the League of Nations; Germany cedes Kiautschou Bay Leased Territory and South Seas Mandate to Japan; Kiautschou Bay is returned to China in 1922
Occupation of Constantinople (1918–1923)	Japan; United Kingdom; France; Italy; Greece; United States	Ottoman Empire	Temporary occupation: Temporary military occupation of Constantinople after World War I by the United Kingdom, France, Italy and Greece
Japanese intervention in Siberia (1918–1922)	Japan; White movement United States; United Kingdom; France; Italy; Poland (Republic of China (1912–1949)) China; Czechoslovakia; Mongolia	Russian SFSR; Far Eastern Republic; Mongolian People's Party	Defeat
Shōwa period
Jinan incident (1928)	Japan	(Republic of China (1912–1949)) Kuomintang government	Victory: Occupation of Jinan by Japan
Musha Incident (1930)	Japan; Toda; Truku (Taroko)	Tkdaya	Victory: Uprising harshly suppressed; Change in Japanese colonial strategy; increased effort to assimilate Taiwanese aborigines
Japanese invasion of Manchuria (1931–1932)	Japan	China	Victory: Establishment of the Japanese puppet state Manchukuo
Pacification of Manchukuo (1931–1942)	Japan; Manchukuo	China	Victory: Armed Chinese resistance in Manchuria mostly suppressed
January 28 incident (1932)	Japan	China	Stalemate: China and Japan signs the Shanghai Ceasefire Agreement; Shanghai demilitarized
Soviet–Japanese border conflicts (1932–1939)	Japan: Manchukuo; Korea	Soviet Union; Mongolia	Defeat: Soviet–Japanese Neutrality Pact
Operation Nekka (1933)	Japan: Manchukuo	China	Victory: Tanggu Truce
Second Sino-Japanese War (1937–1945)	Japan Reorganized National Government; Manchukuo; Mengjiang; Provisional Government; Reformed Government; East Hebei	China United States; Soviet Union; Britain	Defeat: Merged into World War II; Chinese victory as part of the Allied victory in the Pacific War; Surrender of all Japanese forces in mainland China (excluding Manchuria), Formosa and French Indochina north of 16° north to China; China becomes a permanent member of the United Nations Security Council; Resumption of the Chinese Civil War
USS Panay incident (1937)	Japan	United States	Victory: Japanese government officially apologises and pays $2,214,007.36 to the United States; Straining of Japan–United States relations
Invasion of French Indochina (1940)	Japan	Vichy France: French Indochina	Victory: Japanese occupation of Northern French Indochina
World War II (1941–1945)	Japan; Germany; Italy; Romania; Hungary; Bulgaria; Slovakia; Croatia; Finland; Thailand; Iraq	United States; Soviet Union; United Kingdom; China; France; Poland; Yugoslavia; Greece; Netherlands; Belgium; Luxembourg; Denmark; Norway; Czechoslovakia; India; Canada; Australia; New Zealand; South Africa; Philippines; Ethiopia; Brazil; Mexico; Mongolia; Tuva	Defeat: Fall of the Empire of Japan, Nazi Germany, and Kingdom of Italy; Allied occupation of Japan and Germany; Continuation of the Chinese Civil War; Substantial weakening of European colonial powers, gradual decolonization of Asia (including the Indonesian National Revolution and the First Indochina War); Creation of the United Nations; Emergence of the United States and the Soviet Union as superpowers; Beginning of the Cold War
Pacific War (1941–1945)	Japan; Thailand	United States: Philippines; United Kingdom; Australia; New Zealand; Netherlands: Dutch East Indies	Defeat Allied victory: End of World War II; Fall of the Empire of Japan; Continuation of the Chinese Civil War; Substantial weakening of European colonial powers and the gradual decolonization of Asia; First Indochina War; Indonesian National Revolution; Korean War; 1951 Treaty of San Francisco; 1956 Soviet–Japanese Joint Declaration; Allied occupation of Japan (1945–1952): Removal of Japanese troops occupying parts of China and the retrocession of Taiwan to China; Liberation of Korea and Manchuria from Japanese rule, followed by the division of Korea; Seizure and annexation of South Sakhalin and the Kuril Islands by the Soviet Union; Cession of Japanese-held islands in the Central Pacific Ocean to the United Nations; Trust Territory of the Pacific Islands created by the United Nations and placed under United States authority
Soviet invasion of Manchuria (1945)	Japan: Manchukuo; Mengjiang	Soviet Union; Mongolia	Defeat Allied victory: End of World War II; Fall of Manchukuo and Mengjiang; Partition of the Korean Peninsula at the 38th parallel; Most of Manchuria and Inner Mongolia are returned to the Nationalist government of China by a 1945 bilateral agreement; Parts of Manchuria and Inner Mongolia are secretly handed over to the Chinese Communist Party guerrillas after the Soviet withdrawal in 1946
Indonesian National Revolution (1945–1949)	Japan (volunteers); Indonesia; India (defectors)	Japan (until 1946) Netherlands: Dutch East Indies; Dutch Caribbean; United Kingdom: India; Australia	Indonesian Victory: Netherlands accepts the Independence of Indonesia
Operation Masterdom (1945–1946)	Japan; United Kingdom; France	Viet Minh	Victory: Restoration of French rule in Indochina; Start of the First Indochina War
Heisei period
Battle of Amami-Ōshima (2001)	Japan	North Korea	Victory: North Korean naval trawler sunk
Iraq War (2003–2011)	Coalition forces: Japan; South Korea; Spain; Denmark; Romania; El Salvador; Estonia; Bulgaria; Moldova; Albania; Ukraine; Czech Republic; Tonga; Azerbaijan; Singapore; Bosnia and Herzegovina; Republic of Macedonia; Latvia; Kazakhstan; Armenia; Mongolia; Georgia; Slovakia; Lithuania; Italy; Norway; Hungary; Netherlands; Portugal; New Zealand; Thailand; Philippines; Honduras; Dominican Republic; Nicaragua; Iceland; United States; United Kingdom; Australia; Poland; Peshmerga New Iraqi government	Iraqi Regional Branch: Supreme Command for Jihad and Liberation; Army of the Men of the Naqshbandi Order; Sunni insurgents: Islamic State of Iraq; Islamic Army of Iraq; Ansar al-Sunnah; Shia insurgents: Mahdi Army; Special Groups; Asa'ib Ahl al-Haq; Others; Iraq	Victory: Invasion and occupation of Iraq; Defeat of Ba'ath Party-led regime and execution of Saddam Hussein; Iraqi insurgency, emergence of al-Qaeda in Iraq, and civil war; Subsequent depletion of Iraqi insurgency, improvements in public security; Establishment of democratic elections and formation of new Shia led government; U.S.–Iraq Status of Forces Agreement; Withdrawal of U.S. troops from Iraq; Rise of Iraqi insurgency after U.S. withdrawal and spillover with the Syrian Civil War; Resurgence of al-Qaeda in Iraq and Syria
Operation Ocean Shield (2009–2016)	Japan; Somalia; NATO; Australia; China; Colombia; India; Indonesia; Malaysia; New Zealand; Oman; Pakistan; Puntland; Russia; Saudi Arabia; Seychelles; Singapore; South Korea; Ukraine	Somali pirates	Victory: Somali piracy greatly reduced

== See also ==
- Japan during World War I
- Japan during World War II
- List of Japanese battles
