= Kagami Jūrō =

Japanese samurai

- 鏡 十郎
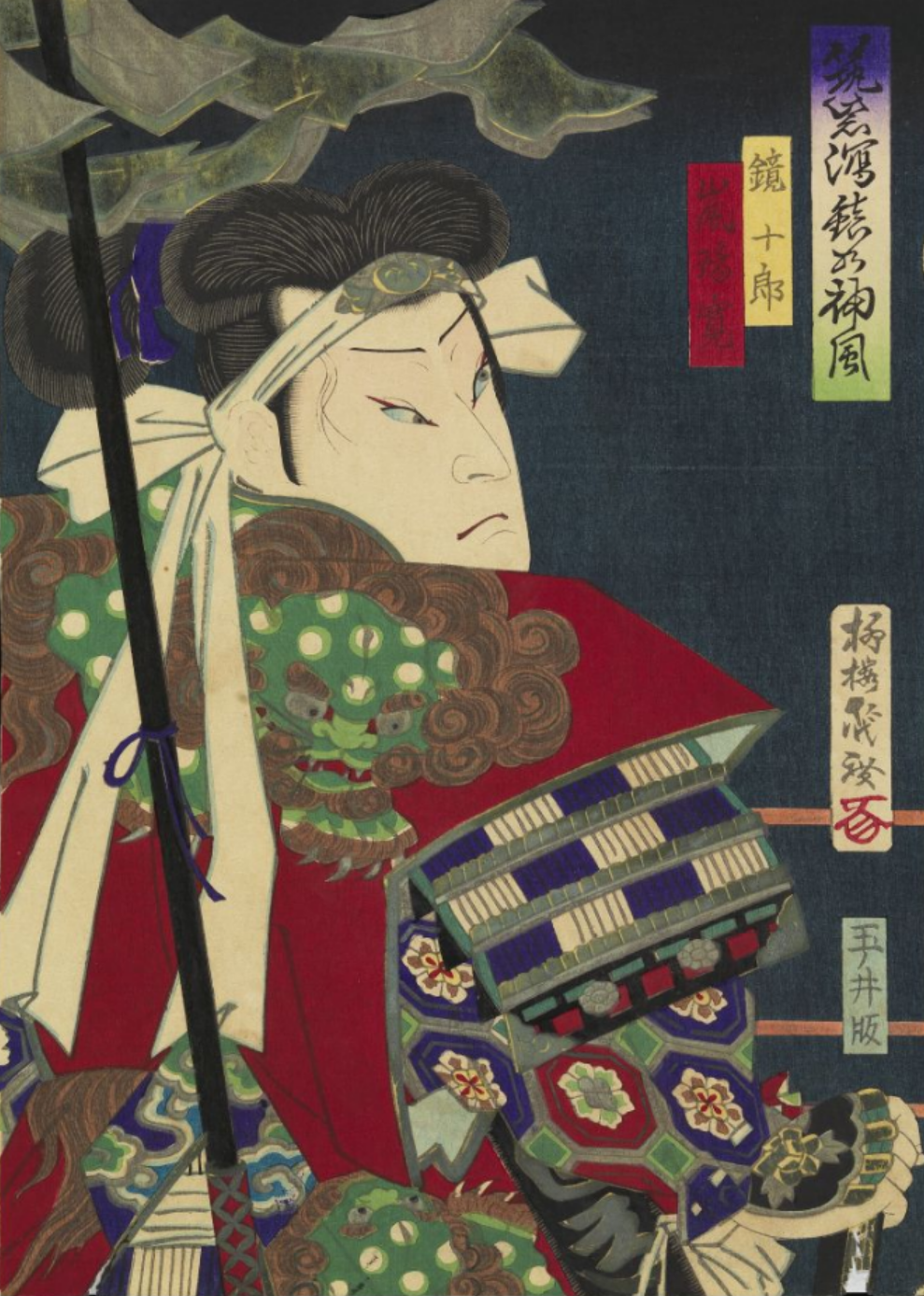
- Kagami Jūrō portrayed by Arashi Rikan IV in a nishiki-e of the early Meiji period.

Personal details
- Born: 1836 Kumamoto Domain, Japan
- Died: 1876 (aged 39–40) Kumamoto Prefecture, Japan
- Cause of death: Suicide

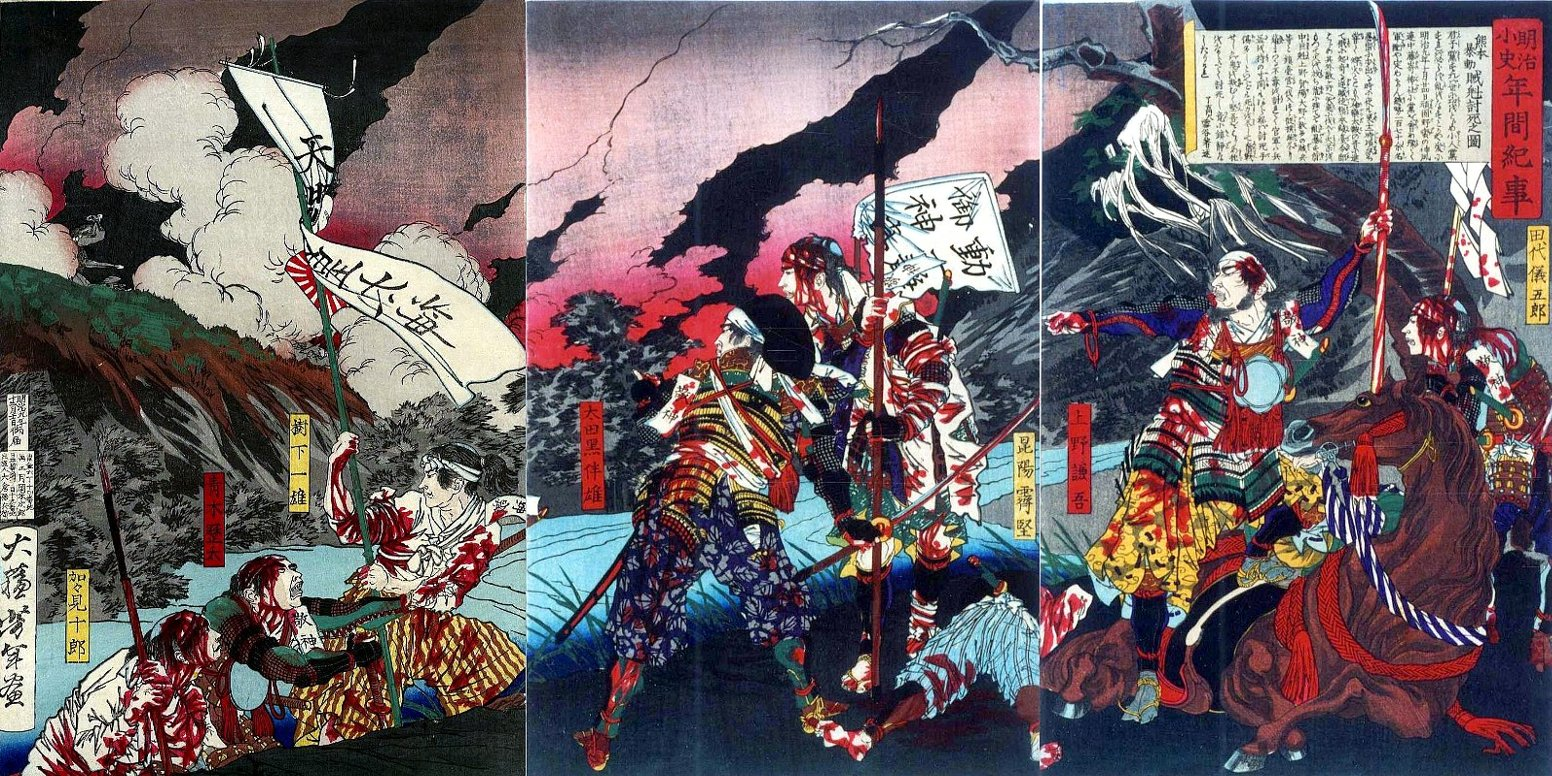
A depiction of the Shinpūren rebellion by Yoshitoshi. Kagami Jūrō, wounded and leaning on a spear, is first on the left.

Kagami Jūrō (鏡 十郎; 1836–1876) was a Japanese samurai retainer of the Hosokawa clan and student of kokugaku. Early surviving sources record the spelling of his surname in man'yō style as (加々見) or (加々美).

== Biography ==
Little record has been preserved of Kagami's early life, but he is known to have been born in the vicinity of the Kumamoto Domain. At some point, he became a subordinate of the domainal vassal Mibuchi Eijirō (三淵 永次郎).

Before 1867, he entered into the tutelage of the kokugaku scholar Hayashi Ōen and became a devout disciple of Ōen's Shinto theology. Subjects of his studies included gagaku as well as kagura, and he is said to have excelled in the performance of ancient music.

Following Ōen's death in 1870, his followers reorganized into a secret society which they named the Keishintō (敬神党). Kagami was an early member of this organization. Angered by the new central government's reversal on its nativist promises in the aftermath of the Boshin War, the Keishintō formulated a plan to seize the local garrison at Kumamoto in preparation for a march on the capital while the majority of the government forces stationed there were occupied by the Saga Rebellion.

On the night of October 24, 1876, Kagami participated in the Keishintō's assault on Kumamoto Castle, and led the attack against the campsite of the regimental artillerymen. The uprising was repelled, and Kagami retreated with a small unit into the nearby mountains. Among the survivors, he was a particularly vocal advocate for a renewed offensive and suggested acquiring funds for escape and rearmament from his former master Mibuchi Eijirō. When this proved impossible due to a widespread police crackdown, Kagami joined several other survivors near the peak of Mt. Odake on the Uto Peninsula, overlooking the castle, in preparation for seppuku. So that the 26-year-old kaishakunin Tashiro Gitarō (田代 儀太郎) would not be left to die alone, Kagami waited until the others had been decapitated and committed suicide alongside Tashiro.

His jisei was recovered from the site of his death, and was collected in a 1944 anthology by Araki Seishi.

Long have I lived beside the spirits of Yamato; now at last I set foot on the floating bridge to the other world
やまと生る神のみかげに存へて今日よりのぼる天のうき橋
