= Runaway Horses =

1969 novel by Yukio Mishima

- First edition (Japanese)
- Author: Yukio Mishima
- Original title: Honba 奔馬
- Translator: Michael Gallagher
- Language: Japanese
- Series: The Sea of Fertility
- Publisher: Shinchosha (orig.) & Alfred A. Knopf (US Eng. trans.)
- Publication date: 1969
- Publication place: Japan
- English publication date: 1973
- Media type: Print (hardback & paperback)
- ISBN: 0-394-46618-7 (Eng. trans. first edition, hardback)
- OCLC: 588941
- Dewey Decimal: 895.6/3/5
- LC Class: PZ3.M6878 Se vol. 2 PL833.I7
- Preceded by: Spring Snow
- Followed by: The Temple of Dawn

Runaway Horses (奔馬, Honba) is a 1969 novel by Yukio Mishima, the second in his Sea of Fertility tetralogy. Mishima did much research to prepare for this novel, visiting locations recorded in the book and studying historical information about the Shinpūren Rebellion collected by previous researchers, including Ishihara Shiko'o. Japanese critics initially reviewed Runaway Horses negatively.

According to Araki Seishi, Mishima didn't care whether or not Runaway Horses sold well, and deliberately selected a featureless wasōbon-like cover design. Araki was concerned that the forbiddingly blank cover would result in younger generations not bothering to read it. However, Shinchosha ultimately included a more decorative design on the dust jackets of the first published edition.

== Plot ==
Set between June 1932 and December 1933, Runaway Horses tells the story of young Isao Iinuma, a rightist reactionary trained in the samurai code by his father. Isao becomes the instigator of a plot to topple the zaibatsu that he feels have corrupted the Yamato-damashii and betrayed the will of the Emperor. He is assured of the army's assistance by the young Lieutenant Hori. They plan to assassinate many key government figures simultaneously on December 3, 1932.

Shigekuni Honda, a character who figured prominently in Spring Snow, the first novel of the cycle, appears again here as a judge and later lawyer. He comes to believe that Isao is the reincarnation of Kiyoaki Matsugae, the aristocratic schoolfriend whose story was told in Spring Snow. Realising that Isao too seems to be hurtling towards a "picturesque" death, he makes strenuous efforts to save him without revealing this personal connection.

=== Honda and Isao (ch. 1-8) ===
It is just after the May 15 Incident of 1932. Shigekuni Honda, the law student from Spring Snow, is now a junior associate judge at the Osaka Court of Appeals. He is asked by Judge Sugawa to give an address at a kendo tournament on June 16 at the Ōmiwa Shrine in Sakurai, Nara Prefecture.

At the tournament, the chief priest points out to him a promising athlete called Isao Iinuma. Honda realises that this is the son of Shigeyuki Iinuma, Kiyoaki's old tutor, now a right-wing "personality". After lunch, Honda climbs the sugi-clad Mount Miwa and afterwards descends to Sanko Falls to bathe. Some of the kendoists are already there. Honda is startled to see that Isao has the same three moles on his side that Kiyoaki had, and remembers Kiyoaki's dying words: "I'll see you again. I know it. Beneath the falls."

The next day, at the Saigusa Festival at Izagawa Shrine in Nara, Honda is introduced to Mr. Iinuma. He now runs the "Academy of Patriotism" (靖献塾, Seiken'juku, pretentiously named after the Seiken Igen of Asami Keisai) and is slowly going to seed, morbidly talkative, his face "marked by the years and by the common tribulations." Honda invites him and his son to dinner that evening. Iinuma accepts, and responds by introducing Honda to the poet, retired Lt.-Gen. Kito, and his 30-year-old divorced daughter Makiko.

Iinuma and his son leave for Tokyo after the dinner. Just before they go, Isao lends Honda a copy of his favourite book, The League of the Divine Wind by Tsunanori Yamao, and urges him to read it.

=== The League of the Divine Wind ===
==== Part 1: The Rite of Ukei ====
"At the time of the... Imperial Restoration, the indications had been altogether favourable that the august wish of His Late Majesty Komei to expel the barbarians would be fulfilled. But clouds soon cut off the light of Heaven... swords were forbidden to the common people... it was decreed that samurai could cut off their topknot and that they might go without swords."

In 1873, four samurai worship at Shingai Shrine in Kumamoto Prefecture, and then await the results of a divination performed by the priest Ōtaguro Tomoo, the heir of the late, revered Hayashi Ōen, whose 200 followers will come to be known as "the League of the Divine Wind". The proposals they have put to the gods are: "To bring an end to misgovernment by admonishing authority even to the forfeiture of life" and "to cut down the unworthy ministers by striking in darkness with the sword". Both return the response "Not propitious." In 1874, the proposal Otaguro puts is to take advantage of the vulnerability induced by the Saga Rebellion. Again, the Ukei rite returns "Not propitious."

On 18 March 1876, the wearing of swords is prohibited. Harukata Kaya resigns as priest of Kinzan Shrine and presents a petition to the prefectural governor. In May, the rite of Ukei is performed by Otaguro, this time returning "Propitious." The others wish Kaya to join them in rebellion, but he is reluctant. A further rite convinces Kaya that it is his duty.

==== Part 2: The Combat of the Ukei ====
On arriving at Kumamoto Castle on the night of 24 October 1876, the 200 warriors split into three units. The first attacks the residences of the major officials; Governor Yasuoka is killed. The second attacks the artillery battalion, with great success; the third attacks the infantry encampment, breaking down barrack doors and throwing in grenades. The tide turns when ammunition is found for the garrisoned troops, and when the second unit rushes to the aid of the third, it is entrapped, and both Kaya and Otaguro die.

==== Part 3: One with the Gods ====
The next morning, on the 9th day of the 9th month (lunar calendar), 46 survivors gather on Mount Kinpo, less than four miles (6 km) west of Kumamoto Castle. The six boats intended for escape are stuck in tidal mud and it is debated what they should do. The seven youngest rebels are sent away with Tsuruda, and the rest descend to Chikozu beach. A scouting party returns with the report that a crackdown is underway and no further military action can be taken. Accordingly, the survivors split up. One by one they surrender or commit seppuku, and a detailed accounting is given of each man's end. The pamphlet concludes with a quotation from the Romance of the Divine Fire (神焰稗史端書, Shin'en haishi tansho), a book later written by the captured rebel Ogata Kotarō (緒方 小太郎) while serving a life sentence in prison.

==== Honda's letter to Isao (ch. 10) ====
Honda sends the book back with a letter that Isao reads when he arrives at school. In it, Honda expresses a new respect for the League, and for the forces of the irrational in general (influenced by his new belief in reincarnation, although that is a secret) and discusses the dead Kiyoaki and his passion for Satoko. However, he warns Isao that the tale of the League is "unsuitable" for him, and dangerous, and lectures him at length on the need for "the comprehensive picture offered by history."

Isao concludes that Honda's "age and profession have turned him into a coward", but that the judge is still in some sense "a man of 'purity'."

=== Isao's circle (ch. 11-14) ===
After school, Isao and two schoolfriends (Izutsu and Sagara) go to the boarding-house of a right-wing army officer, Lieutenant Hori. (It is Kitazaki's—the same inn that appeared in Spring Snow.) Isao boldly announces his intention of organising a "Showa League" and voices extreme sentiments for which Hori expresses sympathy, although the lieutenant becomes tense when Isao asks direct questions about Hori's connections to men involved in the May 15 Incident. The three boys stay until 9pm, listening to him discuss current affairs. Isao lends him The League of the Divine Wind.

On Sunday morning in July, Isao conducts a kendo practice for young boys in the drill hall of the neighbourhood police station. While a detective called Tsuboi talks to him, four Communists are brought to the prison, and Isao feels a stab of envy. Iinuma runs an "Academy of Patriotism" in a wing of his large house in Hongō. We learn about what happened to Iinuma and Miné between 1914 and 1932, and meet the 40-year-old student named Sawa. After Master Kaido's Sunday lecture, Isao shows his two schoolfriends a map of Tokyo, suggesting an air-raid on the areas he has coloured in purple. Later on they have dinner with Makiko at her house, and the four discuss who in Japan most deserves assassination. Isao names Kurahara. Makiko has kept the lilies Isao brought from Izagawa Shrine a month ago, and hands them one each.

Isao visits Hori at the garrison. Hori expresses irritation with Isao's hot-headed talk. During kendo practice, he is impressed with Isao's abilities, and proposes taking him to an audience with Prince Harunori Toin, the military royal for whom Satoko had been intended.

=== The Capitalists (ch. 15-19) ===
Baron Shinkawa gives a banquet at his villa in Karuizawa. Five couples sit and chat in his garden before dinner: the Matsugaes, the Shinkawas, the Kuraharas, the Matsudairas, and the Minister of State and his wife. They discuss current affairs in great detail, with prominence given to the personality and monetaristic opinions of Kurahara. We discover the fate of members of the Matsugae household. The Marquis Matsugae himself is humiliated by his insignificance, even by the fact he has no bodyguard.

Isao has an audience with Prince Toin, against Iinuma's wishes. Hori and the Prince chat for a while; when the Prince criticises the nobility, Isao uses the opportunity to give him The League and to express his ideas about bushido.

By this time, Isao has gathered 20 more boys into his circle, and Izutsu and Sagara have studied explosives. Two weeks before the end of summer vacation, he sends all the boys a telegram ordering them to return to Tokyo for a meeting at the school shrine at 6pm. All turn up and are stunned when Isao tells them it was only a drill; three leave. Isao then has the remaining boys swear vows of fealty. To Isao's surprise, Makiko turns up, and takes them all to dinner at a restaurant in Shibuya.

Chapter 19 gives a description of the opening of a Noh play attended by Honda in Osaka, called Matsukaze. While watching the two ghostly women ladle seawater into their brine-cart, Honda suddenly decides that his grief for Kiyoaki has deceived him and that there could be no real connection between Kiyoaki and Isao.

=== Isao's plot (ch. 20-30) ===
While hanging out his washing in October (on a certain Mr Koyama's 77th birthday), Sawa asks Isao if he can go with him and his "study group" to Master Kaido's training camp in the week starting on the 20 October. Isao makes no reply. Sawa, while serving him tea in his own room, starts to describe how three years ago Iinuma helped extort 50,000 yen from a newspaper and used his 10,000 yen share to bolster the Academy. Isao is disappointed, but not shocked until Sawa warns him, without explanation, that he cannot hurt Kurahara without betraying his father. Wondering if Kurahara is a secret patron of the Academy, Isao later returns to Sawa's room and demands an explanation. Sawa responds by begging to be allowed to kill Kurahara himself. But after hearing him out, Isao smilingly denies there is any plot.

Honda hears an account of the coup d'état that took place in Siam on 24 June, during which the country became a constitutional monarchy controlled by Col. Phahon Phonphayuhasena. On Friday 21 October, Honda attends a judicial conference in Tokyo, and on Sunday goes with Iinuma to see Isao at the riverside training camp at Yanagawa. Isao is in trouble: he has taken offence at the bland Shintoism espoused by Master Kaido and gone out to kill an animal after having been ritually purified. When he accompanies the whole group as they look for Isao, Honda is startled to realise that one of the dreams in Kiyoaki's journal is now being acted out in detail.

Isao holds a secret meeting on Monday evening and shows the other boys his elaborate plan for a "Shōwa Restoration" placing all government functions under the Emperor's control, through (1) destroying Tokyo's six electric transformer substations, (2) assassinating Shinkawa, Nagasaki and Kurahara, and (3) burning the Bank of Japan, events that would lead to the desired declaration of martial law, after which they would all commit seppuku. The plan mentions Hori and Prince Toin. They discuss details of the plot; Isao names December 3 at random as the date, and they receive an unexpected windfall of 1000 yen from Sawa, who claims he acquired the money by selling land.

Honda visits Kiyoaki's grave before returning to Osaka. On November 7, Lieutenant Hori summons Isao and tells him he is being sent to Manchuria on November 15. When Hori suggests moving the date of the plot to this week, Isao realises that he has no intention of taking part. Hori suddenly urges Isao to give up the plot, and Isao pretends to be persuaded. At the group's secret headquarters (a rented house in Yotsuya Sumon) Isao tries to salvage the plan. Seyama, Tsujimura and Ui argue with Isao in private, and he dismisses them from the group. Within days, only 10 are left with Isao, and on November 12 they are joined by Sawa, who sets out a plan for the 12 of them to assassinate one capitalist each. Sawa is assigned Kurahara, and Isao is assigned Baron Shinkawa.

Isao visits the Kitos one last time on November 29 to deliver a present of oysters, but Makiko follows him, guessing that he has resolved to die, and they kiss on a hill opposite Hakusan Park. Makiko promises to go to Ōmiwa Shrine at Sakurai and bring them each back a talisman the day before they go ahead. Isao does not admit they already each have one of her lily petals.

The morning of December 1, the boy conspirators are at their hideout, discussing the daggers they have bought, when they are arrested by detectives. In the afternoon Sawa is arrested at the Academy.

=== Discovery and trial (ch. 31-37) ===
On reading about Isao in the newspaper, Honda resolves to save him, and resigns his judgeship to act as defence lawyer for Isao. In Tokyo, Iinuma thanks him, and then claims that it was he himself who informed the police, and that he did it to save his son from death. Prince Toin summons Honda to his house on December 30. The prince expresses sympathy for the twelve, but is horrified when Honda informs him that he was mentioned by name in the propaganda leaflets they prepared, and loses interest in helping them. Honda saves the situation by persuading him to lean on the Imperial Household Minister to have that part of the evidence suppressed.

Isao is moved to Ichigaya Prison in late January, and a long prophetic dream is described. He learns that Honda will be defending him, and realises that he has awakened popular sympathy. During an interrogation he hears Communists being tortured, and asks why he is not tortured; the interrogator replies that as a rightist he has his heart in the right place. In June he receives a Saigusa Festival lily from Makiko, which she has gone all the way to Nara to pick. The trial opens on June 25. The evidence of the leaflets has been suppressed, and it becomes clear that Lt. Hori is unlikely to be indicted.

At the second session on July 19, Isao boldly admits to planning the assassinations. Honda tries to fudge the issue by bringing up the purchase of the daggers and leading the witness Izutsu to admit that, as imitators of the League of Divine Wind, these weapons would be more appropriate for committing seppuku than for murder. The innkeeper Kitazaki is called as witness, and he says he heard Hori telling a lone visitor to "Give it up!" although he did not know to whom Hori was speaking. Pressed to identify the person, Kitazaki points to Isao, but his strange words seem to suggest he is confusing Isao with Kiyoaki, although they had no physical resemblance. Most assume he is senile. Only Honda realizes the significance of his confusion of Kiyoaki and Isao.

Makiko is called as witness, and while reading a mendacious diary entry for November 29, she manages to cleverly insinuate that Isao was not only planning to abandon the conspiracy, but that he was merely a schoolboy in over his head, boasting and play-acting all along. The manipulative older woman hopes that her young lover will surrender his ideals and save himself by lying, since he cannot contradict her in court without exposing her to a charge of perjury. Thinking fast, Isao sidesteps dishonor by claiming that he did indeed talk of giving up the conspiracy, but only to spare her from any consequences of his actions. The judge, who becomes sympathetic, allows him to enlarge on his motives, and he delivers a long address on the suffering of the common people and the need to destroy the deadly spirit poisoning Japan. The prosecutor expresses doubts about Makiko's testimony, but it is clear he senses defeat.

=== Denouement (ch. 38-40) ===
The verdict is handed down on December 26. They are found guilty, but punishment is remitted on account of their youth and pure motives, and they are released. That evening, a celebratory dinner is held at the Academy of Patriotism. Tsumura, the youngest student, is irritated by the jolly atmosphere and shows Isao a newspaper account of desecratory blunders made by Kurahara on December 16 at the Inner Ise Shrine. Iinuma, drunk, tells Isao that he was the informant. Isao is not surprised until Iinuma goes on to say that the Academy is run entirely with money paid by Baron Shinkawa as protection, and that Shinkawa made him promise, just before the May 15 Incident, never to allow Kurahara to be touched. Later, Honda hears the sleeping Isao mutter "Far to the south. Very hot...in the rose sunshine of a southern land," predicting his next reincarnation. In the morning he meets Tsuboi, who asks him to teach kendo to children, and he has a vision of himself doing so till old age. Sawa takes Isao into his room and lets him know that it was Makiko (whom Isao has not seen since the trial) who told Iinuma of their plan by telephone. This is the final straw for Isao.

On 29 December, Isao slips away from Sawa during a lantern procession, buys a dagger, and travels to Inamura, a seaside village near Atami, Shizuoka. He breaks into Kurahara's weekend house, stabs him to death because of his blasphemy at Ise Shrine, then runs through his tangerine orchards down to a cave on the shore where he commits seppuku.

== Major themes ==
The book explores the history and atmosphere of the early Showa Period and also of the Meiji Period through Isao's increasing obsession with the League of the Divine Wind, a group that attempted an insurrection in Kumamoto in October 1876, eight years after the Meiji Restoration, in reaction to the prohibition of the wearing of swords.

It also discusses the Wang Yangming school of thought (according to which, "to know and not to act is not truly to know"), espoused in Japan by Chusai Oshio, a rebel who died in 1837 while leading an insurrection in Osaka.

While Mishima's vision is considerably darker, more ambiguous and more complex than that of J.D. Salinger, the theme of adult corruption versus adolescent purity is strongly present throughout the novel. Isao resembles Holden Caulfield in his disdain for adult duplicity, hypocrisy, and the dreary ugliness of adult sexuality, but differs from him sharply in terms of his greater courage, his charisma and natural leadership, his passionate eloquence and athletic skill, his reverence for the past, and above all his willingness to sacrifice himself for the greater good.

Isao's final acts are to a certain extent nihilistic because he performs them after he has become aware of their falsehood and futility. In other words, it is a much more profound kind of suicide than the one he had been planning. Isao’s actions can also be viewed in the light of Martin Heidegger’s existentialist philosophy and its embrace of death.

The book explores the boundary between atheism and religious belief by presenting Honda with seeming evidence of reincarnation and exploring his emotional responses. The religions of Buddhism and Shinto are contrasted.

== Characters ==
Major characters

- Shigekuni Honda
- His wife Rié, married in 1922
- Isao Iinuma (1914–33)
- Shigeyuki Iinuma, Isao's father, Kiyoaki's former tutor
- Lieutenant Hori, a right-wing Army officer
- Lieutenant-General Kensuké Kito (retired), a poet
- Makiko Kito, General Kito's daughter, a cunning, seductive older woman who is in love with Isao
- Prince Harunori Toin, an aristocrat distantly related to the royal family
- Judge Murakami, a friend of Honda
- Judge Sugawa, Chief Justice of the Court of Appeals, and a kendo enthusiast
- Tsuboi, a Special Police detective and 2nd-level kendoist
- Master Kaido Masugi, an elderly disciple of Hirata Atsutane
- An official sent to Honda by Prince Toin
- Judge Hisamatsu, who tries Isao and his companions
- The unnamed prosecutor
- Reikichi Kitazaki, the old innkeeper
- Lieutenant Miura, also at the inn (mentioned by Kitazaki but never seen)
- The Matsugaes, the Matsudairas, the Minister of State and his wife
- Baroness Shinkawa and Mrs. Kurahara

Capitalists

- Baron Tōru Shinkawa
- Busuké Kurahara
- Juemon Nagasaki
- Nobuhisa Masuda, Shonosuké Yagi, Hiroshi Teramoto, Zembei Ota, Ryuichi Kamiya, Minoru Gota, Sadataro Matsubara, Genjiro Takai, and Toshikazu Kobinata are added to the list by Sawa

Showa League

- Isao Iinuma
- Sawa, a 40-year-old student at the Academy
- Izutsu and Sagara, the two schoolfriends of Isao
- Hasegawa and Serikawa, along with Sagara and the nine who back out, were to attack transformer substations
- Miyaké, Miyahara, Kimura and Fujita were to help Isao and Izutsu with the three original assassinations
- Takasé and Inoué, Army officers
- Lieutenant Hori and First Lieutenant Shiga of the Air Force
- Seyama, Tsujimura, Yoneda, Sakakibara, Horié, Mori, Ohashi, Takahashi, Ui

== Reception ==
Richard T. Kelly of The Guardian, after discussing the character of Honda envying Isao's ardor, wrote that "Mishima is dispassionately brilliant in noting ignoble human impulses – the twinge of jealousy, the flicker of disgust."

== References to other works ==
- Minamoto no Sanetomo, a poet of the 13th Century, to whom the fictional Kito's Hekiraku is compared (ch.7)
- Ogata Kotarō's "Romance of the Divine Fire" is an abridged version of the historical Sorrowful Draft from Prison (獄の憂草, Goku no Yūsō), perhaps also influenced by the Prison Utterances (幽囚唫, Yūshūgon) of Koyama Hagyaku (小山破逆) (ch.9)
- Kita Ikki's An Outline Plan for the Reorganization of Japan (日本改造法案大綱 Nihon Kaizō Hōan Taikō), written in 1923, considered unsuitable for his followers by Isao (ch.18)
- Matsukaze, a Noh drama featuring the actors Kanesuke Noguchi and Yazo Tamura (ch.19)
- Atsutane Hirata, a Shintoist famous for diatribes against Buddhism (ch.22-23)
- The last poem by Inokichi Miura, of the Sakai incident, chanted by Sawa (ch.26)
- An anti-Buddhist poem by Kohei Tomobayashi, recited by Sawa (ch.26)
- Isao receives Dr. Inoue Tetsujirō's Philosophy of the Japanese Wang Yangming School in prison (ch.35)
- A gramophone record of Wilhelm Furtwängler conducting the Berlin Philharmonic in Richard Strauss's tone-poem Till Eulenspiegel is listened to by Prince Toin (ch. 32)
- In an essay, Baron Shinkawa mentions The Decline and Fall of the Roman Empire by Edward Gibbon (ch.28)

== References to historical events ==
Runaway Horses is the most explicitly political of the novels in The Sea of Fertility and contains detailed descriptions of the court and penitentiary systems of the time, and of official attitudes towards political extremists.

- The May 15 Incident of 1932, during which Prime Minister Inukai was assassinated, is in the newspaper Honda reads in the opening scene (ch. 2)
- The kendo tournament takes place at Omiwa Shrine at the foot of Mount Miwa near Sakurai, Nara (ch. 4)
- The Shinpūren Rebellion of 1876: an attack on Kumamoto Castle led by "The League of the Divine Wind" (Japanese Shinpūren), and retreat to Mount Kinpo, immediately prior to the Satsuma Rebellion (ch. 9)
- The capture and imprisonment of Ogata Kotarō. Although the novel insinuates that Ogata remained in prison for the rest of his life, he was in fact released under amnesty in 1881. (ch. 9)
- Near Isao's classroom at the Kokugakuin is a taiko made by the master drum-maker Onozaki Yahachi (小野崎彌八). (ch. 10)
- Meiji Shrine and Yasukuni Shrine are visited every month by Iinuma's academy (ch.12)
- A petition presented at the Japanese Diet in June 1932 for a moratorium on farmers' debts (ch. 15)
- The UK goes off the gold standard in 1931 (ch. 15)
- The retiring Finance Minister Takahashi's efforts to sabotage the embargo on gold exports (ch. 15)
- The possibility of the recognition of Manchukuo (ch. 15)
- The policy of reflation (ch. 15)
- The rice riots of 1918, which prompted Premier Terauchi's resignation (ch. 15)
- The Bon Festival in Karuizawa (ch. 15)
- The Olympic Games of 1932 in Los Angeles, United States (ch. 18)
- Honda goes to the Osaka Noh Theatre in Tennoji-Dogashiba (ch. 19)
- Master Kaido's 6-acre (24,000 m^{2}) training camp is at Yanagawa, in Minamitsuru District, Yamanashi. The camp lies under Motozawa Cliff, next to the Katsura River, near Mount Gozen (ch. 22-23)
- Isao remembers sparring with the kendo master Fukuchi (ch. 27)
- The London Naval Conference 1930, considered humiliating to Japan (ch. 37)
- Sagoya shoots Premier Hamaguchi (ch. 37)
- Famine in Tohoku and Hokkaidō in 1931 (ch. 37)

== Notes ==
Until after World War II, Japanese people generally reckoned age by number of different regnal years lived in rather than by birthdays. So in ch. 36, Isao is asked his age at the trial in July 1933 and responds "20", although his 20th birthday cannot occur until after February 1934. The translation usually tries to disguise this problem.

== Film ==
Runaway Horses is one of three Mishima novels adapted by Paul Schrader for his 1985 film Mishima: A Life in Four Chapters. It features in chapter three, "Action". The other two novels are The Temple of the Golden Pavilion and Kyoko's House.

== Quotations ==
In a letter about The League of the Divine Wind, Isao's favorite book (a book which Mishima reproduces in full), Honda writes to him: "At your age, however, every excitement is dangerous. Every excitement that can send one pitching headlong is dangerous. And some are especially dangerous. For example, judging from that light that flashes from your eyes to disconcert those around you, I would think that your very nature makes a tale of this sort 'unsuitable' for you."

In prison, Isao considers the reasons for the failure of his plot and subsequent imprisonment. He determines that the very act or bonding with his comrades in a "blood brotherhood" had brought about, or in the words of the novel "crystallized", an evil that is only possible in the presence of purity, musing: "The purest evil that human efforts could attain, in other words, was probably achieved by those men who made their wills the same and who made their eyes see the world in the same way, men who went against the pattern of life's diversity, men whose spirits shattered the natural wall of the individual body, making nothing of this barrier, set up to guard against mutual corrosion, men whose spirit accomplished what flesh could never accomplish."
