= Haitō Edict =

Meiji-Era proclamation

The Sword Abolishment Edict (廃刀令, Haitōrei) was an edict issued by the Meiji government of Japan on March 28, 1876, which prohibited people, with the exception of former lords (daimyōs), the military, and law enforcement officials, from carrying weapons in public; seen as an embodiment of a sword hunt. Violators would have their swords confiscated.

== History ==
The Haitōrei was one of a series of steps taken by the government to abolish the traditional privileges of the samurai class. The first Haitōrei of 1870 prohibited farmers or merchants from wearing swords and dressing like samurai. This measure was in part an effort to restore public safety and order during the tumultuous period immediately after the Meiji Restoration and during the Boshin War.

In 1871, the government issued the Danpatsurei Edict, allowing samurai to cut their top-knots and wear their hair in the Western manner. However, this was not required, simply allowed and encouraged. Universal military conscription was instituted in 1873, and with the creation of the Imperial Japanese Army, the samurai warrior class lost their monopoly on military service. The hereditary stipends provided to the samurai by their formal feudal lords (and assumed by the central government in 1871) were likewise abolished in 1873. The prohibition on wearing swords was controversial with the Meiji oligarchy but the argument, that it was an anachronism not in keeping with the westernization of Japan, won out.

On March 28, 1876 the Haitō Edict was passed by the Daijō-kan. It prevented former samurai, now known as shizoku, from carrying swords.

== Effects ==
These changes in Japanese society and in the social and economic status of the samurai, then part of the four classes, were a major cause of discontent in early Meiji period Japan, and led to a number of samurai-led insurrections, particularly in western Japan and Kyūshū.

Also as a result of the Haitōrei, swords lost their utilitarian role, and many swordsmiths were forced to turn to the production of farming implements and kitchen cutlery to survive.

== See also ==
- Saga Rebellion
- Akizuki rebellion
- Hagi Rebellion
- Shinpūren rebellion
- Satsuma Rebellion
