= Yasuoka Ryōsuke =

Samurai

- 安岡 良亮
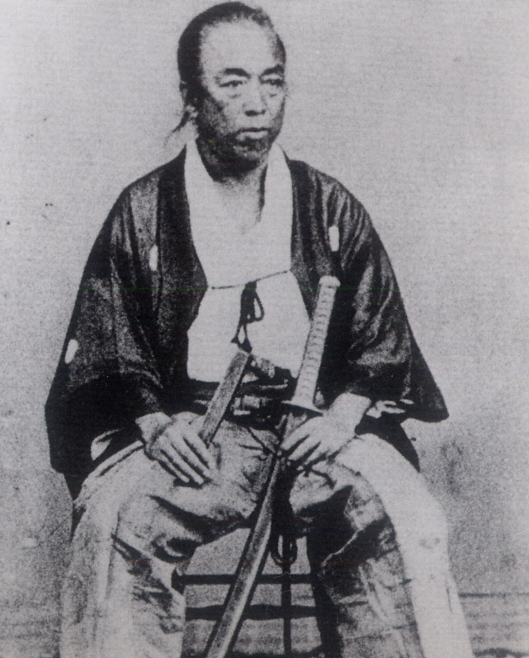

Governor of Kumamoto Prefecture
- In office 22 February 1876 – 24 October 1876
- Monarch: Meiji
- Preceded by: Office established
- Succeeded by: Takaaki Tomioka

Personal details
- Born: 8 April 1825 Nakamura, Tosa, Japan
- Died: 27 December 1876 (aged 51)
- Cause of death: Assassination

Military service
- Allegiance: Tosa Domain; Empire of Japan
- Branch: Imperial Japanese Army
- Years of service: 1868–1876
- Battles/wars: Boshin War; Saga Rebellion; Shinpūren rebellion †

Yasuoka Ryōsuke (安岡 良亮; 8 April 1825 – 27 December 1876) was a feudal lord of the Tosa Domain and a samurai of the Jinshotai in the late Edo period. He was a bureaucrat in the first half of the Meiji era, Shirakawa prefectural ordinance, and Kumamoto prefecture ordinance.

During the Boshin War, he captured and beheaded Kondō Isami. He was the great-grandfather of Masahiro Yasuoka, a Yomei scholar who wrote Yangmingism drafting sentences of the imperial rescript during World War II.

== Biography ==
=== Bakumatsu Period ===
Born in April 1825 as the first son of The Late Goro Yasuoka, he was born in his hometown of Nakamura in the Tosa Domain.

He was a male actor and a talented bunbu, and according to Tosa feudal lord Takezaemon Sotoike, he learned hioki-style archery, Nishikawa Kusunoki Yata learned equestrian and swordsmanship, and learned gun science from Kenkichi Hijikata. He first studied literature at his hometown, Toka Tsurun, and later entered the gates of Kaoru and Kamei Tetsuta. He studied long in Chinese studies, and it heard it by those who often wrote poetry.

During the Bunkyū and Genji eras, he organized the Hata-Touo Party according to Shinkichi Higuchi and worked in state events, and in 1867 he participated in the conclusion of the Satsuma Dobaku Secret Agreement between Saigō Takamori in Satsuma and Itagaki Taisuke retreat at the Komatsu Obito Residence in Kyoto.

In the Boshin War, he went to war as a half-captain of the Jinshotai, he was selected, and proceeded to the deity. It became a small inspection. Moreover, it hit the execution of Kondō Isami with Tosa feudal lord Tani Tateki, and others spectating.

=== Meiji Era ===
He served in the new government, and in 1869 he served as a member of the Assembly until 1871, and since August 1871, he then served as a councillor in the Takasaki Domain, a Gunma prefectural councillor, and gunma prefectural councillor.

In 1873, he was appointed to Kumamoto under the Shirakawa Prefectural Government Ordinance, and in 1875 he was appointed to The Shirakawa Prefectural Ordinance and in 1876 he was appointed to the Kumamoto Prefecture Ordiance.

At this time, he tried to harmonize the human minds of the people of The Keijin Party (Kamikazeren) of Ōtaguro Tomoo, and in the event of the Saga Rebellion, he gave competent leadership, such as quelling the agitation of the Kumamoto samurai.

== Death ==
On 24 October 1876, Kamikazeren was attacked by members of the Shinpūren and four people including the chief of staff and inspectors at home were assassinated. At this time, he hid in the back field and was saved, but died three days later at Zhendai Hospital from his wounds.
