= Michiteru =

- Pronunciation: mʲit͡ɕʲi̞te̞ɺɯ̹ (IPA)
- Gender: Male

Origin
- Origin: Japanese
- Meaning: Different meanings depending on the kanji used

Michiteru is a masculine Japanese given name. It can be written using many different combinations of kanji characters (智輝, "intellect, sparkle"; 通光, "pass, light"; 通旭, "pass, sunrise") It could refer to:

- Koga Michiteru (久我 通光; 1187-1248), Japanese nobleman
- Michiteru Mita (三田 智輝; born 1975), Japanese former footballer and manager
- Otagi Michiteru (愛宕 通旭; 1846-1872), Japanese kuge and bureaucrat
