= Ukehi =

Shinto divination ritual

Ukehi or Ukei (誓; lit. "divination [by] oath") is a divination ritual in Japan. The Early Middle Japanese form was ukefi, which is pronounced ukei in modern Japanese.

Generally, it was a form of cleromancy that involved asking a question of the kami and arriving at an answer through some form of sortition. The belief was that the kami would influence the outcome of the sortition in order to communicate their will.

== Function and performance ==
Hayashi Ōen, a nineteenth-century practitioner of ukehi, identified six functions of the rite. He claimed it could be used to:

- ask for information or messages from the kami
- establish the will of the kami
- predict the outcome of an event
- debilitate or animate living beings
- manipulate weather conditions
- kill one's enemies

The dictates of ukei can come as a dream, but more commonly the petitioner would use the ritual to ask a question of the kami and then await an omen of some sort to confirm their response. If nothing happened, it was assumed that the kami did not favour the proposed course of action. The questioning of the kami took the form of an oath or vow. Sometimes the ritual involved inscribing the choices available on bamboo slips, which were then shaken in a container; whichever slip fell out dictated the appropriate course of action.

In the novel Runaway Horses, Yukio Mishima described the procedure of ukei as "contain[ing] an element of danger not unlike a footing that could give way at any moment".

== Notable ukehi ==
- An ukehi ritual undertaken by the deities Amaterasu and Susanoo-no-Mikoto resulted in the birth of eight more deities.
- Ukehi by hunting (うけひ狩り, ukehigari) is described in the Nihon Shoki.
- Also in the Shoki, the Emperor Jinmu carries out an ukehi involving submerging jars of ame rice-syrup into the headwaters of a river, and when the river fish become inebriated and float to the surface, this is taken as a sign of the approval of the kami.
- In the late 19th century, Hayashi Oen and his pupil Otaguro Tomoo performed ukehi several times, and eventually the latter received what he believed was divine authorization to begin the Shinpūren rebellion.

== See also ==
- Kotodama
- Flipism, the practice of relying on random outcomes to make decisions
