= Ishihara Shiko'o =

Japanese historian, educator, and author (1874–1936)

- 石原 醜男
- Born: 1874; Tamana District, Kumamoto Prefecture, Empire of Japan
- Died: 1936 (aged 61–62); Kumamoto Prefecture, Empire of Japan
- Occupation: Historian
- Notable work: Shinpūren Ketsuruishi
- Parent(s): Ishihara Unshirō (石原 運四郎); Ishihara Yasu (石原やす)

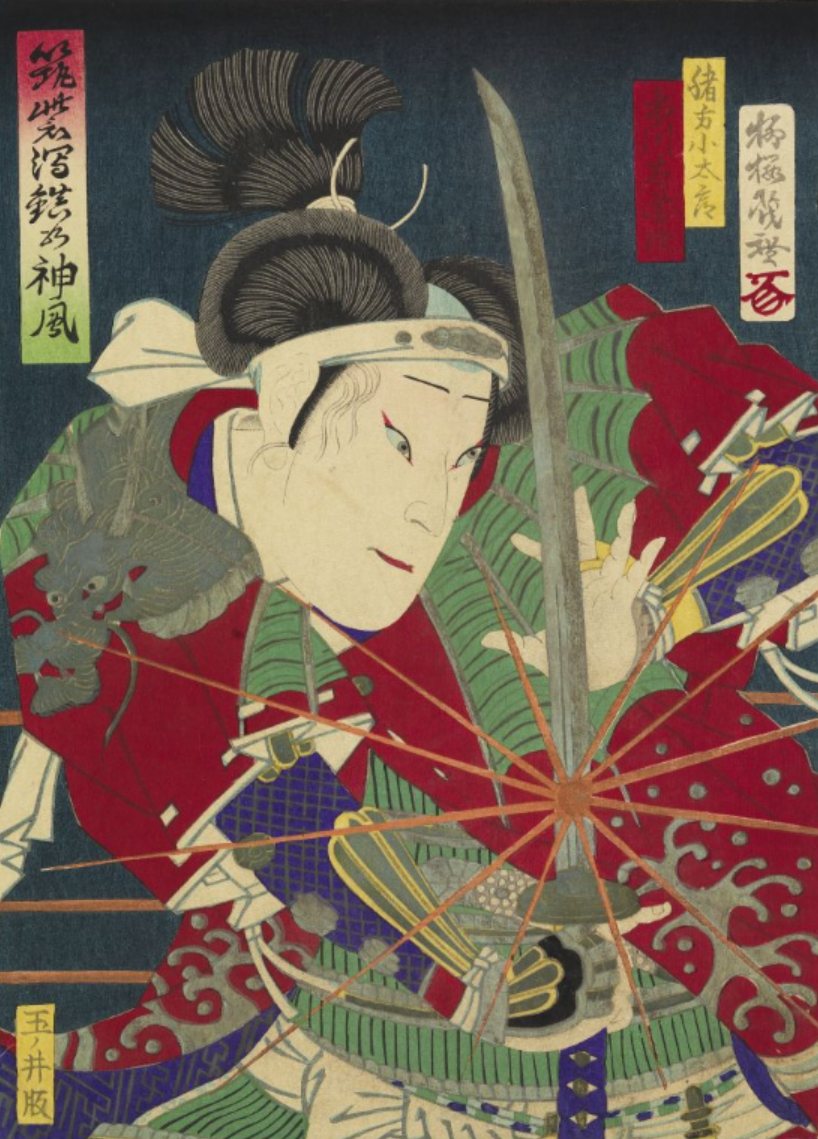
A depiction of Ogata Kotarō, whose prison writings were studied by Ishihara Shiko'o.

Ishihara Shiko'o (Japanese: 石原 醜男; 1874–1936) was a Japanese historian, educator, and author.

== Biography ==
Ishihara Shiko'o was born near the coal mining town of Arao in what was then the Tamana District of Kumamoto Prefecture. His father was Ishihara Unshirō (石原 運四郎) (1841-1876), a former samurai retainer of the Kumamoto Domain and staff officer attached to the 2nd Regiment of the Keishintō (敬神党), an anti-foreign organization established by students of the kokugaku leader Hayashi Ōen. Hayashi was known for his intense and vehement hatred of Western technology, believing it offensive to the kami. In 1876, when Ishihara was two years old, his father participated in the Keishintō's night attack on Kumamoto Castle. Although he escaped the castle alive, Unshirō chose to commit seppuku alongside a friend after the uprising's defeat by forces under Kodama Gentarō. The young Ishihara was present when military police later arrived to search the family house, and he was thereafter raised by his mother and grandmother.

Ishihara was distraught that the Keishintō would be forgotten while still branded rebels, and devoted his life to gathering historical materials and testimony from surviving relatives of the men involved and investigating the truth of the uprising. Manuscripts collected by Ishihara included the Sorrowful Draft from Prison (獄の憂草, Goku no Yūsō), a brief account of the rebellion's planning and execution by the captured participant Ogata Kotarō. In 1935, the results of his studies were published under the name League of the Divine Wind: A History of Blood and Tears (神風連血涙史, Shinpūren Ketsuruishi). He was also a member of the Sakurayama Dōshikai (桜山同志会), an association for the support of relatives of Keishintō members and general education about the rebellion.

Near the end of his life, Ishihara exchanged letters with Tokutomi Sohō on several occasions. He died in 1936.

== Legacy ==
Many of the documents collected by Ishihara were preserved at the Shinpūren Archive of the Sakurayama Shrine in Kumamoto. Ishihara's work was expounded upon by Hasuda Zenmei, one of the last kokugaku students and an early influence on the author Yukio Mishima. Later in the 20th century, material from the Sakurayama archive was examined by the historian Araki Seishi. During the late 1960s, Araki collaborated with Yukio Mishima in the latter's preliminary research for the historical fiction novel Runaway Horses, which contains a dramatic depiction of the Shinpūren rebellion modeled on Ishihara's text and attributed to the fictional "Yamao Tsunanori" (山尾 綱紀).

Because of the low-volume first publication, copies of Shinpūren Ketsuruishi were difficult to obtain even before the Second World War. During the occupation, the book was one of many denounced as reactionary. It was subsequently marked for confiscation and destruction by the Civil Censorship Detachment, but no copies are known to have been seized. In 1977, Shinpūren Ketsuruishi was republished in limited numbers. Under the copyright law of Japan, the text of Shinpūren Ketsuruishi is now in the public domain.

Alongside the few other surviving early accounts of the Shinpūren rebellion, Shinpūren Ketsuruishi has been described as a "hagiography" because of its sympathetic tone and heroic presentation of the rebels' deeds.

== Bibliography ==
- 石原 Ishihara, 醜男 Shiko'o. "神風連血涙史 Shinpūren Ketsuruishi". National Diet Library of Japan.

== See also ==
- Koyama Hagyaku
