= Takayoshi Sekiguchi =

Japanese policeman and politician (1836–1889)

Junior Third Rank Takayoshi Sekiguchi
- 関口 隆吉
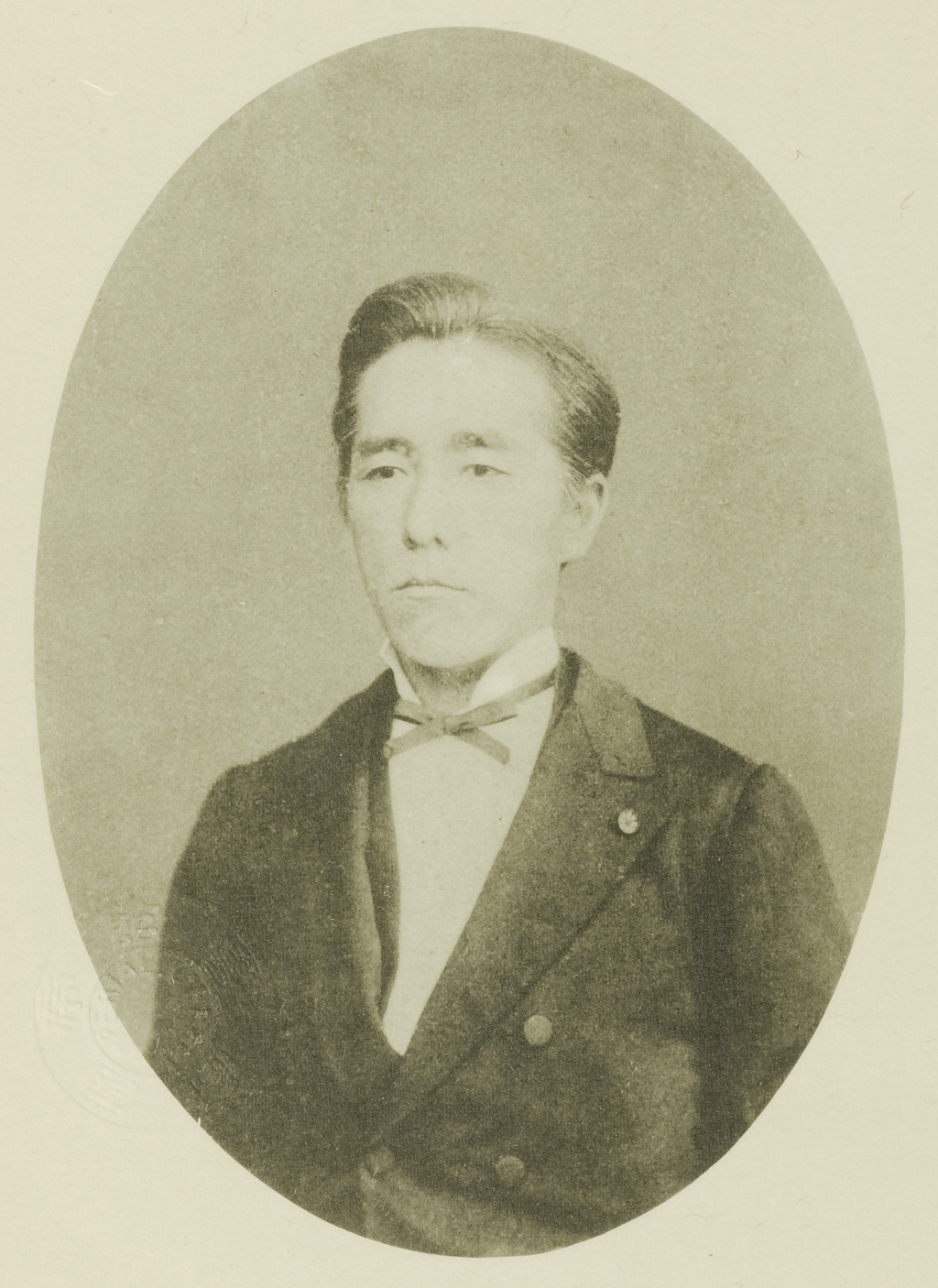

Governor of Shizuoka Prefecture
- In office September 27, 1884 – June 8, 1889
- Monarch: Meiji
- Preceded by: Office established
- Succeeded by: Tokito Tamemoto

Governor of Yamaguchi Prefecture
- In office December 27, 1875 – February 12, 1881
- Monarch: Meiji
- Preceded by: Nakano Goichi
- Succeeded by: Taro Hara

Personal details
- Born: October 26, 1836 Honjo, Edo, Japan
- Died: May 17, 1889 (aged 52) Japan
- Cause of death: Tetanus
- Children: Shinmura Izuru

Military service
- Allegiance: Empire of Japan
- Branch: Imperial Japanese Army
- Years of service: 1874–1887
- Battles/wars: Hagi Rebellion

Takayoshi Sekiguchi (1836-1889) was a Japanese policeman and politician in the Edo Period and the first Governor of the Shizuoka Prefecture. He was one of the founders of Shizuoka Girls' School.

== Biography ==
=== Childhood ===
In 1836, he was born in Aio-cho, Honjo, Edo, as the second son of the Shogunate vassal Sekiguchi Takafune. The Sekiguchi family was descendants of the Imamkawa family, and his father, Takafune, was from Ikemiya Shrine in Sakura Village (present-day Sakura, Omaezaki, Shizuoka Prefecture).

In 1838, his father Takafune was entrusted with the power of his father and moved to Ushigushi akagi-cho.

In 1848, he entered Saito Yakuro's Nerimakan. At that time, the head of the Training Hall was Kido Takayoshi, who became a brother-like figure to Sekiguchi.

=== Bakumatsu Era ===
In 1850, he turned 15 years old and indulged in Genpuku. In 1852, at the age of 17, he succeeded his father and was a bowing power. In 1853, he studied military law under as a subordinate of Morisetsu Yoshihara. In 1858, he was introduced to the ideals of Confucian scholar Ohashi Tokuan and was devoted to Sonnojoi. Around this time, he had exchanges with the likes of Kusaka Genzui and Yozaburo Kaneko. In 1859, at the age of 24, he married the daughter of his samurai teacher, Torataro Ino, but were divorced on October 17, 1860.

In 1862, he handed over the position of Yoriki Momochi to his brother-in-law, Kanejiro. This was to avoid allegations that he had attacked Andō Nobumasa during the Weirdness outside Sakashitamon in the same year. In 1863, at the age of 28, Sekiguchi married Yamada Soya's daughter, Mutsumi (who was later known as Aya).

In 1862, he gave up the position of bowing power to. In 1867, he attempted to assassinate Katsu Kaishū, a nation-selogist, but cancelled the attempt. Katsu nicknamed Takayoshi "Tosai" and they later on became best friends. He was the subject of the restoration of the great government in the same year.

=== Meiji Restoration ===
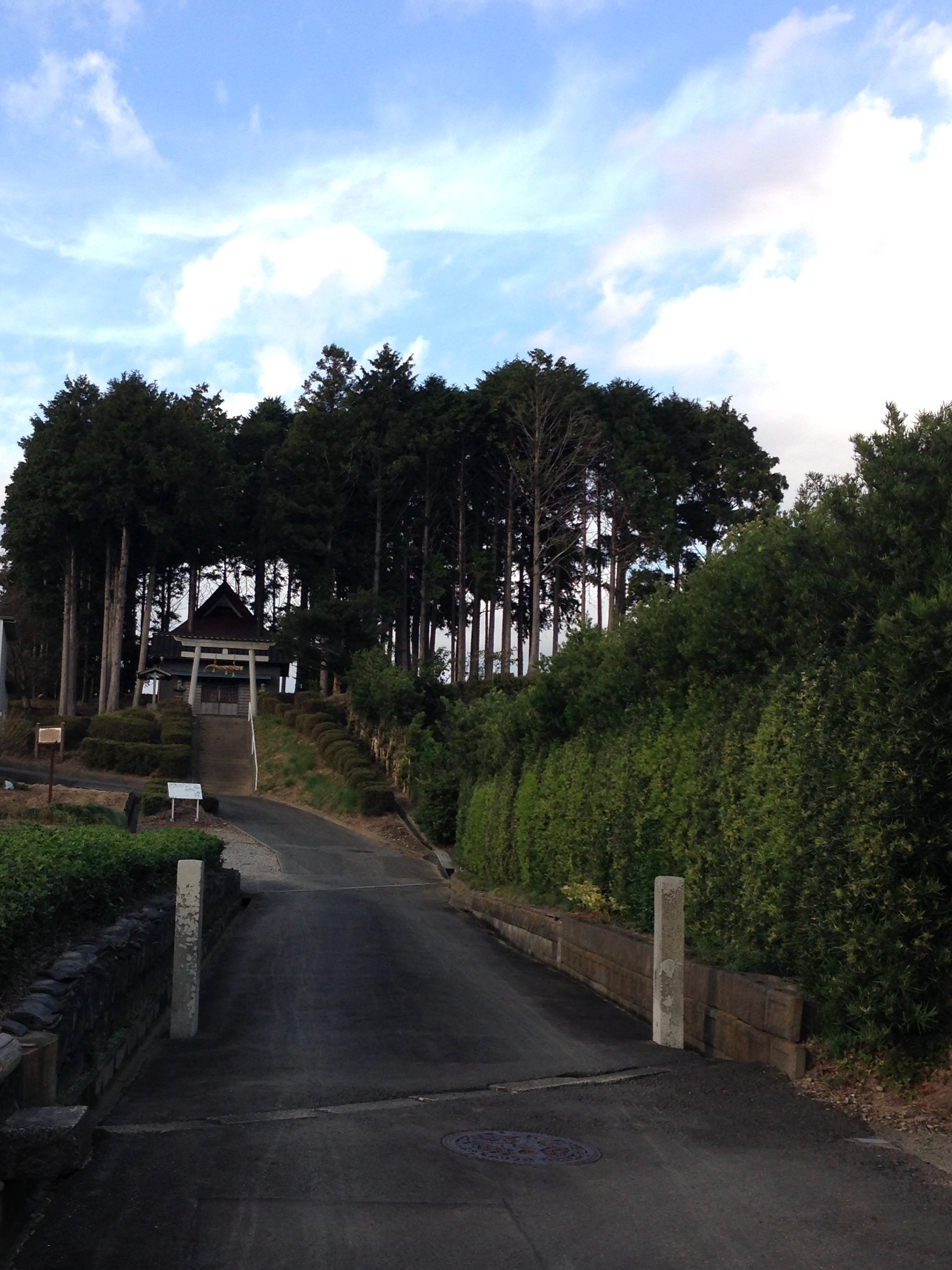
Tsukioka Yaho Shrine (Modern-Day Kikugawa, Shizuoka Prefecture) There are ruins of Sekiguchi's mansion and a memorial monument.

In 1868, he served as the chief of the Tokugawa Yoshinobu Goshoshinsho, as well as the head of the Elite Body Guard Corps and the head of the town magistrates' control, and served as keiki's guard. He also attended the Edo Castle's passing, became the head of the city board, signed an alliance with Katsu Kaishū, Yamaoka Tesshū, and Matsuoka Yorozu, and moved Tokugawa Yoshinobu to Suruga, and worked hard to process the postwar period at the end of the Tokugawa shogunate and established a new era.

In 1870, the family moved to Tsukioka in Enjoto-gun where Keiki was located (Modern-day Kikukawa, Shizuoka Prefecture), became a kanaya reclamation head, and started reclamation of the Makinohara Plateau and the Ochaen construction project with the former shogunate vassals who emigrated. Takayoshi went from Tsukaoka to Makinohara by horse.

=== County Magistrate Era ===
In 1871, he was asked by the Meiji government to serve in the government of the abandoned feudal domain, and went to Tokyo.

He served as a counselor in the Mizuma Prefecture (present-day Fukuoka Prefecture), and the counselor of the Okitama Prefecture (present-day Yamagata Prefecture), and served in the County magistrate as the second prepresentative of the Yamagata Prefecture from 1873 to 1875 and would continue service from 1875 to 1881. In 1876, during the Yamaguchi Prefectural Ordinance, the Hagi Rebellion of Maebara Issei and Kensuke Okudaira was suppressed and was called the "Kenken Prefectural Ordinance of Yamaguchi". In the same year, his eldest son Sokichi was born in Tsukioka.

In 1881, at the age of 46, he became a member of the Senate and moved to Tokyo, and as a local tour officer, he conducted surveys of five prefectures (Tokyo, Chiba, Ibaraki, Kanagawa, Shizuoka, and Aichi). He served as a judge at the High Court and the Third Shizuoka Prefectural Ordinance (1884 - 1886). At that time, Sekiguchi's inauguration as a prefectural ordinance in Shizuoka Prefecture was unusual because there was a rule that "local ordinances apply to other things", that is, it was not possible to take office as a prefectural ordinance in the land related to the source.

Since becoming a prefectural ordinance in Shizuoka Prefecture, he has been working on the hydraulic control project, and has been promoting the construction of tunnels on Tongu Shrine Mountain (present-day Iwata), which draws agricultural water from the Tenryū River to the Chuto region, the construction of the Numagawa Stone Suimen Gate to prevent salt damage in Fuji District, and the construction of a new prefectural government building. With the aim of collecting and utilizing books, he also planned the creation of a library called "Kuno Bunko" at the Kunōzan Tōshō-gū at his own expense.

=== Governor of Shizuoka Prefecture ===
In 1886, he was appointed the first governor of Shizuoka Prefecture by the promulgated local government system. Sekiguchi, who recognized the usefulness of the use of books as a political figure, had come up with the concept of the Kuno Bunko, a self-owned library, in the Kuno Bunko Construction No Advertisement from an early age.

In 1887, together with Shizuoka Church pastor Yoshiyasu Hiraiwa, founded the first private girls' educational institution in Shizuoka Prefecture with the Shizuoka Girls' School. The first principal was Miss M.J. Caninham. In 1887, he visited Toyo Eiwa Jogakuin in the founding of the Shizuoka Girls' School (later Shizuoka Eiwa Jogakuin). At that time, the second daughter Manju was a student of Toyo Eiwa Jogakuin. Not remembering his daughter's school name, he visited without knowing he had a daughter enrolled there.

On April 11, 1889, he was connected to a freight train for the construction of the Tōkaidō Main Line, which he worked hard to build for his seat at the 3rd Division's Invitational Festival in Nagoya. While riding in a passenger car, Sekiguchi suffered a head-on collision with another train, and a piece of steel from the freight car pierced his leg, seriously injuring his bruised left ankle. Despite the required amputation of his right leg, Sekiguchi refused to do so, resulting in fatal Tetanus from the wound that resulted in his death on May 17 of the same year.

In Sekiguchi's Death Poem Song, he wrote the following:

The world is a box of balls in Urashima, and it is a short night in summer when it is open.

== Legacy ==
- In honor of Sekiguchi's achievements, a bronze statue was built in front of Kikukawa Station on January 17, 2020. The sculptor was Naomi Tsutsumi.

== Awards and honors ==
=== Court Titles ===
- Senior Sixth Rank (1874)
- Junior Fifth Rank (1881)
- Senior Fourth Rank (November 16, 1886)
- Junior Third Rank (April 17, 1889)

=== Awards ===
- Order of the Fourth Class (1877)
- Order of the Rising Sun, Fourth Class, Gold Rays with Rosette (February 10, 1882)
- Order of the Rising Sun, Third Class (October 28, 1882)
- Medal of Honor, Yellow (July 21, 1887)

== Family ==
- Wife, Mutsumi (renamed Aya tea ceremony later tsung徧流authentic biography hermitage VI of Yamada SoWataru daughter)
- Eldest son Sokichi Sekiguchi ( first principal of Hamamatsu Advanced Institute of Technology)
- Second son Shinmura Izuru ( Linguist and philologist . Known as the editor of "Kojien".)
- Third son Shuzo Kato
- Fourth son Rikichi Sekiguchi (astronomer/meteorologist)
- Eldest daughter Misao Sekiguchi
- Second daughter Manju Sekiguchi
- Chiyoko Sekiguchi Takamasa Sekiguchi ( 3rd owner of Shizuoka Girls' School, Han scholar )

== Bibliography ==
- Yagi, Shigeki, "The Life of Takakichi Sekiguchi: The Hidden Great Master of the End of the Edo Period and the Restoration," Midorikage Shobo, August 1, 1983. ISBN 978-4-89774-201-4
- Takayoshi Sekiguchi Former Collection of Letters of Celebrities in the Early Meiji Era " Shizuoka Prefectural Central Library / Edition, Shizuoka Prefectural Central Library, 1983.
- Encyclopedia of Flag Headquarters after Kanseifu" Kyoichi Ogawa / ed., Toyo Shorin, 1997.
- Michio Mitooka, Nagato Horiuchi "The Life of the First Governor of Shizuoka Prefecture, Ryukichi Sekiguchi" Shizuoka Shimbun, June 4, 2019. ISBN 978-4-7838-1082-7
- "Shizuoka's ancestors" Shizuoka Prefectural Citizen's Department Cultural Science Bureau Cultural Policy Office / Edition, Shizuoka Prefecture, 2009.
- "Since the Meiji era, Nishikusabuka Residents' Late Celebrity Koden" Nishikusabuka Neighborhood Association, Shizuoka Prefectural Library collection.
- "A collection of Shizuoka-cho split pictures in the first half of the Meiji era" Shizuoka Local Publishing Co., Ltd., 1989.
- Shintaro Sakurai, "History of People in Shizuoka", Kurofune Kobo, January 10, 1962.
