= Fukuhara Toyonori =

Imperial Japanese Army general

- 福原豊功
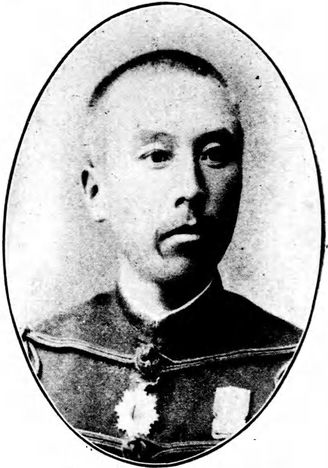
- Born: August 10, 1852; Kyoto, Chōshū Domain, Tokugawa shogunate
- Died: July 27, 1895 (aged 42); Japan
- Burial place: Yasukuni Shrine, Chiyoda, Tokyo
- Military career
- Allegiance: Chōshū Domain; Japan
- Branch: Imperial Japanese Army
- Service years: 1868 – 1895
- Rank: Major General
- Commands: 12th Kumamoto Garrison Infantry Regiment; 13th Infantry Regiment; 18th Infantry Regiment; 8th Infantry Brigade
- Conflicts: Boshin War; Satsuma Rebellion; Shinpūren rebellion First Sino-Japanese War

Fukuhara Toyonori (福原豊功, Toyonori Fukuhara; August 10, 1852 – July 27, 1895) was a 19th-century Japanese major general in the Imperial Japanese Army.

== Biography ==
Born as the second son of Fukuhara Yosabei Seimin, Toyonori was a resident of the Chōshū Domain in Kyoto. Toyonori served in the Boshin War as a Kiheitai soldier and transferred to the Tōhoku region. In 1869, Fukuhara traveled to the United Kingdom. In 1870, he was appointed as a 4th officer of the battalion and a warrant officer of the Imperial Japanese Army, and was assigned to Konoe. Toyonori served in Taiwan as a company commander of the 12th Kumamoto Garrison Infantry Regiment. In addition, he participated in the Satsuma Rebellion from February to October 1877.

In November 1887, he was promoted to Colonel of the Army after working as a commander of the 13th Infantry Regiment, a staff member of Kumamoto Garrison, Osaka Garrison, Chubu Garrison, and Tokyo Garrison, and a commander of the 18th Infantry Regiment. In August 1894, he was promoted to Major General of the Army after serving as Chief of Staff of the 2nd Regiment of Konoe Infantry, Chief of Staff of the 5th Division, and Chief of Staff of the 6th Division. After serving as the 8th Infantry Brigade Commander, he set sail as a Southern Logistics Officer at the end of the First Sino-Japanese War and became Chief of Staff of the Occupied Territories after the war, but died of illness due to Cholera in July 1895. Toyonori was enshrined in the Yasukuni Shrine on September 30, 1898.

== Awards ==
- Order of the Rising Sun, 3rd Class (November 19, 1885)
- Order of the Rising Run, 2nd Class (July 26, 1895)

== Bibliography ==
- Ikuhiko Hata ed., "Japan Army and Navy Comprehensive Encyclopedia", 2nd edition, University of Tokyo Press, 2005.
- Hideki Fukukawa, "Dictionary of Generals of the Japanese Army", Fuyo Shobo Publishing Co., Ltd., 2001.
- Misao Toyama, "Army General Personnel Overview, Army Edition," Fuyo Shobo Publishing Co., Ltd., 1981.
