= Nagase Masaki =

- 長瀬 真幸

Personal details
- Born: 1765
- Died: June 23, 1835 (aged 69–70)

Nagase Masaki (長瀬 真幸; 1765–1835) was a scholar of Japanese literature, kokugakusha, and samurai retainer of the Kumamoto Domain. His common name was Shichirōhei (七郎平), and he also used the noms de plume Tabuse (田廬) and Sōmatsu'en (双松園).

== Biography ==
The young Nagase Masaki studied under the Confucian scholar Kusano Senkei (草野 潜渓). His father, Nagase Masatsune (長瀬 正常), taught him about the etiquette, language, and practices of the kuge. From Moriyama Hirotoyo (守山 広豊), a Shinto priest associated with a branch of Usa Jingū, Masaki learned about the Shinto tradition handed down by the Tachibana lineage.

Masaki travelled to Edo and is known to have collaborated with Hanawa Hokiichi.

Masaki believed that "kokugaku is the research and clarification of the ancient lexicon and the events of antiquity, and through this study rediscovering the Age of the Gods". He had a number of students, including Nakajima Hirotari and Hayashi Ōen.
