= Shizoku =

Social class in Japan

The Shizoku (士族; "warrior families") was a social class in Japan composed of former samurai after the Meiji Restoration from 1869 to 1947. Shizoku was a distinct class between the kazoku (a merger of the former kuge and daimyō classes) and heimin (commoners) with no special class privileges, and the title was solely on the register. The Shizoku were abolished in the revised civil code in 1947 after the Japanese defeat in World War II.

== History ==
=== Origins ===
In 1868, the Meiji Restoration was launched to overthrow the Tokugawa Shogunate that had ruled Japan as a feudal state since 1600, known as the Edo period, and restore practical rule to the Emperor of Japan. One of the main objectives of the Imperial revolutionaries was the abolition of feudalism, including the Tokugawa class system which assigned most people in Japan into a strict class hierarchy. The new Meiji oligarchs of Japan required the daimyo, the feudal lords of the noble samurai warrior class, and their han (domains) to be abolished. In 1869, the daimyo of the pro-Meiji Satsuma and Chōshū domains agreed to make a formal declaration of returning their land and population registers to the Emperor, with the understanding that he would then confirm their holdings as prefectural governors. The Meiji government merged the former kuge and daimyō noble classes into the kazoku as a new Meiji nobility, while all the samurai retainers of the daimyo were put into a single category above the level of commoners. This new class, the shizoku meaning "warrior families", possessed no class privileges and their recognition was limited to the government register, effectively making them commoners. In 1871, the Meiji oligarchs abolished the 270 remaining domains of the daimyo and established the prefectures in their place as new administrative divisions. All the shizoku received were small stipends which were later changed to government bonds, and the Meiji oligarchs urged them to find other lines of work in agriculture, forestry, business and the colonization of Hokkaido.

=== Shizoku rebellions ===
Many former samurai succeeded in adjusting to the new Japanese society, but many did not and soon found themselves losing their incomes, status, and purpose. A large number of shizoku were angered by their treatment from the Meiji government, including those that had supported the Meiji Restoration and fought in the Boshin War. They were disappointed that social reform had benefited the high-ranking nobility and commoners but severely disadvantaged most of the samurai. As a result, radical counterrevolutionary sentiment began to develop among the disillusioned shizoku, particularly in hope of overthrowing the new government while it was weak and restoring the shogunate.

In January 1873, the Meiji government issued a conscription ordinance crafted by Yamagata Aritomo based on German and French models. All Japanese males over the age of twenty were summoned to serve on active duty in the new Imperial Japanese Army or Imperial Japanese Navy for three years, followed by four years in the reserves. The shizoku were bitterly opposed to conscription, leading to demonstrations in sixteen localities in the months after the ordinance's announcement. Many disillusioned and conservative former samurai were further angered that their societal function as a noble warrior class had not only been removed, but replaced with an army of commoners.

The shizoku launched more than thirty rebellions of various sizes against the Meiji government in Kyushu and western Honshu between 1874 and 1877. The Saga Rebellion began in February 1874 when former samurai of the Saga Domain rebelled after the government declined to launch a military expedition against Korea, a major political debate in Japan known as the Seikanron. Many anti-Meiji shizoku believed that an invasion of Korea would help restore the prestige and purpose of the samurai class. The rebellion was crushed two months later, but sympathy for the rebels among the shizoku was high and the issues remained unresolved. On 24 October 1876, the Shinpūren rebellion was launched by the Shinpūren, an organization of radical anti-Meiji former samurai of the Kumamoto Domain. Their leader, Otaguro Tomoo, appealed to regional shizoku to join their cause. The Shinpūren rebellion was defeated by the next morning, but the surprising number of casualties inflicted on the Imperial Japanese Army and Kumamoto Prefecture officials inspired other shizoku to rebel. The Akizuki rebellion was launched on 27 October and the Hagi Rebellion on 28 October, both of which were defeated. The Satsuma Rebellion, the largest and last of the shizoku rebellions, occurred in Satsuma Domain under the leadership of Saigō Takamori. The massive rebellion required the mobilization of 65,000 Imperial Japanese Army troops and took eight months to suppress. Saigō committed seppuku after being mortally wounded and defeat of the rebellion effectively ended the samurai as an unofficial class. In 1878, the shizoku counterrevolution ended with the assassination of the oligarch Ōkubo Toshimichi, also from Satsuma, because he had opposed invading Korea and reforms installed by the Meiji state.

In 1880, the Meiji government faced financial disaster as it had printed money recklessly during the 1870s to finance its projects, and private banks issued their own notes. It had spent heavily suppressing shizoku rebellions, and was one of the reasons why Japan faced the most serious economic crisis of the Meiji period.

== See also ==
- Glossary of Japanese history: S
