= Otagi Michiteru =

Japanese kuge and bureaucrat

- 愛宕 通旭

Personal details
- Born: November 27, 1846; Kyoto, Yamashiro Province, Japan
- Died: January 12, 1872 (aged 25); Japan
- Cause of death: Suicide

Otagi Michiteru (Japanese: 愛宕 通旭; 1846-1872) was a Japanese kuge and bureaucrat.

== Biography ==
Otagi Michiteru was born in 1846. His father was Koga Takemichi of the Interior Ministry. Later, he was adopted by Otagi Michimune and adopted the Otagi family name.

At the outbreak of the Boshin War in 1868, Otagi was incorporated into the bureaucracy of the Imperial Japanese Army and later also the Jingikan. In 1869, he was laid off as a result of the cash-strapped government's personnel reductions.

Otagi was outraged by both the soaring cost of living and the Westernization that became widespread after the restoration of the monarchy. He allied with Toyama Mitsusuke to plot the overthrow of the government. However, Otagi and Toyama were arrested in Tokyo on May 3, 1871, after their comrades betrayed them by tipping the police off to their plans. Among those arrested alongside Otagi was Kaya Harukata. The scandal caused by the exposure of their plot became known as the Two Lords Incident. Otagi was ordered to perform harakiri on December 3 of the same year and killed himself a month later.
