= Akizuki rebellion =

- Part of the Shizoku rebellions of the Meiji period
Date	27 October 1876 – 24 November 1876
Location	Akizuki, Fukuoka Prefecture, Japan
Result	Government victory

Belligerents
(Empire of Japan) Meiji Government of Japan: (Empire of Japan) Imperial Japanese Army	Kanjōtai: Samurai of the Akizuki Domain

Commanders and leaders
(Empire of Japan) Nogi Maresuke	Iso Jun †; Toki Kiyoshi †; Masuda Shizukata †; Miyazaki Kurumanosuke †; Imamura Hyakuhachirō †

Strength
14th Infantry Regiment; 1st & 3rd Police Battalion Companies	870 Akizuki rebels

Casualties and losses
5+ killed (at least 2 soldiers, 2 civilians, 1 policeman)	24 killed (killed and suicide); 2 executed 150 arrested

The Akizuki rebellion (秋月の乱, Akizuki no ran) was an uprising against the Meiji government of Japan that occurred in Akizuki from 27 October 1876 to 24 November 1876.

Former samurai of the Akizuki Domain, opposed to the Westernization of Japan and loss of their class privileges after the Meiji Restoration, launched an uprising inspired by the failed Shinpūren rebellion three days earlier. The Akizuki rebels attacked local police before being suppressed by the Imperial Japanese Army, and the leaders of the rebellion committed seppuku or were executed.

The Akizuki rebellion was one of a number of "shizoku uprisings" which took place in Kyūshū and western Honshu during the early Meiji period.

== Background ==
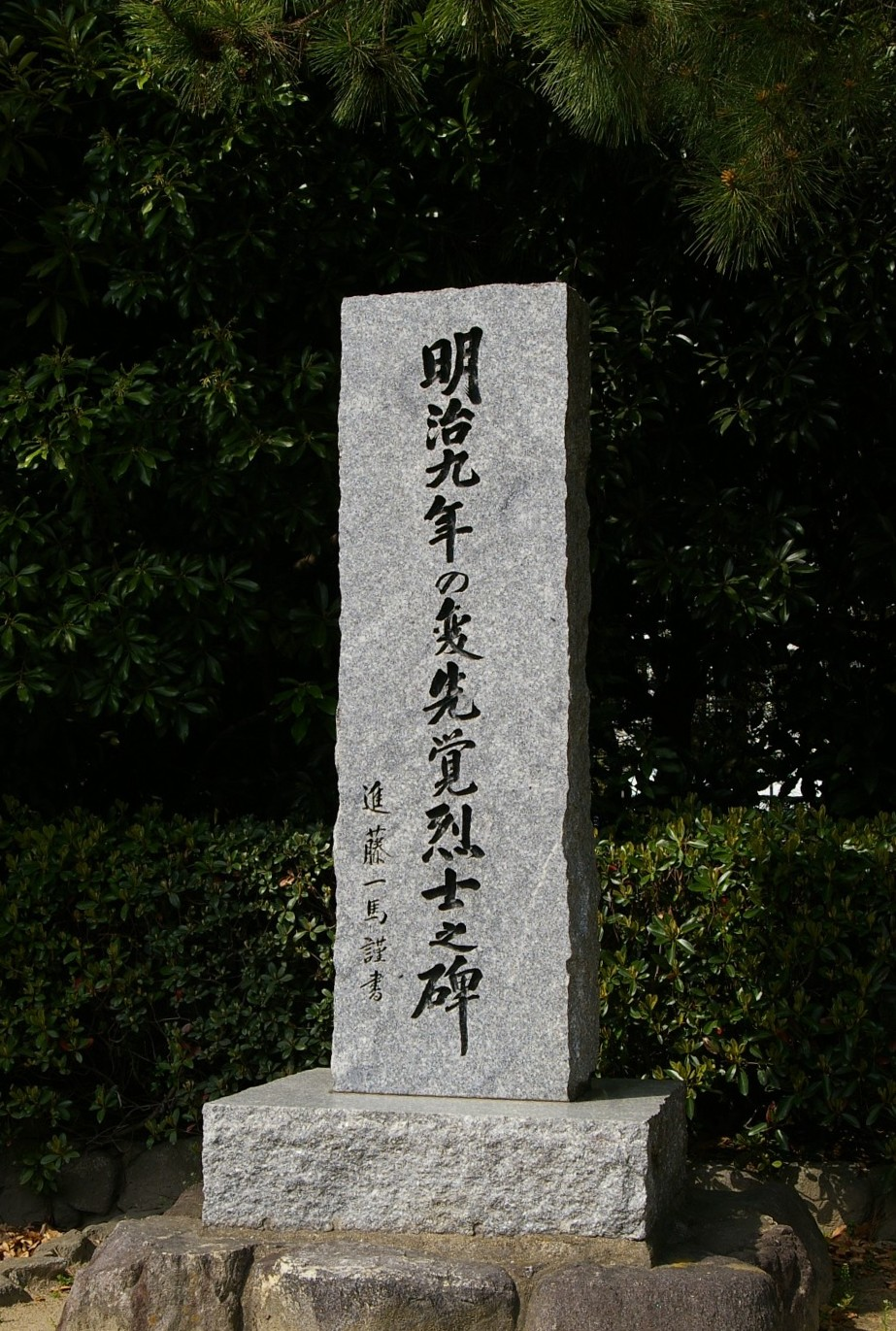
Meiji kunen no henn Senkaku resshi no hi in Hakozaki Shrine

In 1868, the Meiji Restoration established the Empire of Japan and overthrew the Tokugawa Shogunate that had ruled Japan as a feudal state since 1600. The new Meiji government enacted policies of modernization and Westernization, including reforms aimed at deconstructing feudalism in Japan such as the abolition of the han system and the Tokugawa class system. Many conservative members of the samurai, the former powerful warrior class, were disgruntled as the reforms saw them lose their privileged social status, eliminating their income, and the establishment of universal military conscription had replaced much of their role in the society. The very rapid modernization and Westernization of Japan was resulting in massive changes to Japanese culture, dress and society, and appeared to many samurai to be a betrayal of the "joi " ("Expel the Barbarian") portion of the Sonnō jōi justification used to overthrow the former Tokugawa shogunate.

On 24 October 1876, the Shinpūren rebellion was launched by the Shinpūren, a radical anti-Meiji samurai organization in Kumamoto, against the Imperial Japanese Army and officials of Kumamoto Prefecture. The Shinpūren rebels managed to inflict a surprising amount of damage to the army and Meiji officials, including the assassination of the Governor of Kumamoto Prefecture and the commander of the army's Kumamoto garrison. The Shinpūren rebellion was defeated by the next morning, but despite its failure the initial success inspired many anti-Meiji samurai in Kyūshū to launch their own rebellions.

== Uprising ==
On 27 October 1876, ex-samurai of the former Akizuki Domain in Chikuzen Province, now part of the Meiji Fukuoka Prefecture, launched an uprising in response to a call to action by the leaders of the Shinpūren rebellion three days earlier. The Akizuki rebels were led by five ex-samurai retainers of the Akizuki Domain who had formed an anti-Meiji political society called the Kanjōtai: Iso Jun, Toki Kiyoshi, Masuda Shizukata, Imamura Hyakuhachirō, and Miyazaki Kurumanosuke. The main points of contention for the Kanjōtai were the ban on carrying swords, the government's refusal to follow Shimazu Hisamitsu's advice to halt the Westernization of the country, and especially the outcome of the Seikanron debate over invasion of Korea in 1873. The Kanjōtai's strong advocacy of overseas expansionism was rooted in the belief that such a war would spur the need for samurai warriors and restore the former samurai class to its former prominence and prestige, and the Meiji government's decision not to invade Korea had further angered them. Iso, Miyazaki and the other leaders of the Akizuki rebellion sought to enlist support from other local shizoku – the new social class of former samurai above commoners but with no special privileges.

The Akizuki rebels managed to gather a band of roughly 400 men from northern Kyushu, but not all agreed with Miyazaki's plan to march to the aid of the Shinpūren rebels. Eventually, only 200 men set off with the Akizuki rebels, under a white banner with the kanji Recompense the Country (報国, Hōkoku). The revolt began with the killing of police officers at their post at Myōgan-ji, a local Buddhist temple. The rebels meant to rendezvous with a band of shizoku from the former Toyotsu Domain under Sugyu Jūrō, and arrived at the rendezvous point on October 29 only to learn that their compatriots had already been arrested and imprisoned. The rebels were then attacked by the Kokura garrison of the Imperial Japanese Army, under the command of Nogi Maresuke. Seventeen rebels and two government soldiers were killed. The rebels were chased into the hills, where, on October 31, Iso, Miyazaki, Toki, and four others committed seppuku. Meanwhile, Imamura led twenty-six warriors back to Akizuki, where they raided the elementary school and killed two government officials. They then burned down a liquor shop's storehouse where rebels had been previously detained, but by November 24, all the rebels were apprehended.

== Aftermath ==
Masuda Shizukata had left for the former Saga Domain in an attempt to raise support among the warriors there, but was apprehended on his way back to Akizuki on 26 October, even before his compatriots began their uprising. On 3 December, the surviving Akizuki rebels were brought before a temporary military tribunal in Fukuoka Prefecture. Imamura and Masuda were sentenced to death and beheaded the same day, and 150 of their compatriots were sentenced to hard labor. Akizuki Castle, the former capital building of the Akizuki Domain, was torn down shortly afterwards in response to the rebellion.

The Akizuki rebellion holds the distinction of being the first time in Japanese history that a member of the modern police force was killed in the line of duty.

== See also ==
- Glossary of Japanese history
- Hagi Rebellion
- Saga Rebellion
- Shinpūren Rebellion
- Satsuma Rebellion
