= Araki Seishi =

Japanese novelist

- 荒木 精之

Personal details
- Born: January 7, 1907 Kikuchi, Kumamoto Prefecture, Empire of Japan
- Died: December 30, 1981 (aged 74) Kumamoto, Japan
- Occupation: Historian

Araki Seishi (荒木 精之; 1907-1981) was an eccentric Japanese historian, novelist, and publisher.

== Early life ==
Araki Seishi was born the eldest son of Araki Tamijirō (荒木民次郎), principal of the Chōyō Elementary School in Kumamoto Prefecture.

In 1935, while teaching at his mother in law's school in Kikuchi, Araki published the novel Environment and Blood (環境と血, Kankyō to ketsu), but it was banned immediately after its first publishing on the grounds that it promoted liberalism and corrupted public morals.

== Wartime activity ==
In late 1944, Araki was pressed into service digging underground air raid shelters on the island of Ōyano-jima. In 1945, he was involved as a laborer in construction at the Kumamoto Military Airfield. On August 17, 1945, Araki and a number of friends gathered at the Fujisaki Hachimangū shrine and formed the Loyalist Militia (尊皇義勇軍, Sonnō giyūgun), also called the "Shōwa Shinpūren" (昭和神風連), a resistance movement with the stated objective of defending Kumamoto to the death from the Allied occupation army. However, they quickly surrendered to the Americans and the militia was disarmed without any fighting.

== Postwar ==
In 1946, Araki opened a bookstore and resumed writing. He was later involved in the memorialization of Kumamoto landmarks, including the former residence of Lafcadio Hearn, as well as local archival and historiographical research and preservation. Araki was an authority on the history of the Shinpūren rebellion. In the 1960s, he collaborated with Yukio Mishima's preparatory research for The Sea of Fertility.

Araki died of an intracranial hemorrhage at the Kumamoto University Hospital in 1981.
