= Hagi Rebellion =

1876 failed Japanese revolt

- Part of the Shizoku rebellions of the Meiji period
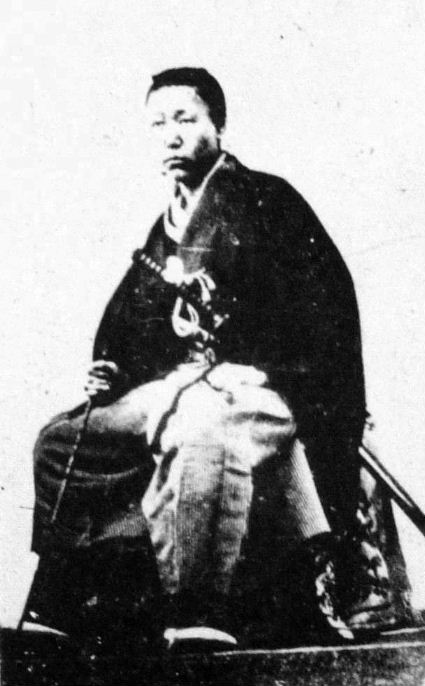
- Maebara Issei, leader of the rebellion
Date	28 October 1876 – 5 November 1876 (1 week, 1 day)
Location	Hagi, Yamaguchi Prefecture, Japan
Result	Government victory

Belligerents
(Empire of Japan) Meiji Government: (Empire of Japan) Imperial Japanese Army	Juntoku: Samurai of the Chōshū Domain

Commanders and leaders
Miura Gorō; Takayoshi Sekiguchi	Maebara Issei †; Kensuke Okudaira †

Strength
109,379 Imperial soldiers (Note: 38 infantry regiments, 12 battalions, and 1 artillery platoon.)	200 Hagi samurai

Casualties and losses
178 killed 284 wounded	102 killed 49 executed

The Hagi Rebellion (萩の乱, Hagi no ran) was an uprising against the Meiji government of Japan that occurred in Hagi from 28 October 1876 to 5 November 1876.

Maebara Issei, a disillusioned hero of the Meiji Restoration and former samurai of the Chōshū Domain, planned an attack on Yamaguchi Prefecture officials inspired by the Shinpūren rebellion four days earlier. Maebara's plot was exposed and his supporters in Hagi were soon defeated by the Imperial Japanese Army as he travelled the Chūgoku region searching for support. Maebara and the leaders of the rebellion were arrested and executed.

The Hagi Rebellion was one of a number of "shizoku uprisings" which took place in Kyūshū and western Honshu during the early Meiji period.

== Background ==
In 1868, the Meiji Restoration established the Empire of Japan and overthrew the Tokugawa Shogunate that had ruled Japan as a feudal state since 1600. The new Meiji government enacted policies of modernization and Westernization, including reforms aimed at deconstructing feudalism in Japan such as the abolition of the han system and the Tokugawa class system. Many conservative members of the samurai, the former powerful warrior class, were disgruntled as the reforms saw them lose their privileged social status, eliminating their income, and the establishment of universal military conscription had replaced much of their role in the society. The very rapid modernization and Westernization of Japan was resulting in massive changes to Japanese culture, dress and society, and appeared to many samurai to be a betrayal of the "joi " ("Expel the Barbarian") portion of the Sonnō jōi justification used to overthrow the former Tokugawa Shogunate.

Maebara Issei, one of the heroes of the Meiji restoration and a leader of the Imperial Army at the Battle of Aizu, was among the dissatisfied of the Imperial faction. Maebara was a samurai of the Chōshū Domain, one of the most powerful domains, which the Imperial revolutionaries had gained crucial support from after brokering the Satchō Alliance through the mediation of Sakamoto Ryōma. Maebara had been a pupil of Yoshida Shōin and an early advocate of modernization in Japan, rising to the post of Military Minister in the new Meiji government after the Restoration. However, Maebara eventually resigned due to disagreements with Kido Takayoshi over the treatment of the former daimyō after the abolition of the han system. Maebara returned to the former Chōshū Domain, now part of the Meiji Yamaguchi Prefecture.

== Revolt ==
On 24 October 1876, Maebara was contacted by the leaders of the Shinpūren Rebellion in Kumamoto to join forces in a widespread uprising against the Meiji government in Kyushu and southwestern Honshu. The Shinpūren Rebellion was defeated the following morning, but managed to inflict surprisingly large casualties on the Imperial Japanese Army and officials of Kumamoto Prefecture. Sympathizers of the rebellion were inspired to instigate their own rebellions against the Meiji government despite the little chance of success.

On 26 October 1876, Maebara gathered a group of like-minded samurai in Hagi, the former capital of Chōshū Domain, and proposed a lightning strike against the Meiji government offices located in Yamaguchi, the capital of Yamaguchi Prefecture. As his forces numbered only around 100 warriors, it was decided to make a night attack, with the date set at 28 October. However, the Governor of Yamaguchi Prefecture was informed of Maebara's preparation and sent word to him with news of the crushed Shinpūren Rebellion, and urged that he stand down. Maebara realized that his plans for a surprise attack were doomed to fail, and that the government offices in Yamaguchi had been reinforced with Imperial troops, so he changed his strategy. Instead, Maebara decided to march along the coast of the Sea of Japan to the national capital Tokyo, winning over the ex-samurai from the various former domains along the way, and to commit mass seppuku (ritual suicide) at the feet of Emperor Meiji. Maebara's rebels marched from Hagi to Susa, looting along the way. They recruited more warriors in Susa and began to call themselves the Juntoku Army. Maebara's plans to travel by sea to Hamada in Iwami Province were defeated by strong winds, and he returned to Hagi rather than proceed further. Maebara discovered upon his return to Hagi that someone had dumped his secret store of ammunition into the ocean, rendering his army largely weaponless.

On 5 November, Maebara attempted to escape from Hagi with a handful of men in an attempt to reach Tokyo, but he was captured and the remainder of the Juntoku Army was crushed by army troops at Hagi. Maebara and six of his associates were tried before a military tribunal in Fukuoka Prefecture, and were executed on December 3 alongside leaders of the Akizuki Rebellion, another Shinpuren-inspired rebellion that began in Akizuki on 27 October. Forty of the surviving rebels received prison sentences.

== See also ==
- Akizuki rebellion
- Shinpūren rebellion
- Saga Rebellion
- Satsuma Rebellion
