= Hayashi Ōen =

Japanese nativist scholar and priest (1797–1870)

- 林 桜園
- Born: 1797; Kumamoto Domain, Japan
- Died: November 5, 1870 (aged 72–73); Kumamoto, Empire of Japan

Hayashi Tōji Arimichi (林 藤次 有通; 1797–1870) was a Japanese nationalist, priest, scholar of kokugaku, and Shinto fundamentalist. He was also a physician and military strategist. He is most often known by the pseudonyms Hayashi Ōen (林 桜園) or, rarely, Hayashi Tsūten (林 通天).

== Biography ==
A samurai by birth, Ōen was born the third child of Hayashi Mataemon Hidemichi (林 又右衛門 英通), a retainer of the Kumamoto Domain. He studied under Nagase Masaki, and was noted for his scholarly studies of the Japanese classics of Higo as well as the writings of earlier scholars of the kokugaku movement. Among these, he was particularly influenced by the spiritual and cosmological writings of Hirata Atsutane.

A deeply religious man, Ōen placed substantial emphasis on the use of the ukehi ritual in divination, calling it, "the most wondrous of all Shinto rites".

In 1853, Ōen became aware of the arrival of the American naval squadron off the coast at Uraga. He immediately armed himself and, shouldering a votive image of Yahata, traveled to the scene, evidently with the intention of directly engaging the Americans. However, by the time he arrived, the diplomatic discussions had ended and the fleet had already departed.

After returning to Kumamoto, Ōen's teaching was changed. He became increasingly single-minded in the carrying out of rites and began instructing his students in methods to defend the country from the Americans, who he believed harbored a desire to eventually conquer or subjugate Japan. He assessed that the long peace of the Edo period had left Japan in a state of military inanition, and that it was likely that a total war against the European and American powers would end in Japan's destruction. However, he advocated that such destruction was preferable to military or cultural surrender on the grounds that it was necessary to remain loyal to Japan's native way of life at all costs, even if the nation's population should expire.

Ōen promulgated his highly xenophobic views through his school, the Gendōkan (原道館), which he established in 1837 within the ruins of Chiba Castle, not far from Kumamoto Castle. He advocated resistance to Western influence and trade, and recommended the expulsion of foreigners from Japan. His students included the swordsman-activist Todoroki Buhē and assassin Kawakami Gensai. In 1868, he became a teacher at the Jishūkan, and also worked as an advisor to Iwakura Tomomi within the new government. He died aged 73 at the home of his student Otaguro Tomoo. After his death, his students, led by Tomoo, adapted his teachings to form the basis of the Shinpūren movement.

A great deal of information about Ōen's life and activities was preserved by the Sakurayama Compatriots' Society (桜山同志会), established in 1886 for the bereaved family members of former Shinpūren warriors. Ishihara Shiko'o, an orphan left behind by the Shinpūren incident, wrote and lectured extensively on Ōen and his followers until his death in 1936. The Sakurayama Compatriots' Society is long since defunct, but the records it maintained are now housed in the Shinpūren Archive in the vicinity of modern-day Sakurayama Shrine, in Kumamoto.
