= Shinpūren rebellion =

1876 Japanese uprising

Shinpūren Rebellion
- Part of the Shizoku rebellions of the Meiji period
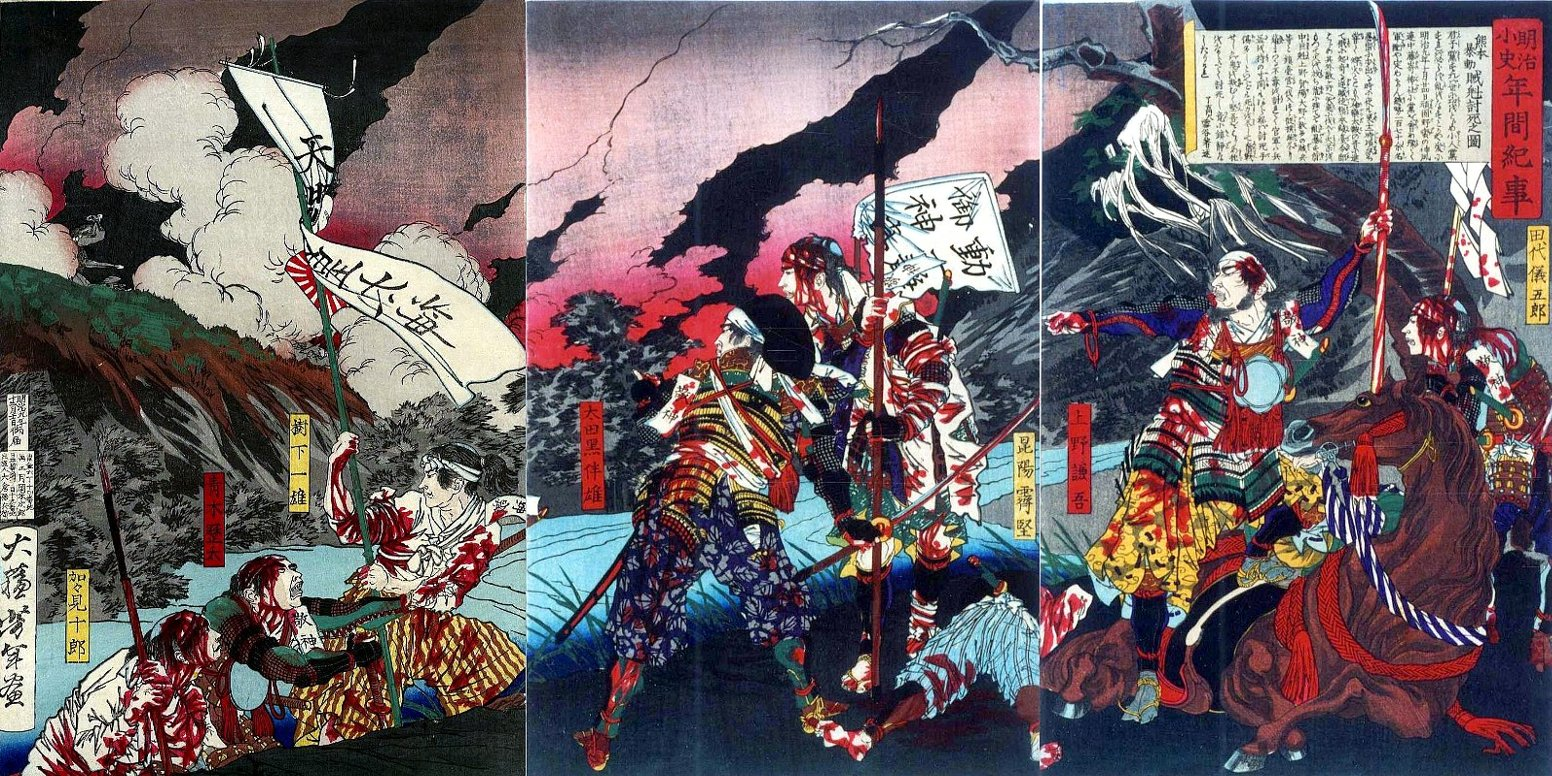
- "The Death in Battle of the Kumamoto Rebels" by Tsukioka Yoshitoshi (Note: From left to right: Kagami Jūrō (加々見十郎), Aoki Rekita (青木暦太), Juge Kazuo (樹下一雄), Ōtaguro Tomoo (太田黒伴雄), Kaya Harukata (昆陽霽堅), Ueno Kengo (上野諌吾), Tashiro Gigorō (田代儀五郎))
Date	24 October 1876 – 25 October 1876
Location	Kumamoto, Kumamoto Prefecture, Japan
Result	Government victory: Akizuki rebellion and Hagi Rebellion

Belligerents
(Empire of Japan) Meiji Government of Japan: (Empire of Japan) Imperial Japanese Army	Keishintō: Samurai of the Kumamoto Domain

Commanders and leaders
Kumamoto Garrison: Yasuoka Ryosuke X Taneda Masaaki X: Yokura Tomozane; Ōshima Kunihide †; Fukuhara Toyonori; Shioya Katakuni; Hayashi Junnosuke; Tanimura Keisuke; Relief Forces: Kodama Gentarō: Oku Yasukata; Ogawa Mataji	Keishintō; Otaguro Tomoo ‡‡: Kaya Harukata †; Ueno Kengo ‡‡; Ogata Kotarō (surrendered); Ishihara Unshirō ‡‡; Kagami Jūrō ‡‡; Onimaru Kisō †

Strength
300 soldiers and policemen	174–200 Kumamoto samurai

Casualties and losses
60 killed 200+ wounded	124+ killed or seppuku 50 wounded

The Shinpūren rebellion (神風連の乱, Shinpūren no ran / Jinpūren no ran) was an uprising against the Meiji government of Japan that occurred in Kumamoto on 24 October 1876.

The Keishintō (敬神党), an extremist Shinto organization of former samurai of the Kumamoto Domain, were extremely opposed to the Westernization of Japan and loss of their class privileges after the Meiji Restoration. The Keishintō under the leadership of Otaguro Tomoo launched a surprise attack against the Imperial Japanese Army and Meiji government in Kumamoto, killing dozens of soldiers and Kumamoto Prefecture officials. The Keishintō were defeated by the army the following morning, with most surviving rebels killing themselves by committing seppuku or being arrested and executed by Meiji authorities.

The Shinpūren rebellion was one of a number of "shizoku uprisings" which took place in Kyūshū and western Honshu during the early Meiji period.

== Background ==
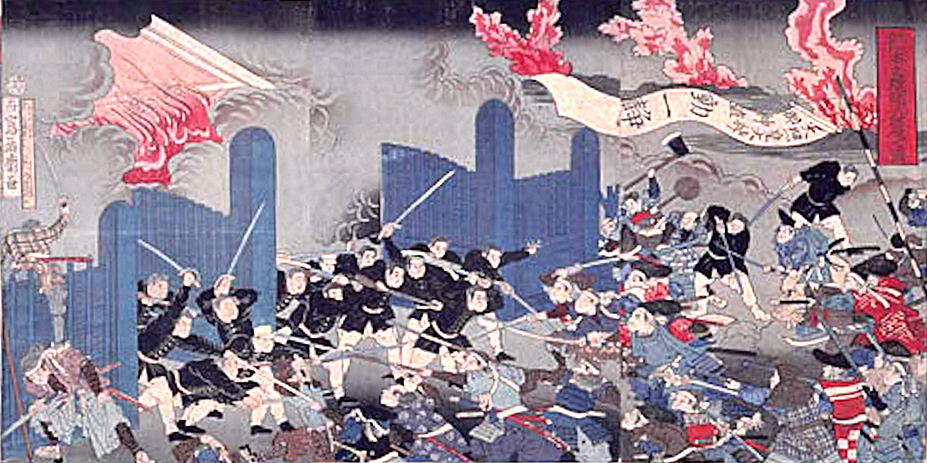
Painting depicting the Imperial Japanese Army's repression of the Shinpūren rebellion.

In 1868, the Meiji Restoration established the Empire of Japan during the Bakumatsu, and overthrew the Tokugawa Shogunate that had ruled Japan as a feudal state since 1600. The new Meiji government enacted policies of modernization and Westernization, including reforms aimed at deconstructing feudalism in Japan such as the abolition of the han system and the Tokugawa class system. Many conservative members of the samurai, the former powerful and privileged warrior class, were disgruntled with the direction the nation had taken. The Meiji reforms saw them lose their privileged social status under the feudal order, also eliminating their income, and the establishment of universal military conscription had replaced much of their role in the society. The very rapid modernization and Westernization of Japan was resulting in massive changes to Japanese culture, dress and society, and appeared to many samurai to be a betrayal of the "joi " ("Expel the Barbarian") portion of the Sonnō jōi justification used to overthrow the former Tokugawa shogunate.

The Keishintō was an extremist and xenophobic secret society of ex-samurai of the Kumamoto Domain in Higo Province led by Otaguro Tomoo, which grew out of the teachings of Hayashi Ōen. The island of Kyūshū was historically the main location of trade with the West, but also a stronghold of conservative anti-Meiji sentiment. Keishintō members did not want to simply halt the Westernization process, they wanted to turn the clock back and eradicate every trace of Westernization, including the wearing of Western clothes, use of the Gregorian calendar, and even the use of Western weapons. Members carried salt with them at all times for use in ritual purification of polluting foreign influences, such as electricity, railroads, individuals dressed in Western-style clothing, and even Buddhist priests. They were outraged by Meiji government decrees permitting foreigners to purchase land in Japan, to allow missionaries to spread the Christian religion, and to forbid the carrying of swords. A rumor that Emperor Meiji was planning a trip overseas was the final straw for Keishintō members.

== Uprising ==
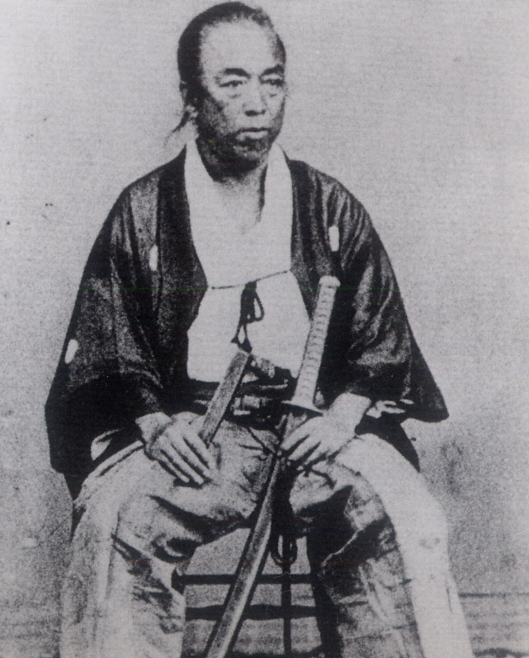
Yasuoka Ryosuke, the Governor of Kumamoto Prefecture, was assassinated during the Shinpūren rebellion.

Otaguro was also a Shinto priest (kannushi), and after several attempts at divination, was given what he considered to be divine authorization to lead an uprising. As the Meiji government had called upon the Imperial Japanese Army garrison at Kumamoto to suppress the nearby Saga Rebellion, the city itself was only lightly defended. On 24 October 1876, after sending messages to like-minded groups in other domains, Otaguro led his 200 men in revolt against the Meiji government, dividing his force into squads. One squad launched a surprise night attack on the barracks of the Imperial Japanese Army's Kumamoto garrison, giving no quarter and showing no mercy even to the wounded or unarmed, spurred on by their hatred of the conscript army, many of whose soldiers were from burakumin backgrounds. Some 300 men of the garrison were either slaughtered or wounded during the attack. A second squad smashed the local telegraph office, although this in effect cut the rebels off from their would-be allies. A third squad attacked the offices and residences of officials of Kumamoto Prefecture, the new Meiji administrative division that had replaced Higo Province.

The Keishintō assassinated Yasuoka Ryosuke, the governor of Kumamoto Prefecture, Major General Taneda Masaaki, the commander of the Kumamoto garrison, and Taneda's Chief of Staff. However, the tide of the rebellion turned against the rebels once the garrison's remaining Army officers overcame their surprise at the attack. Officers managed to organize their troops, and the Army's superior numbers and firepower soon decimated the rebels, armed only with traditional swords. Otaguro, badly wounded in the fighting, asked for one of his followers to cut off his head as part of a death ritual. After his death, many of his followers followed by committing seppuku. The uprising was over by the following morning, but a state of emergency remained in effect in Kumamoto until November 3.

The graves of some 123 members of the Keishintō are located in the grounds of Sakurayama Shrine in Kumamoto. Many of those who fell were in their teens or early twenties.

== Aftermath ==
Approximately 124 of the 200 Keishintō rebels died during the uprising, either killed in action or from suicide, and most of the remainder were wounded. Surviving rebels were arrested by the Japanese authorities and some were subsequently executed by beheading. Approximately 60 Imperial Japanese Army soldiers and Kumamoto Prefecture officials were killed by the rebels and over 200 were wounded.

At the time, the Shinpūren rebellion had a ripple effect in western Japan, spawning the Akizuki rebellion and the Hagi Rebellion only days later. Although the rebellion failed completely, the fact that a small but determined band of men could create such a state of panic, and could defeat such a large force, proved to be an inspiration to anti-Meiji political secret societies until the end of the Empire of Japan in 1945. The Shinpūren rebellion is sometimes considered to be a precursor to the major Satsuma Rebellion which occurred from January to September 1877.

Yukio Mishima's Runaway Horses, the second book of the Sea of Fertility series, covers the Shinpūren Rebellion in detail. For dramatic purposes, Mishima depicts the Keishintō's divination sessions as involving the use of peach branches. In fact, none of the members of the Keishintō recorded the method of divination that they used.

== See also ==
- Ishihara Shiko'o
- Mito Rebellion
- Irrationalism
