= Saga Rebellion =

1874 anti-Meiji uprising in Japan

- Part of the Shizoku rebellions of the Meiji period
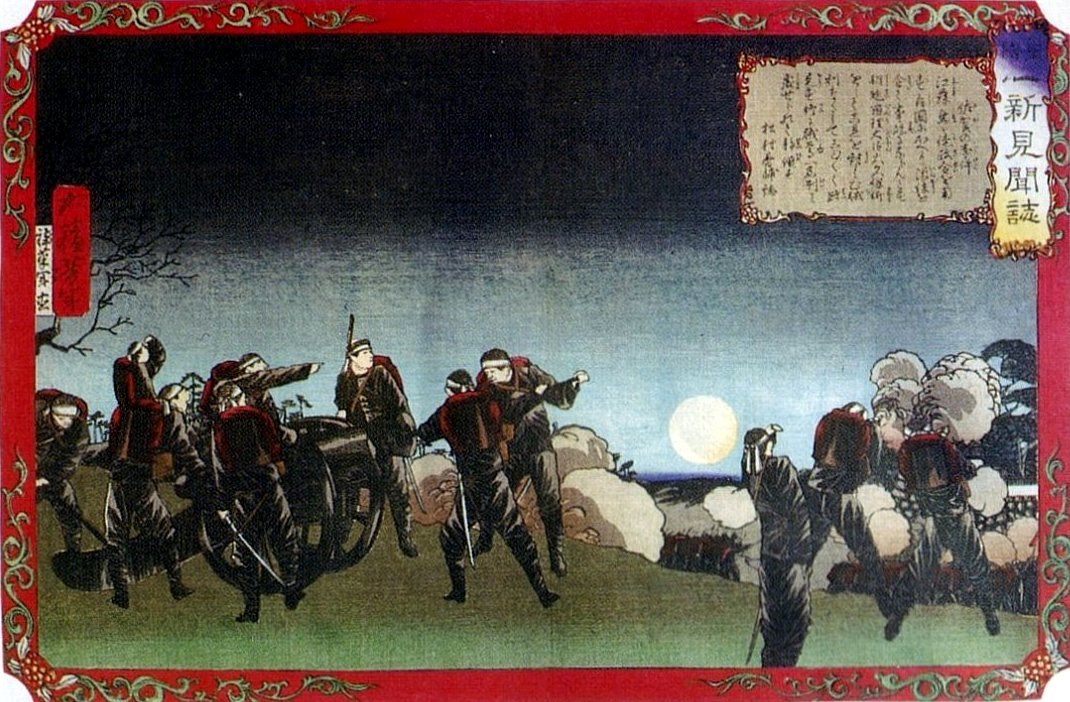
- An ukiyo-e of the Saga Rebellion
Date	16 February – 9 April 1874
Location	Saga Prefecture
Result	Government victory

Belligerents
Meiji Government	Saga rebels

Commanders and leaders
Ōkubo Toshimichi; Prince Komatsu Akihito; Shizuo Nozu; Yamada Akiyoshi	Etō Shinpei †; Shima Yoshitake †

Units involved
Imperial Japanese Army; Imperial Japanese Navy	Unknown

Strength
c. 5,000 soldiers and policemen c. 5,000 shizoku volunteers	11,000 Saga rebels 3,000 members of the Seikantō Party & Ugoku League

Casualties and losses
147 killed 209 wounded	173 killed 160 wounded Other leaders executed

The Saga Rebellion (佐賀の乱, Saga no ran) was an 1874 uprising in Kyūshū against the new Meiji government of Japan. It was led by Etō Shinpei and Shima Yoshitake in their native domain of Hizen.

== Background ==
Following the 1868 Meiji Restoration, many members of the former samurai class were disgruntled with the direction the nation had taken. The abolition of their former privileged social status under the feudal order had also eliminated their income, and the establishment of universal military conscription had eliminated much of their reason for existence. The very rapid modernization (Westernization) of the country was resulting in massive changes to Japanese culture, language, dress and society, and appeared to many samurai to be a betrayal of the jōi (“Expel the Barbarian”) portion of the Sonnō jōi justification used to overthrow the former Tokugawa shogunate.

Hizen Province, with a large samurai population, was a center of unrest against the new government. Older samurai formed political groups rejecting both overseas expansionism and westernization, and calling for a return to the old feudal order. Younger samurai organized the group Seikantō political party, advocating militarism and the invasion of Korea.

== Prelude ==
Etō Shinpei, former Justice Minister and sangi (Councilor) in the early Meiji government resigned his posts in 1873 to protest the government's refusal to launch a military expedition against Korea (Seikanron). Etō then assisted Itagaki Taisuke in organizing the Aikoku Kōtō political party, and in composing the Tosa Memorial, a sharp criticism of the government. In January 1874, frustrated by the government's rejection of his efforts, he returned to his native Saga where both the traditionists and the Seikantō samurai rallied to his support.

Alarmed by growing rumors of unrest, Home Minister Ōkubo Toshimichi dispatched his henchman Iwamura Takatoshi to Saga to restore order. Iwamura only made the situation worse with his overbearing attitude. On the ship to Saga, he made an enemy of Shima Yoshitake, the former governor of Akita Prefecture, who was traveling to Saga at the request of Sanjō Sanetomi. Iwamura so outraged Shima that Shima decided to throw his lot in with Etō and his rebels.

== The Rebellion ==
Etō decided to take action on 16 February 1874, by raiding a bank and occupying government offices within the grounds of the old Saga castle. Etō had expected that similarly disaffected samurai in Satsuma and Tosa would stage insurrections when they received word of his actions, but he had miscalculated badly, and both domains remained calm.

On February 19, Ōkubo set up his headquarters in Hakata and issued a proclamation condemning the Saga rebels as traitors. Government troops marched into Saga the following day. After losing a battle on the border of Saga and Fukuoka on February 22, Etō decided that further resistance would only result in needless deaths, and disbanded his army.

Etō told his followers that he intended to escape to Kagoshima to obtain help from Saigō Takamori and his Satsuma samurai. If Saigō refused, he intended to go to Tosa, and if Tosa likewise refused, he would make his way to Tokyo to commit seppuku.

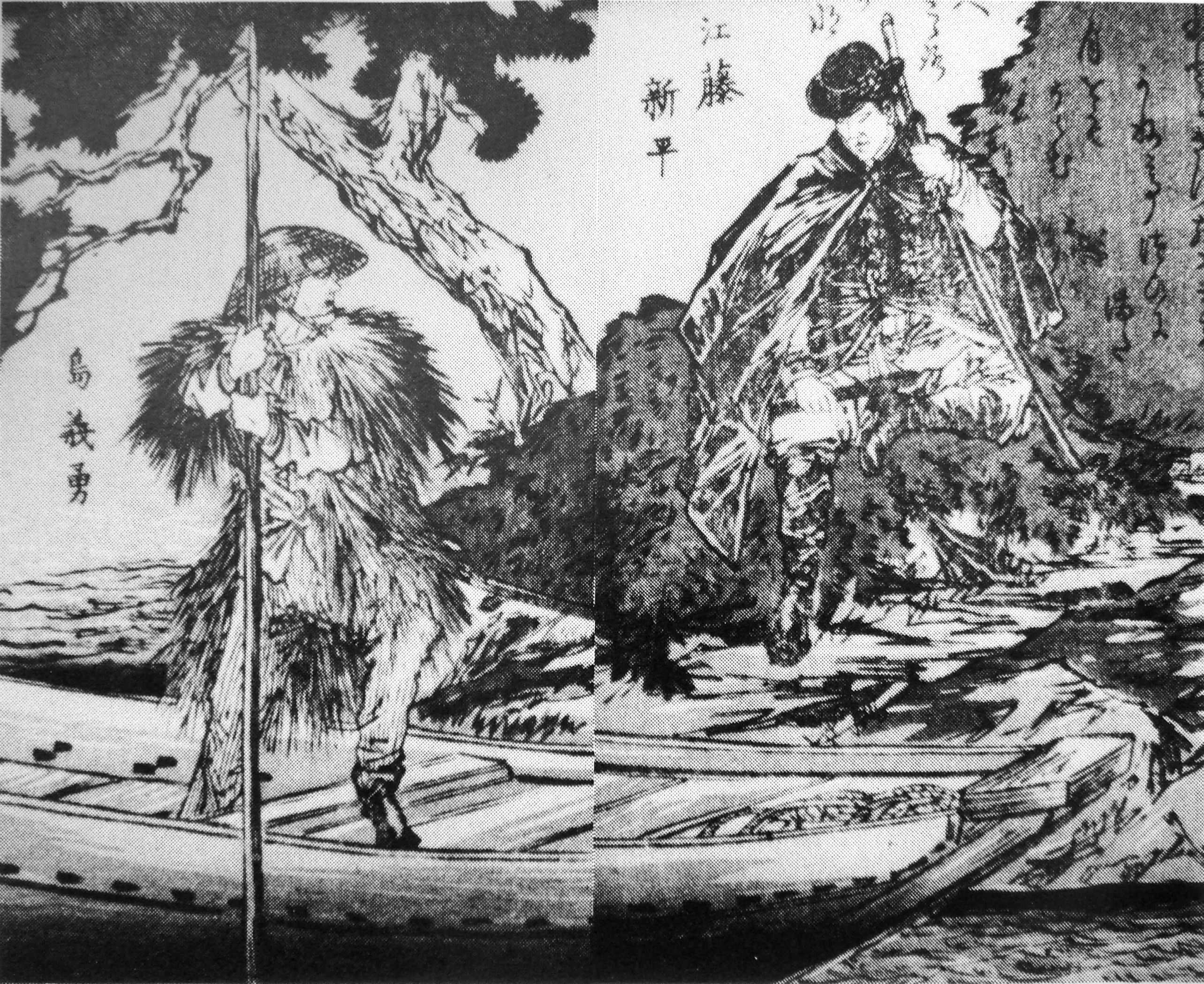
Etō and Shima on the run as fugitives

Although the Saga rebels were greatly demoralized by Etō's flight, they continued to fight on, with some of the most violent combat occurring in the streets of Saga on February 27. Shima, who announced his decision to die fighting at Saga castle, fled that night for Kagoshima with his staff. Government forces seized Saga Castle on March 1 without further bloodshed.

Arrest warrants were circulated for Etō and Shima, and it is ironic that Etō was on the run as a fugitive from the very police force which he had helped create. Etō was refused support in Kagoshima, and fled to Tosa in a fishing boat, where he was received coldly. While attempting to find a boat to take him to Tokyo, he was apprehended on March 28.

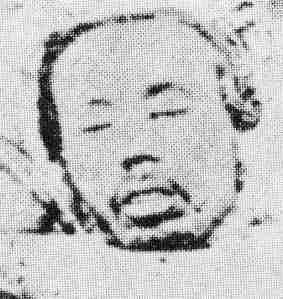
Head of Etō Shinpei on public display after his execution

Sympathy for Etō was high, with Sanjo Sanetomi writing to Ōkubo to remind him that Etō's motives were not evil, and with Kido Takayoshi likewise writing to suggest that Etō be employed in the upcoming Taiwan Expedition of 1874. However, Ōkubo was adamant that an example be set, and Etō and Shima were tried by a military tribunal on April 12, and executed the next day along with eleven other leaders of the revolt. Etō was beheaded at Ōkubo's orders, and his severed head placed on public display – considered a demeaning punishment for someone of samurai class. Photographs were taken and were sold in Tokyo; however, the Tokyo government later banned their sale and ordered people who had purchased the photographs to return them. Ōkubo, however, refused to comply and hung a copy of the photograph in the reception room of the Home Ministry.

== Consequences ==
Although the samurai uprising in Saga had been suppressed by military force, the issues which led to the uprising remained unresolved. Kyūshū continued to be a hotbed of unrest against the central government through the 1870s, culminating with the Satsuma Rebellion.

== See also ==
- Hagi Rebellion
- Akizuki Rebellion
- Shinpūren Rebellion
- Satsuma Rebellion
