= Ōtaguro Tomoo =

Japanese Nationalist and leader of the Shinpūren Rebellion

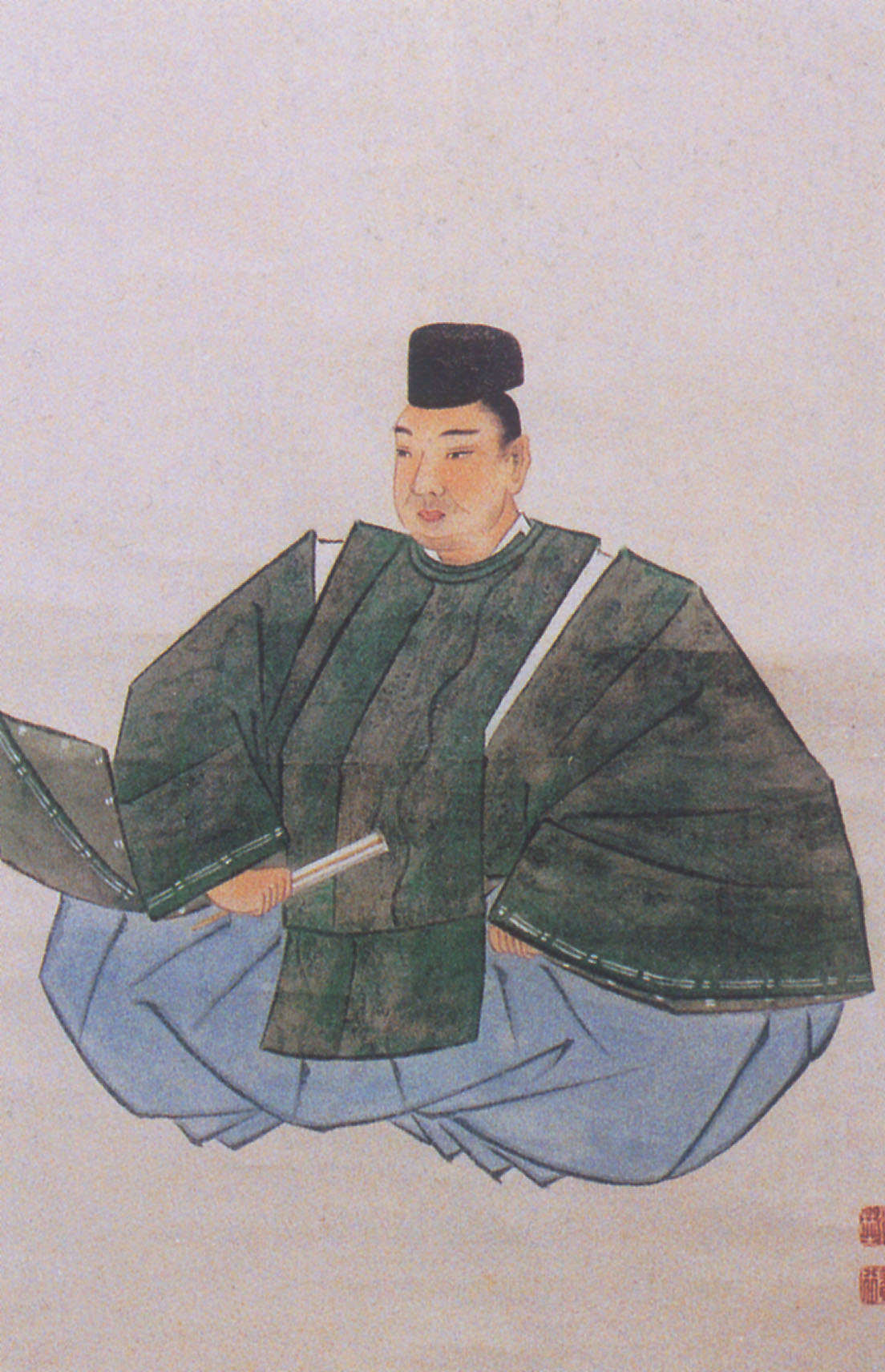
Otaguro Tomoo

Ōtaguro Tomoo (太田黒伴雄; 1836–1876) was a Japanese Nationalist and the leader of the Shinpūren Rebellion.

A sickly child, Ōtaguro was raised by his mother's family after the death of his father. In his early years, his health was so fragile that the family's physician even forbade him from reading.

Disgusted by the ukiyo lifestyle of contemporary Edo, Ōtaguro became involved with the Tosa Kinnō-tō movement of Takechi Hanpeita. Concerned that his sonnō jōi activism would have negative repercussions for his family, he had himself stricken from the records of the Iida clan and was adopted into the Ono family (who later disowned him on charges of negligence). He became a disciple of Hayashi Ōen's school of classical Japanese literature and theology, and followed his mentor into the Shinto priesthood, becoming shikan of the Isa Ote Jingu shrine at Shinkai.

== Shinpūren ==
After the death of Ōen, Ōtaguro, together with some of his contemporaries, founded the Shinpūren movement, a xenophobic nationalist organisation. In October 1876, members of the group, led by Ōtaguro, staged a revolt against the local government in Kumamoto Prefecture. Their initial success was quickly quashed by the Imperial Japanese Army garrison stationed in Kumamoto, and by the following morning around 120 of the 200 rebels were dead, including Ōtaguro himself.
