= Silk and Insight =

1964 novel by Yukio Mishima

- First edition (publ. Kodansha)
- Author: Yukio Mishima
- Original title: 絹と明察 (Kinu to meisatsu)
- Translator: Hiroaki Sato
- Language: Japanese
- Published: January–October 1964 in Gunzo
- Publisher: Kodansha
- Publication date: 15 October 1964
- Publication place: Japan
- English publication date: 1998
- Media type: Print (hardcover)
- Pages: 299
- OCLC: 672529106
- Dewey Decimal: 895.6/35
- LC Class: PL833.I7 K55213 1998

Silk and Insight (Japanese: 絹と明察, Hepburn: Kinu to meisatsu) is a 1964 novel by the Japanese writer Yukio Mishima. The subject of the novel is taken from an actual strike in Japan in 1954 at Omi Kenshi, a silk thread and fabric manufacturer, which lasted for 106 days. The novel was first serialised in the monthly magazine Gunzo between January–October 1964. It was published in hardcover format by Kodansha on 15 October 1964. It was translated into English in 1998 by Hiroaki Sato.

Although a commercial failure, the novel was awarded the Mainichi Prize from Mainichi Shimbun.

== Plot ==
Komazawa Zenjiro runs his silk factory like a family and feels like a "father" to his workers. Through various intrigues initiated by the trade unionist Okano, the company's workers are instigated into a strike, which escalates to such an extent that Komazawa dies of a stroke. Okano takes over his position, but comes to understand the philosophy of his predecessor.

== Publication ==
Silk and Insight was first serialised ten times in the monthly magazine Gunzo between January 1964 and October 1964. It was published in hardcover format by Kodansha on 15 October 1964. It was published in paperback by Kodansha Bunko on 1 July 1971.

The novel was a commercial failure, with only 18,000 copies published. In comparison, Mishima's novel Kyōko no Ie (1959) sold 150,000 copies in its first month.

=== Translation ===
Mishima originally intended for the novel to be translated into English by John Nathan, who Mishima first met in 1963. In 1965, Nathan translated Mishima's The Sailor Who Fell from Grace with the Sea. Impressed by Nathan's translation, Mishima requested Nathan sign on as his translator and help Mishima in his quest in being awarded the Nobel Prize for Literature. Nathan was more interested in translating the work of Kenzaburō Ōe. Nathan initially agreed to translate Silk and Insight, but was unimpressed with it upon his first reading. He ultimately refused to translate the novel, opting instead to translate Kenzaburō Ōe's A Personal Matter. Mishima, who was considered an "arch-rival" of Ōe, abruptly severed ties with Nathan afterwards.

Silk and Insight was later translated into English in 1998 by Hiroaki Sato and edited by Frank Gibney as the seventh volume in The Library of Japan series, produced by the Pacific Basin Institute at Pomona College.

== Reception ==
The novel was awarded the Mainichi Prize from Mainichi Shimbun.
