= My Friend Hitler =

1968 play by Yukio Mishima

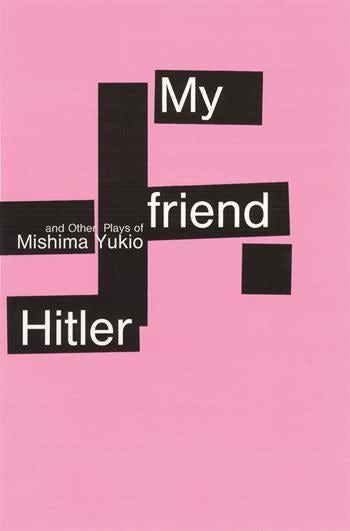
- Written by: Yukio Mishima
- Original language: Japanese
- Genre: neoclassical drama

Premiere
- Date premiered: 1969

My Friend Hitler (わが友ヒットラー, Waga Tomo Hittorā) is a 1968 neoclassical drama written and produced by Japanese writer Yukio Mishima. The play depicts the historical figures Adolf Hitler, Gustav Krupp, Gregor Strasser, and Ernst Röhm, and uses them as mouthpieces to express Mishima's own views on fascism and beauty. Published in book form on October 13, 1968, the play was first produced on stage the following year and ran January 18–31, 1969. In one of these productions, Mishima himself played Adolf Hitler.

== Meaning and symbolism ==
Mishima was inspired by the assassination of Ernst Röhm in the Night of the Long Knives, and was intrigued by Hitler. Since Mishima's earlier play Madame de Sade (Sado Koshaku fujin) featured an all-female cast, he wanted My Friend Hitler to have an all-male cast, stating that he wanted to refute criticism claiming that he could not portray both genders.

The play takes place over the summer of 1934 at the Berlin chancellery. The reviews and critiques of the play vary, with some calling it anti-fascist while others claim that it preaches fascism.

A major theme is "madness disguised as sanity," in other words, the notion that "even among the most calm and sane human beings, there is more ruthlessness than the madmen", whereby Mishima aimed to convey that history was the most inhuman product of humanity: "You want to turn Hitler into an 'other' who has nothing to do with you and settle down in humanism, but Hitler lives in you. You, too, may be 'Hitler's friend' yourself."

In his Memorandum on Marquis de Sade and My Friend Hitler, Mishima made clear his personal opinion on Hitler:

To be honest, I feel a terrifying interest in Hitler, but if the question is whether I like or dislike him, I can only answer, I don’t like him. Hitler was a political genius but was not a hero. He thoroughly lacked the refreshing, sunny quality indispensable to becoming a hero. Hitler is as gloomy as the twentieth century.

== Plot ==
The play begins with Hitler giving a speech to the people of Germany, during which his two friends Krupp and Röhm come in to watch the speech. They talk to each other and discuss the "iron bouquet" Krupp metaphorically used to set into motion great advancements in human history, including shaping Hitler into a better leader.

Later in the play, Strasser enters the scene. He has a bad relationship with Röhm. Krupp describes their relationship as that of a "cat and dog". Strasser then argues that the war profits need to be returned to the country. Röhm gets mad, calling him a socialist. After the speech is finished, Hitler returns to the group awaiting him and gets their reports about the peoples' reaction to the speech, all of them telling him it was outstanding, even calling Hitler an artist.

Hitler then talks to Röhm alone about how they were so close to each other, but now that he is so busy running the country and doesn't have the time anymore to talk about the "good old days" with one of his trusted friends. Hitler then decides to get away from his political life for the day. And so Röhm decides to train Hitler on everything he needs to know about being a military leader.
