= Life for Sale =

1968 novel by Yukio Mishima

- First edition cover (Shueisha, 1968)
- Author: Yukio Mishima
- Original title: 命売ります (Inochi Urimasu)
- Translator: Stephen Dodd
- Language: Japanese
- Genre: Dark comedy Satire
- Set in: Tokyo
- Published: 21 May 1968–8 October 1968 in Weekly Playboy
- Publisher: Shueisha
- Publication date: 25 December 1968
- Publication place: Japan
- English publication date: 1 August 2019
- Media type: Print (hardcover)
- Pages: 229
- OCLC: 54660296
- Dewey Decimal: 895.63/5
- LC Class: PL833.I7 I5

Life for Sale (Japanese: 命売ります, Hepburn: Inochi Urimasu) is a 1968 novel by Yukio Mishima. It was first serialised in twenty-one parts in the weekly magazine Weekly Playboy between 21 May 1968 and 8 October 1968. It was published in hardcover format by Shueisha on 25 December 1968. It was published in paperback by Chikuma Bunko on 24 February 1998. It was translated into English by Stephen Dodd and published in paperback in the United Kingdom by Penguin Classics on 1 August 2019. The English translation received a wider release in paperback by Vintage International on 21 April 2020.

In 2018, the novel was adapted as a BS TV Tokyo television drama starring Aoi Nakamura as Hanio Yamada.

== Plot ==
Hanio Yamada is a 27-year-old copywriter who works for the advertising agency Tokyo Ad. A handsome and successful young man, Yamada is nevertheless unfulfilled by his job and attempts to overdose on a sedative. Awaking in the hospital after his suicide attempt, Yamada becomes consumed by the meaninglessness of existence. He quits his job and advertises his own life for sale in a Tokyo newspaper. Open to any task that might result in his death, Yamada's life is shaken up when he agrees to the increasingly bizarre requests of those who respond to his offer.

== Publication ==
Life for Sale was first serialised in Weekly Playboy twenty-one times between 21 May and 8 October in 1968. It was domestically published in hardcover format by Shueisha on 25 December 1968 and in paperback by Chikuma Bunko thirty years later on 24 February 1998. The novel was translated into English by Stephen Dodd, the Professor of Japanese Literature at the School of Oriental and African Studies, and published in paperback format in the United Kingdom by Penguin Classics on 1 August 2019. Dodd's translation received a wider release in paperback by Vintage International on 21 April 2020.

In Japan, Life for Sale was considered relatively unknown. However, in 2015, the book experienced a sudden surge in popularity, with Chikuma Bunko reprinting 70,000 copies in one month, making it a bestseller that year and the following year in 2016.

== Reception ==
=== Translation ===
Publishers Weekly gave the novel a positive review, writing, "Mishima's pungent insights into the challenges of postwar Japanese life are threaded brilliantly throughout", although "The novel handles its female characters poorly, using them in a disposable way that feels dated."

David Barnett, writing for The Independent, called the novel "funny and horrific and curious and thoroughly entertaining and should win Mishima a new generation of fans".

James Smart wrote in The Guardian: "It may be only a footnote in his career, but this surreal tale offers a trenchant critique of a city that has misplaced its soul."

Writing for the Evening Standard, Ian Thomson gave the novel a rave review, calling it "a sexy, camp delight. Beneath the hard- boiled dialogue and the gangster high jinks is a familiar indictment of consumerist Japan and a romantic yearning for the past."

In the New Statesman, philosopher John Gray wrote that "Life for Sale is not a great work of fiction, but it succeeds in capturing vividly the bathos of the self-pitying modern nihilist."

Andrew Taylor, writing for The Spectator, praised the novel: "This existential crime novel has an arresting premise and Mishima plays it for all it's worth."

== Television adaptation ==
The novel was adapted as a 10-episode BS TV Tokyo television drama in 2018, starring Aoi Nakamura as Hanio Yamada.

== Censorship ==
In August 2025, Belarus's Ministry of Information added the novel to its list of books that "may harm national interests" and whose distribution is consequently prohibited in the country.
