= Yukio Mishima =

Japanese author and coup attempt leader (1925–1970)

- 三島 由紀夫
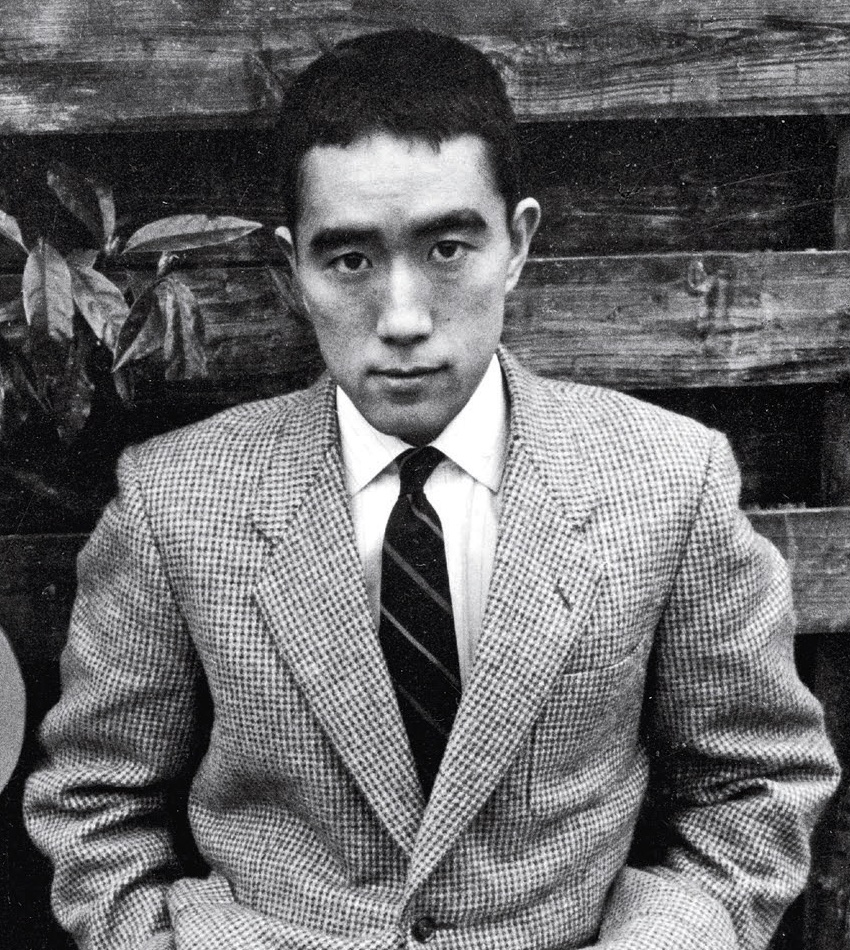
- Mishima in 1955
- Born: Kimitake Hiraoka; 14 January 1925; Tokyo, Japan
- Died: 25 November 1970 (aged 45); Ichigaya, Tokyo, Japan
- Cause of death: Suicide by seppuku
- Resting place: Tama Cemetery, Tokyo
- Education: University of Tokyo (LLB)
- Occupations: Writer; actor; model; martial artist; theatre and film director; civil servant; political activist
- Employers: Ministry of Finance; Bungakuza
- Organization: Tatenokai
- Writing career
- Pen name: Yukio Mishima
- Language: Japanese
- Years active: 1938–1970
- Period: Contemporary (20th century)
- Genres: novel; novella; short story; drama (shingeki; noh; kabuki); libretto; screenplay; poetry; travelogue; autobiography; literary criticism; essay; lecture; manifesto
- Notable works: Confessions of a Mask; The Temple of the Golden Pavilion; The Sea of Fertility
- Movement: Postmodernism
- Martial arts career
- Rank: 5th Dan–Kendo; 1st Dan–Iaido; 1st Dan–Karate

Japanese name
- Kanji: 三島 由紀夫
- Hiragana: みしま ゆきお
Transcriptions
- Romanization: Mishima Yukio

Japanese name
- Kanji: 平岡 公威
- Hiragana: ひらおか きみたけ
Transcriptions
- Romanization: Hiraoka Kimitake

Signature
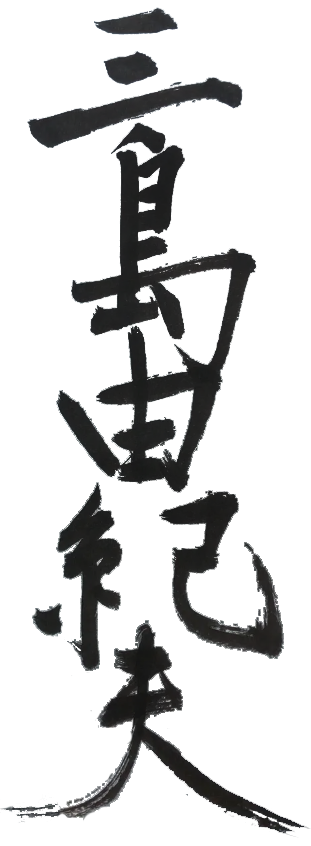

Kimitake Hiraoka (平岡 公威, Hiraoka Kimitake; 14 January 1925 – 25 November 1970), known by his pen name Yukio Mishima (Note: Pronunciations: UK: /ˈmɪʃɪmə/, US: /-mɑː, ˈmiːʃimɑː, mɪˈʃiːmə/, Japanese: [miɕima].) (三島 由紀夫, Mishima Yukio), was a Japanese novelist, playwright, critic, and political activist. He is considered one of the most important postwar stylists of the Japanese language.

Mishima was nominated for the Nobel Prize in Literature five times in the 1960s—including in 1968 when the award went to his countryman and benefactor Yasunari Kawabata. Mishima's works include the novels Confessions of a Mask and The Temple of the Golden Pavilion, and the autobiographical essay Sun and Steel. Mishima's work is characterized by "its luxurious vocabulary and decadent metaphors, its fusion of traditional Japanese and modern Western literary styles, and its obsessive assertions of the unity of beauty, eroticism, and death," according to the author Andrew Rankin.

Mishima's political activities made him a controversial figure; he remains so in Japan to the present day. From his mid-30s onwards, Mishima's far-right ideology and reactionary beliefs became increasingly evident. He extolled the traditional culture and spirit of Japan, and opposed what he saw as Western-style materialism, along with Japan's postwar democracy, globalism, and communism, worrying that by embracing these ideas the Japanese people would lose their "national essence" (kokutai) and distinctive cultural heritage to become a "rootless" people.

In 1968, Mishima formed the Tatenokai ("Shield Society"), a private militia, for the purpose of protecting the dignity of the emperor as a symbol of national identity. The Tatenokai are interpreted by scholars as attempting to reclaim Japan's prewar values of loyalty. Yukio Mishima believed the traditions that made Japan great had been weakened by postwar Japan. Although the Tatenokai were legally allowed in postwar Japan, their ideology directly opposed the newfound pacifism that was adopted. On 25 November 1970, Mishima and four members of his militia entered a military base in central Tokyo, took its commandant hostage, and unsuccessfully tried to inspire the Japan Self-Defense Forces to rise up and overthrow Article 9 of the 1947 Constitution to restore autonomous national defense and the divinity of the emperor. The incident ended with Mishima's suicide by seppuku, which had been planned.

== Life and work ==
=== Early life ===
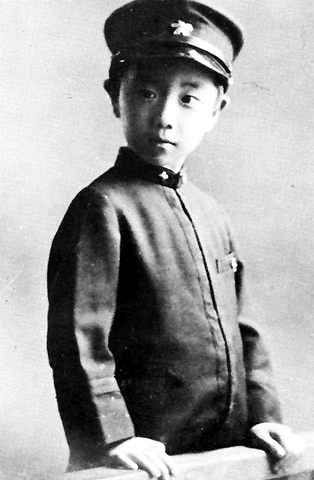
Mishima in his childhood (April 1931, at the age of 6)

On 14 January 1925, Yukio Mishima (三島由紀夫, Mishima Yukio) was born Kimitake Hiraoka (平岡公威, Hiraoka Kimitake) in Nagazumi-cho, Yotsuya-ku of Tokyo City (now part of Yotsuya, Shinjuku-ku, Tokyo). His father was Azusa Hiraoka (平岡梓), a government official in the Ministry of Agriculture and Commerce. His mother, Shizue (平岡倭文重), was the daughter of the 5th principal of the Kaisei Academy. Shizue's father, Kenzō Hashi (橋健三), was a scholar of the Chinese classics, and the Hashi family had served the Maeda clan for generations in Kaga Domain. Mishima's paternal grandparents were Sadatarō Hiraoka, the third Governor-General of Karafuto Prefecture, and Natsuko (family register name: Natsu) (平岡なつ). Mishima received his birth name Kimitake (公威, also read Kōi in on-yomi) in honor of Furuichi Kōi who was a benefactor of Sadatarō. He had a younger sister, Mitsuko (平岡美津子), who died of typhoid fever in 1945 at age 17, and a younger brother, Chiyuki (平岡千之).

Mishima's childhood home was a rented house, though a fairly large two-floor house that was the largest in the neighborhood. He lived with his parents, siblings and paternal grandparents, as well as six maids, a houseboy, and a manservant.

Mishima's early childhood was dominated by the presence of his grandmother, Natsuko, who took the boy and separated him from his immediate family for several years. She was the granddaughter of Matsudaira Yoritaka, the daimyō of Shishido, which was a branch domain of Mito Domain in Hitachi Province; (Note: Yoritaka's eldest son was Matsudaira Yorinori who died at the age of 33 when he was ordered to commit seppuku by the shogunate during the Tengutō Rebellion, because he was sympathetic to Tengu-tō (天狗党)'s Sonnō jōi.) this relationship made Mishima a descendant of Tokugawa Ieyasu, the founder of the Tokugawa Shogunate, through his grandmother. Natsuko's father, Nagai Iwanojō (永井岩之丞), had been a Supreme Court justice, and Iwanojō's adoptive father, Nagai Naoyuki, had been a bannerman of the Tokugawa House during the Bakumatsu. Natsuko had been raised in the household of Prince Arisugawa Taruhito, and she maintained considerable aristocratic pretensions even after marrying Sadatarō, a bureaucrat who had made his fortune in the newly opened colonial frontier in the north, and who eventually became Governor-General of Karafuto Prefecture on Sakhalin Island. Sadatarō's father, Takichi Hiraoka (平岡太吉), and grandfather, Tazaemon Hiraoka (平岡太左衛門), had been farmers. (Note: Mishima had told about his bloodline that; "I'm a descendant of the peasants and samurais, and my way of working is like a most hard-working peasant.") Natsuko was prone to violent outbursts, occasionally alluded to in Mishima's works, to which some biographers have traced Mishima's fascination with death. She did not allow Mishima to venture into the sunlight, engage in any kind of sport, or play with other boys. He spent much of his time either alone or with female cousins and their dolls.

Mishima's father, Azusa, had a taste for military discipline, and worried Natsuko's style of childrearing was too soft. When Mishima was returned to his immediate family at age 12, Azusa employed extreme parenting tactics, such as holding young Mishima up close to the side of a speeding steam locomotive. He also raided his son's room for evidence of an "effeminate" interest in literature, and often ripped his son's manuscripts apart. Although Azusa forbade him from writing any additional stories, Mishima continued to write in secret, supported and protected by his mother, who was always the first to read a new story.

When Mishima was 13, Natsuko took him to see his first Kabuki play: The Treasury of Loyal Retainers, an allegory of the story of the 47 Rōnin. He was taken to his first Noh play (Miwa, a story featuring Amano-Iwato) by his maternal grandmother Tomi Hashi (橋トミ). From these early experiences, Mishima enjoyed Kabuki and Noh. He began attending performances every month and grew deeply interested in these traditional Japanese dramatic art forms.

=== Schooling and early works ===
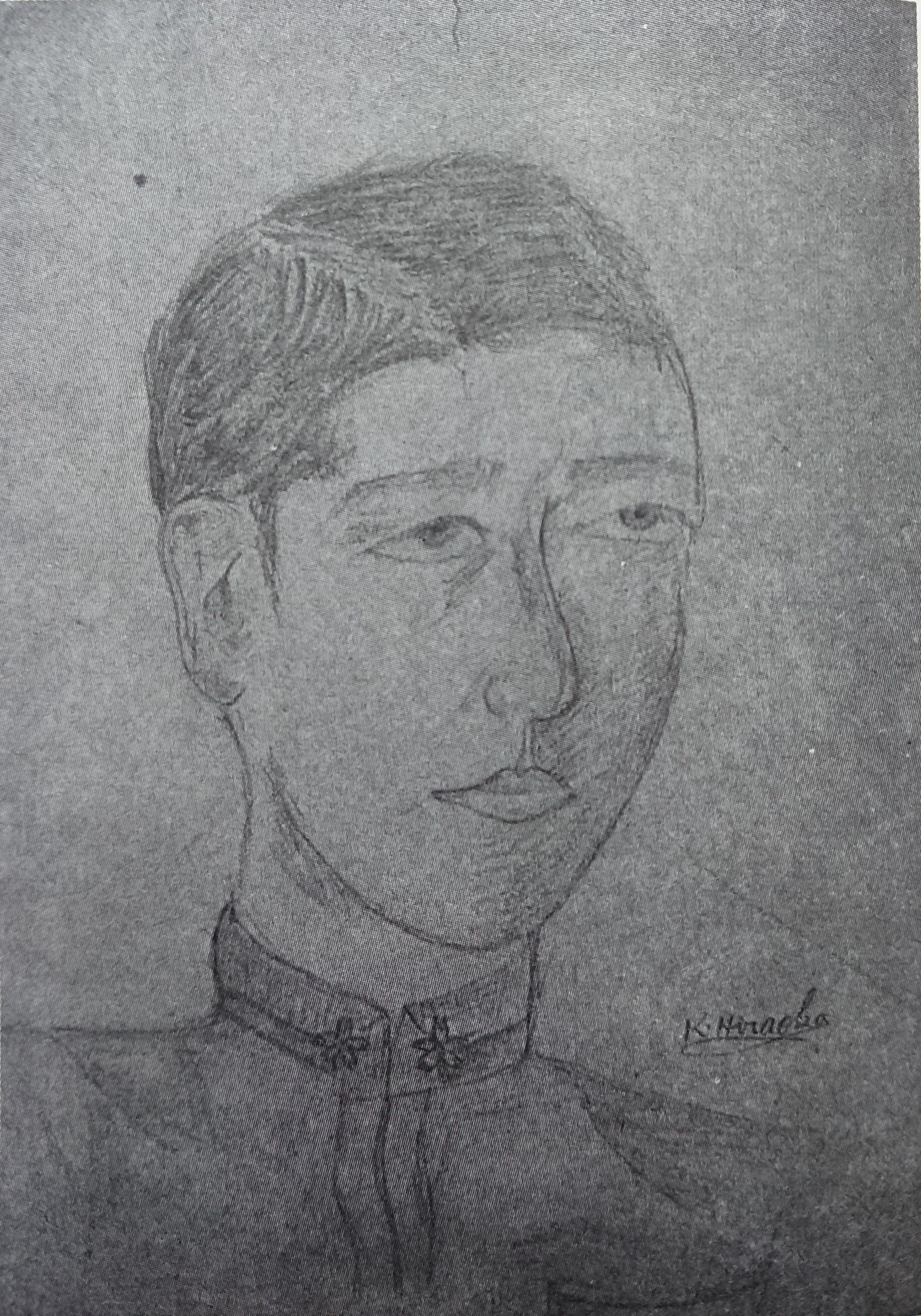
Mishima's self-portrait drawn in junior high school

Mishima was enrolled at the age of six in the elite Gakushūin, the Peers' School in Tokyo, which had been established in the Meiji period to educate the Imperial family and the descendants of the old feudal nobility. Mishima began to write his first stories aged 12, taking inspiration from myths (Kojiki, Greek mythology, etc.) and the works of numerous classic Japanese authors, as well as Raymond Radiguet, Jean Cocteau, Oscar Wilde, Rainer Maria Rilke, Thomas Mann, Friedrich Nietzsche, Charles Baudelaire, l'Isle-Adam, and other European authors. He also studied German. After six years as a pupil, he became the youngest member of the editorial board of its literary society. Mishima was particularly drawn to the works of Japanese poet Shizuo Itō (伊東静雄), Haruo Satō, and Michizō Tachihara, who inspired Mishima's appreciation of classical Japanese waka poetry. Mishima's early contributions to the Gakushūin literary magazine Hojinkai-zasshi (輔仁会雑誌) (Note: 輔仁 (Hojin) is an East Asian name composed of two characters which individually mean "assistance" and "benevolence".) included haiku and waka poetry before he turned his attention to prose.

In 1941, at the age of 16, Mishima was invited to write a short story for the Hojinkai-zasshi, where he submitted Forest in Full Bloom (花ざかりの森, Hanazakari no Mori), a story in which the narrator describes the feeling that his ancestors somehow still live on within him. The story displays several metaphors and aphorisms that would become Mishima's hallmarks. (Note: At the end of this debut work, a limpid "tranquility" is drawn, and it is often pointed out by some literature researchers that it has something in common with the ending of Mishima's posthumous work The Sea of Fertility.) He also sent a copy of the manuscript to his teacher Fumio Shimizu, who was so impressed that he and his fellow editorial board members decided to publish it in their literary magazine Bungei Bunka.

In order to protect him from potential backlash from Azusa, Shimizu and the other editorial board members coined the pen-name Yukio Mishima. They took "Mishima" from Mishima Station, which Shimizu and his fellow Bungei Bunka board member Hasuda Zenmei passed through on their way to the editorial meeting which was held in Shuzenji, Shizuoka. The name "Yukio" came from yuki (雪), the Japanese word for "snow" because of the snow they saw on Mount Fuji as the train passed. The story was later published as a limited book edition (4,000 copies) in 1944 due to a wartime paper shortage. Mishima had it published as a keepsake to remember him by, as he assumed that he would die in the war.

In the editorial notes of Bungei Bunka magazine in 1941, when this debut work was serialized, Hasuda praised Mishima's genius: "This youthful author is a heaven-sent child of eternal Japanese history. He is much younger than we are, but has arrived on the scene already quite mature." Hasuda, who became something of a mentor to Mishima, was an ardent nationalist and a fan of Motoori Norinaga (1730–1801), a scholar of kokugaku from the Edo period who preached Japanese traditional values and devotion to the emperor. Hasuda had previously fought for the Imperial Japanese Army in China in 1938, and in 1943 he was recalled to active service for deployment as a first lieutenant in the Southeast Asian theater. At a farewell party thrown for Hasuda by the Bungei Bunka group, Hasuda offered the following parting words to Mishima: "I have entrusted the future of Japan to you." According to Mishima, these words were deeply meaningful to him, and had a profound effect on the future course of his life.

Later in 1941, Mishima wrote an essay about his deep devotion to Shintō, titled The Way of the Gods (惟神之道, Kannagara no michi). Mishima's story The Cigarette (煙草, Tabako), published in 1946, describes a homosexual love he felt at school and being teased from members of the school's rugby union because he belonged to the literary society. Another story from 1954, The Boy Who Wrote Poetry (詩を書く少年, Shi o kaku shōnen), was similarly based on Mishima's memories of his time at Gakushūin Junior High School.

On 9 September 1944, Mishima graduated Gakushūin High School at the top of the class, becoming a graduate representative. Emperor Hirohito was present at the graduation ceremony, with Mishima later receiving a silver watch from him at the Imperial Household Ministry.

On 27 April 1944, during the final years of World War II, Mishima received a conscription notice for the Imperial Japanese Army, barely passing his conscription examination on 16 May 1944 with a less desirable rating of "second class" conscript. Scholars have argued that Mishima's failure to receive a "first class" rating on his conscription examination (reserved only for the most physically fit recruits), in combination with the illness which led him to be erroneously declared unfit for duty, contributed to an inferiority complex over his frail constitution that later led to his obsession with physical fitness and bodybuilding.

Mishima had a cold during his medical check on convocation day (10 February 1945), which the army doctor misdiagnosed as tuberculosis; Mishima was declared unfit for service and sent home. Mishima would later hint in his quasi-autobiographical novel Confessions of a Mask (1949) that he might have lied to the doctor in order to secure the misdiagnosis. Mishima wrote:

Why had I looked so frank as I lied to the army doctor? Why had I said that I'd been having a slight fever for over half a year, that my shoulder was painfully stiff, that I spit blood, that even last night I had been soaked by a night sweat?...Why when sentenced to return home the same day had I felt the pressure of a smile come pushing so persistently at my lips that I had difficulty in concealing it? Why had I run so when I was through the barracks gate? Hadn't my hopes been blasted? What was the matter that I hadn't hung my head and trudged away with heavy feet? I realized vividly that my future life would never attain heights of glory sufficient to justify my having escaped death in the army...

The veracity of this account is impossible to know for certain, but what is unquestionable is that Mishima did not speak out against the doctor's diagnosis of tuberculosis. Researchers have speculated that Mishima's guilt at allowing himself to escape death in the war left a lasting impression on his life and writing, possibly contributing to his later suicide.

The day before his failed medical examination, Mishima had written a farewell message to his family, ending with the words "Long live the Emperor!" (天皇陛下万歳, Tennō heika banzai), including hair and nail clippings as mementos for his parents. The unit that Mishima would have enlisted in was eventually sent to the Philippines, with few survivors. Mishima's parents were ecstatic that he did not have to go to war, but Mishima's mood was harder to read, and his mother overheard him express a wish that he could have joined a "Special Attack" unit. He also expressed an admiration for kamikaze pilots and other "special attack" units. In a 21 April 1945 letter to a friend, Mishima wrote:

It was through the kamikazes that "modern man" has finally been able to grasp the dawning of the "present day", or perhaps better said, "our historical era" in a true sense, and for the first time the intellectual class, which until now had been the illegitimate child of modernity, became the legitimate heir of history. I believe that all of this is thanks to the kamikazes. This is the reason why the entire cultural class of Japan, and all people of culture around the world, should kneel before the kamikazes and offer up prayers of gratitude.

Mishima was deeply affected by Emperor Hirohito's radio broadcast announcing Japan's surrender on 15 August 1945, vowing to protect Japanese cultural traditions and to help to rebuild Japanese culture after the destruction of the war. He wrote in his diary, "Only by preserving Japanese irrationality will we be able contribute to world culture 100 years from now."

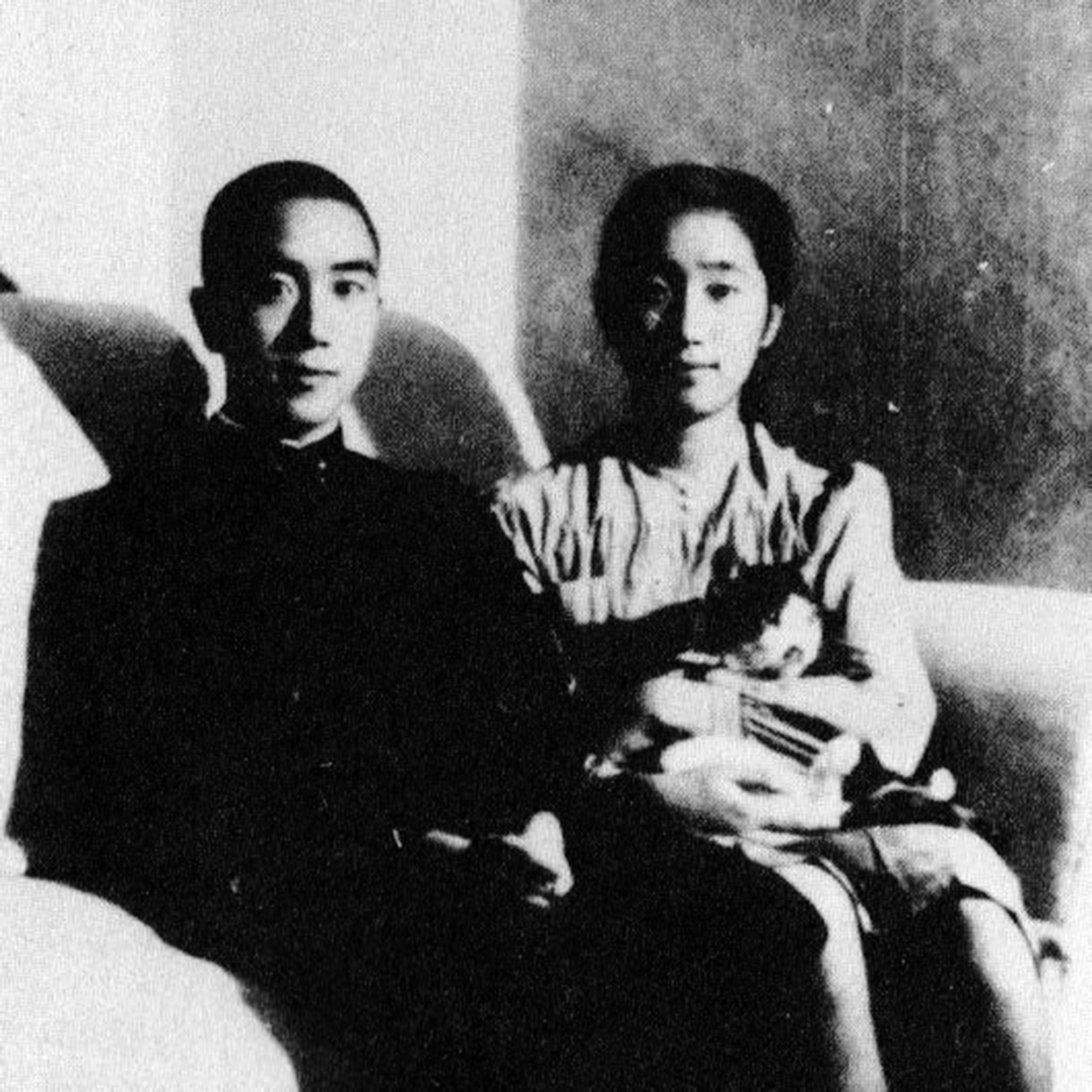
Mishima at age 19, with his sister Mitsuko at age 16 (on 9 September 1944)

Four days after Japan's surrender, Mishima's mentor Zenmei Hasuda, who had been drafted and deployed to the Malay peninsula, shot and killed his superior officer, who blamed Japan's defeat on the Emperor. Hasuda had long suspected the officer to be a Korean spy. After shooting him, Hasuda turned his pistol on himself. Mishima learned of the incident a year later and contributed poetry in Hasuda's honor at a memorial service in November 1946. On 23 October 1945 (Showa 20), Mishima's beloved younger sister Mitsuko died suddenly at age 17 from typhoid fever after drinking untreated water. Around the same time, he also learned that Kuniko Mitani (三谷邦子), a classmate's sister whom he had hoped to marry, was engaged to another man. (Note: Kuniko Mitani, the sister of Makoto Mitani (三谷信), would become the model for "Sonoko" in Confessions of a Mask. Mishima wrote about his loss in a letter to his acquaintance, lamenting that "I wouldn't have lived if I didn't write about her.") Mishima used these events as inspiration and motivation for his later literary work.

At the end of the war, his father Azusa "half-allowed" Mishima to become a novelist. He was worried that his son would become a professional novelist, preferring instead that his son follow in the footsteps of himself and Mishima's grandfather Sadatarō and become a bureaucrat. To this end, he advised his son to enroll in the Faculty of Law instead of the literature department. Attending lectures during the day and writing at night, Mishima graduated from the University of Tokyo in 1947. He obtained a position in the Ministry of Finance and was set for a promising career as a government bureaucrat. However, after just one year of employment, Mishima had exhausted himself so much that his father agreed to allow him to resign from his post and devote himself to writing full time.

In 1945, Mishima began the short story "A Story at the Cape" (岬にての物語, Misaki nite no Monogatari) and continued to work on it throughout World War II. After the war, the story was praised by poet Shizuo Itō (伊東静雄), whom Mishima respected.

=== Post-war literature ===
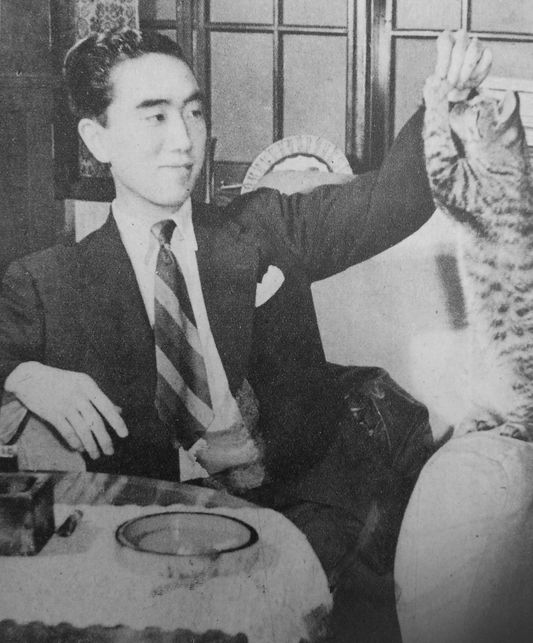
Mishima with his cat (Asahigraph, 12 May 1948 issue). He was known as a cat-lover. Yōko (his wife) was jealous of his pet cat, and disliked him petting it.

After Japan's defeat in World War II, the country was occupied by the U.S.-led Allied Powers. At the urging of the occupation authorities, many people who held important posts in various fields were purged from public office. The media and publishing industry were also censored, and were not allowed to engage in forms of expression reminiscent of wartime Japanese nationalism. (Note: In the occupation of Japan, SCAP executed "sword hunt", and 3 million swords which had been owned by the Japanese people were confiscated. Kendo was banned, and even when barely allowed in the form of "bamboo sword competition", SCAP severely banned kendo shouts, and, they banned Kabuki which had the revenge theme, or inspired the samurai spirit.) In addition, literary figures, including many of those who had been close to Mishima before the end of the war, were branded "war criminal literary figures." In response, many prominent literary figures became leftists, joined the Communist Party as a reaction against wartime militarism, and began writing socialist realist literature that might support the cause of socialist revolution. These newly converted leftists held great influence in the Japanese literary world immediately following the end of the war, which Mishima found difficult to accept, and he denounced them as "opportunists" in letters to friends. Although Mishima was just 20 years old at this time, he worried that his type of literature, based on the 1930s Japanese Romantic School (日本浪曼派, Nihon Rōman Ha), had already become obsolete.

Mishima had heard that the famed writer Yasunari Kawabata had praised his work before the end of the war. Uncertain of who else to turn to, Mishima took the manuscripts for The Middle Ages (中世, Chūsei) and The Cigarette (煙草, Tabako) with him, visited Kawabata in Kamakura, and asked for his advice and assistance in January 1946. Kawabata was impressed, and in June 1946, following Kawabata's recommendation, The Cigarette was published in the new literary magazine Humanity (人間, Ningen), followed by The Middle Ages in December 1946. The Middle Ages is set in Japan's historical Muromachi Period and explores the motif of shudō (man-boy love) against a backdrop of the death of the ninth Ashikaga shogun Ashikaga Yoshihisa in battle at the age of 25, and his father Ashikaga Yoshimasa's resultant sadness. The story features the fictional character Kikuwaka, a beautiful teenage boy who was beloved by both Yoshihisa and Yoshimasa, who fails in an attempt to follow Yoshihisa in death by committing suicide. Thereafter, Kikuwaka devotes himself to spiritualism in an attempt to heal Yoshimasa's sadness by allowing Yoshihisa's ghost to possess his body, and eventually dies in a double-suicide with a miko (shrine maiden) who falls in love with him. Mishima wrote the story in an elegant style drawing upon medieval Japanese literature and the Ryōjin Hishō, a collection of medieval imayō songs. This elevated writing style and the homosexual motif suggest the germ of Mishima's later aesthetics. Later in 1948 Kawabata, who praised this work, published an autobiographical work Boy (少年, Shōnen) describing his experience of falling in love for the first time with a boy two years his junior.

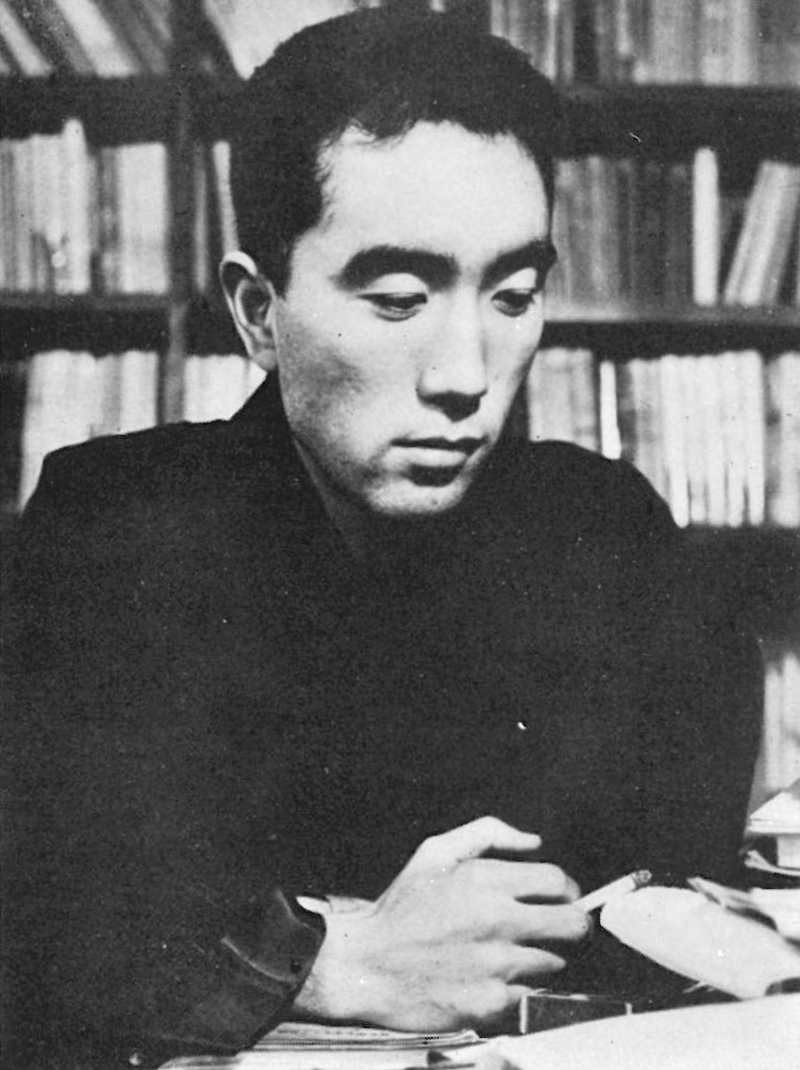
Mishima aged 28(in January 1953)

In 1946, Mishima began his first novel, Thieves (盗賊, Tōzoku), a story about two young members of the aristocracy drawn towards suicide. It was published in 1948, and placed Mishima in the ranks of the Second Generation of Postwar Writers. The following year, he published Confessions of a Mask, a semi-autobiographical account of a young homosexual man who hides behind a mask to fit into society. The novel was extremely successful and made Mishima a celebrity at the age of 24. In 1947, a brief encounter with Osamu Dazai, a popular novelist known for his suicidal themes, left a lasting impression on him. Around 1949, Mishima also published a literary essay about Kawabata, for whom he had always held a deep appreciation, in Modern Literature (近代文学, Kindai Bungaku).

Mishima enjoyed international travel. In 1952, he took a world tour and published his travelogue as The Cup of Apollo (アポロの杯, Aporo no Sakazuki). He visited Greece during his travels, a place which had fascinated him since childhood. His visit to Greece became the basis for his 1954 novel The Sound of Waves, which drew inspiration from the Greek myth of Daphnis and Chloe. The Sound of Waves, set on the small island of "Kami-shima" where a traditional Japanese lifestyle continued to be practiced, depicts a pure, simple love between a fisherman and a female pearl and abalone diver. Although the novel became a best-seller, leftists criticized it for "glorifying old-fashioned Japanese values" and some people began calling Mishima a "fascist." Looking back on these attacks in later years, Mishima wrote, "The ancient community ethics portrayed in this novel were attacked by progressives at the time, but no matter how much the Japanese people changed, these ancient ethics lurk in the bottom of their hearts. We have gradually seen this proven to be the case."

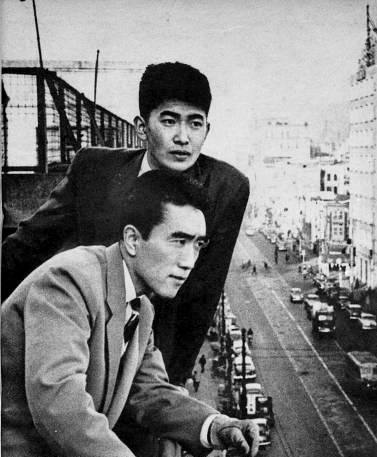
Yukio Mishima (lower) with Shintaro Ishihara in 1956 (on the roof of the Bungeishunjū Building in Ginza 6-chome)

Mishima made use of contemporary events in many of his works. The Temple of the Golden Pavilion, published in 1956, is a fictionalization of the burning down of the Kinkaku-ji Buddhist temple in Kyoto in 1950 by a mentally disturbed monk.

In 1959, Mishima published the artistically ambitious novel Kyōko no Ie. The novel tells the interconnected stories of four young men who represented four different facets of Mishima's personality. His athletic side appears as a boxer, his artistic side as a painter, his narcissistic, theatrical side as an actor, and his secretive, nihilistic side as a businessman who goes through the motions of living a normal life while practicing "absolute contempt for reality". According to Mishima, he was attempting to describe the time around 1955 in the novel, when Japan was entering into its era of high economic growth and the phrase "The postwar is over" was prevalent. (Note: In 1956, the Japanese government had issued an economic white paper that famously declared, "The postwar is now over" (Mohaya sengo de wa nai).) Mishima explained, "Kyōko no Ie is, so to speak, my research into the nihilism within me." Although the novel was well received by a small number of critics from the same generation as Mishima and sold 150,000 copies in a month, it was widely panned in broader literary circles, and was rapidly branded as Mishima's first "failed work". It was Mishima's first major setback as an author, and the book's disastrous reception came as a harsh psychological blow.

Until 1960, Mishima had not written works that were seen as especially political. In the summer of 1960, Mishima became interested in the massive Anpo protests against an attempt by U.S.-backed Prime Minister Nobusuke Kishi to revise the Treaty of Mutual Cooperation and Security Between the United States and Japan (known as "Anpo" in Japanese) in order to cement the U.S.-Japan military alliance into place. Although he did not directly participate in the protests, he often went out in the streets to observe the protestors in action and kept extensive newspaper clippings covering the protests. In June 1960, at the climax of the protest movement, Mishima wrote a commentary in the Mainichi Shinbun newspaper, entitled "A Political Opinion." In the critical essay, he argued that leftist groups such as the Zengakuren student federation, the Socialist Party, and the Communist Party were falsely wrapping themselves in the banner of "defending democracy" and using the protest movement to advance their own ends. Mishima warned against the dangers of the Japanese people following ideologues who told lies with honeyed words. Although Mishima criticized Kishi as a "nihilist" who had subordinated himself to the United States, Mishima concluded that he would rather vote for a strong-willed realist "with neither dreams nor despair" than a mendacious but eloquent ideologue.

Shortly after the Anpo Protests ended, Mishima began writing one of his most famous short stories, "Patriotism," glorifying the actions of a young, right-wing, ultranationalist Japanese army officer who commits suicide after a failed revolt against the government during the February 26 incident. The following year, he published the first two parts of his three-part play Tenth-Day Chrysanthemum (十日の菊, Tōka no kiku), which celebrates the actions of the 26 February revolutionaries.

Mishima's newfound interest in contemporary politics shaped his novel After the Banquet, also published in 1960, which so closely followed the events surrounding politician Hachirō Arita's campaign to become governor of Tokyo that Mishima was sued for invasion of privacy. The next year, Mishima published The Frolic of the Beasts, a parody of the classical Noh play Motomezuka, written in the 14th-century by playwright Kiyotsugu Kan'ami. In 1962, Mishima produced his most artistically avant-garde work Beautiful Star, which at times comes close to science fiction. Although the novel received mixed reviews from the literary world, prominent critic Takeo Okuno singled it out for praise as part of a new breed of novels that was overthrowing longstanding literary conventions in the tumultuous aftermath of the Anpo Protests. Alongside Kōbō Abe's Woman of the Dunes, published the same year, Okuno considered A Beautiful Star an "epoch-making work" which broke free of literary taboos and preexisting notions of what literature should be in order to explore the author's personal creativity.

In 1965, Mishima wrote the play Madame de Sade that explores the complex figure of the Marquis de Sade, traditionally upheld as an exemplar of vice, through a series of debates between six female characters including the Marquis's wife, the Madame de Sade. At the end of the play, Mishima offers his own interpretation of what he considered to be one of the central mysteries of the de Sade story—the Madame de Sade's unstinting support for her husband while he was in prison and her sudden decision to renounce him upon his release. Mishima's play was inspired in part by his friend Tatsuhiko Shibusawa's 1960 Japanese translation of the Marquis de Sade's novel Juliette and a 1964 biography Shibusawa wrote of de Sade. Shibusawa's sexually explicit translation became the focus of a sensational obscenity trial remembered in Japan as the "Juliette Case" (サド裁判, Sado saiban), which was ongoing as Mishima wrote the play. In 1994, Madame de Sade was evaluated as the "greatest drama in the history of postwar theater" by Japanese theater criticism magazine Theater Arts (シアター・アーツ).

Mishima was considered for the Nobel Prize for Literature in 1963, 1964, 1965, 1967 and 1968 (he and Rudyard Kipling are the two younger nominees in history), and was a favorite of many foreign publications. However, in 1968 his early mentor Kawabata won the Nobel Prize and Mishima realized that the chances of it being given to another Japanese author in the near future were slim. In a work published in 1970, Mishima wrote that the writers he paid most attention to in modern western literature were Georges Bataille, Pierre Klossowski, and Witold Gombrowicz.

=== Acting and modeling ===
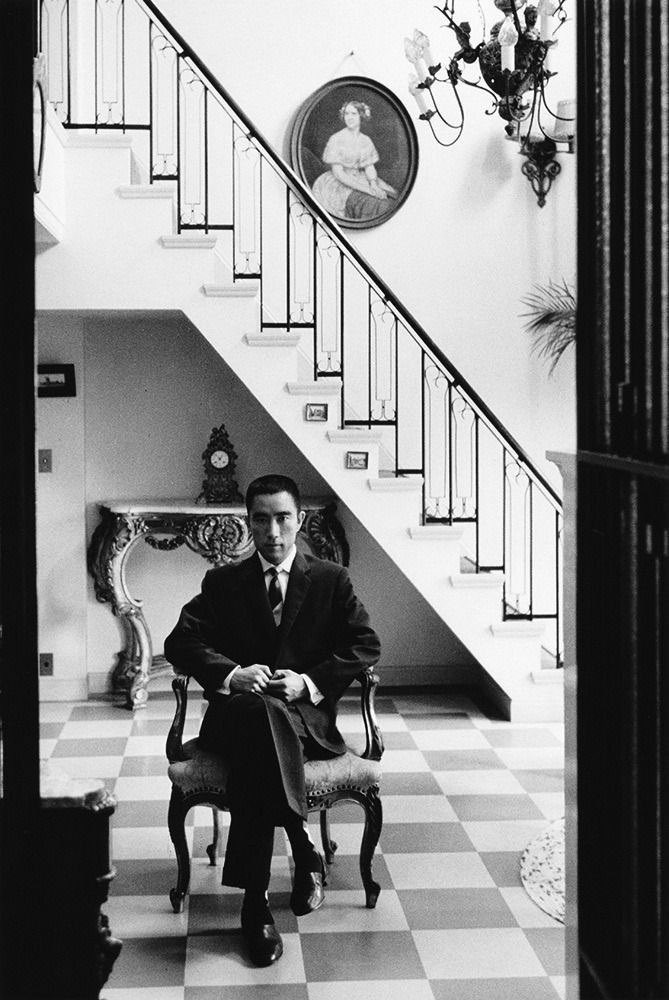
Mishima poses for a photograph, 1961

Mishima was also an actor, and starred in Yasuzo Masumura's 1960 film Afraid to Die, and he sang the theme song (lyrics by himself; music by Shichirō Fukazawa). He performed in films like Patriotism or the Rite of Love and Death directed by himself, 1966, Black Lizard directed by Kinji Fukasaku, 1968 and Hitokiri directed by Hideo Gosha, 1969. Maki Isaka has discussed how his knowledge of performance and theatrical forms influenced short stories including Onnagata (女方, Onnagata).

Mishima was featured as the photo model in the photographer Eikoh Hosoe's book Ba-ra-kei: Ordeal by Roses (薔薇刑, Bara-kei) and in Tamotsu Yatō's photobooks Young Samurai: Bodybuilders of Japan (体道～日本のボディビルダーたち, Taidō: Nihon no bodybuilder tachi) and Otoko: Photo Studies of the Young Japanese Male (男, Otoko). The American author Donald Richie gave an eyewitness account of seeing Mishima, dressed in a loincloth and armed with a sword, posing in the snow for one of Tamotsu Yatō's photoshoots.

In the men's magazine Heibon Punch, Mishima had contributed various essays and criticisms, and he won first place in the "Mr. Dandy" reader popularity poll in 1967 with 19,590 votes, beating Toshiro Mifune by 720 votes. In the next reader popularity poll, "Mr. International", Mishima ranked second behind French President Charles de Gaulle. At that time in the late 1960s, Mishima was the first celebrity to be described as a "superstar" (sūpāsutā) by the Japanese media.

=== Private life ===
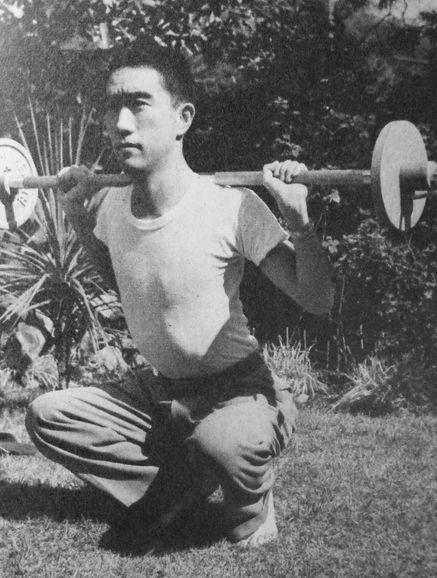
Mishima at age 30 in his garden, 1955

In 1955, Mishima took up weight training to overcome his weak constitution, and his strictly observed workout regimen of three sessions per week was not disrupted for the final 15 years of his life. In his 1968 essay Sun and Steel, Mishima deplored the emphasis given by intellectuals to the mind over the body. He later became very skilled (5th Dan) at kendo (traditional Japanese swordsmanship), and became 2nd Dan in battōjutsu, and 1st Dan in karate. In 1956, he tried boxing for a short period of time. In the same year, he developed an interest in UFOs and became a member of the "Japan Flying Saucer Research Association" (日本空飛ぶ円盤研究会, Nihon soratobu enban kenkyukai).

In 1954, he fell in love with Sadako Toyoda (豊田貞子), who became the model for main characters in The Sunken Waterfall (沈める滝, Shizumeru taki) and The Seven Bridges (橋づくし, Hashi zukushi). Mishima hoped to marry her, but they broke up in 1957. After briefly considering marriage with Michiko Shōda, who later married Crown Prince Akihito and became Empress Michiko, Mishima married Yōko (瑤子; née Sugiyama), the daughter of the Japanese-style painter Yasushi Sugiyama, on 1 June 1958. The couple had two children: a daughter named Noriko (紀子) (born 2 June 1959) and a son named Iichirō (威一郎) (born 2 May 1962). Noriko eventually married the diplomat Koji Tomita.

While working on his novel Forbidden Colors, Mishima visited gay bars in Japan. Mishima's sexual orientation was an issue that bothered his wife, and she always denied his homosexuality after his death. In 1998, the writer Jirō Fukushima (福島次郎) published an account of his relationship with Mishima in 1951, including fifteen letters (not love letters) from Mishima. Mishima's children successfully sued Fukushima and the publisher for copyright violation over the use of Mishima's letters. The publisher Bungeishunjū had argued that the contents of the letters were "practical correspondence" rather than copyrighted works. However, the ruling for the plaintiffs declared, "In addition to clerical content, these letters describe the Mishima's own feelings, his aspirations, and his views on life, in different words from those in his literary works." (Note: As for the evaluation of Fukushima's book, it is attracting attention as material for learning about Mishima's friendships when writing Forbidden Colors; however, there were criticisms that this book confused readers because it was written the real names of all characters like a nonfiction, at the same time, Fukushima specified "a novel about Mr. Yukio Mishima", "this work", "this novel" in the introduction and epilogue or it was advertised as "an autobiographical novel", so the publisher didn't have the confidence to say that everything was true; the only valuable accounts in this book were Mishima's letters. Also there were vitriolic criticisms that these contents of book was insignificant compared to its exaggerated advertising, or it was pointed out that there were contradictions and unnatural adaptations like a made-up story in the neighborhood of gay bars. Gō Itasaka (板坂剛), who thinks Mishima was homosexual, said about this book as below, "Fukusima's petty touch only described a petty Mishima, Mishima was sometimes vulgar, but was never a narrow-minded man. The complex which Mishima himself kept holding like a poison in his own (is like available for use at any time), was not always an aversion for him." Jakucho Setouchi and Akihiro Miwa said about this book and Fukusima: "It's the worst way for a man or a woman to write bad words about someone you once liked, and Fukusima is ingrateful, because he had been taken care of in various ways when he was poor, by Mishima and his parents.")

In February 1961, Mishima became embroiled in the aftermath of the Shimanaka incident. In 1960, the author Shichirō Fukazawa had published the satirical short story The Tale of an Elegant Dream (風流夢譚, Fūryū Mutan) in the mainstream magazine Chūō Kōron. It contained a dream sequence (in which the emperor and empress are beheaded by a guillotine) that led to outrage from right-wing, ultra-nationalist groups, and numerous death threats against Fukazawa, any writers believed to have been associated with him, and Chūō Kōron magazine. On 1 February 1961, Kazutaka Komori, a 17-year-old rightist, broke into the home of Hōji Shimanaka, the president of Chūō Kōron, killed his maid with a knife and severely wounded his wife. In the aftermath, Fukazawa went into hiding, and dozens of writers and literary critics, including Mishima, were provided with round-the-clock police protection for several months; Mishima was included because a rumor became widespread that Mishima had personally recommended The Tale of an Elegant Dream for publication, and even though he repeatedly denied the claim, he received hundreds of death threats. In later years, Mishima harshly criticized Komori, arguing that those who harm women and children are neither patriots nor traditional right-wingers, and that an assassination attempt should be a one-on-one confrontation with the victim at the risk of the assassin's life. Mishima also argued that it was the custom of traditional Japanese patriots (such as Otoya Yamaguchi) to immediately commit suicide after committing an assassination.

In 1963, "The Harp of Joy Incident" (喜びの琴事件, Yorokobi no Koto Jiken) occurred within the theatrical troupe Bungakuza, to which Mishima belonged. He wrote a play titled The Harp of Joy (喜びの琴, Yorokobi no koto), but star actress Haruko Sugimura and other Communist Party-affiliated actors refused to perform because the protagonist held anti-communist views and mentioned criticism about a conspiracy of world communism in his lines. As a result of this ideological conflict, Mishima quit Bungakuza and later formed the troupe Neo Littérature Théâtre (劇団NLT, Gekidan NLT) with playwrights and actors who had quit Bungakuza along with him, including Seiichi Yashio (矢代静一), Takeo Matsuura (松浦竹夫), and Nobuo Nakamura. When Neo Littérature Théâtre experienced a schism in 1968, Mishima formed another troupe, the Roman Theatre (浪曼劇場, Rōman Gekijō), and worked with Matsuura and Nakamura again.

During the 1964 Summer Olympics in Tokyo, Mishima interviewed various athletes every day and wrote articles as a newspaper correspondent. He had eagerly anticipated the long-awaited return of the Olympics to Japan after the 1940 Tokyo Olympics were cancelled due to Japan's war in China. Mishima expressed his excitement in his report on the opening ceremonies: "It can be said that ever since Lafcadio Hearn called the Japanese "the Greeks of the Orient", the Olympics were destined to be hosted by Japan someday."

Mishima hated Ryokichi Minobe, who was a socialist and the governor of Tokyo beginning in 1967. Influential persons in the conservative Liberal Democratic Party (LDP), including Takeo Fukuda and Kiichi Aichi, had been Mishima's superiors during his time at the Ministry of Finance, and Prime Minister Eisaku Satō came to know Mishima because his wife, Hiroko, was a fan of Mishima's work. Based on these connections LDP officials solicited Mishima to run for the LDP as governor of Tokyo against Minobe, but Mishima had no intention of becoming a politician.

Mishima was fond of manga and gekiga, especially the drawing style of Hiroshi Hirata, a mangaka best known for his samurai gekiga; the slapstick, absurdist comedy in Fujio Akatsuka's Mōretsu Atarō; and the imaginativeness of Shigeru Mizuki's GeGeGe no Kitarō. Mishima especially loved reading the boxing manga Ashita no Joe in Weekly Shōnen Magazine every week. (Note: On one occasion, when Mishima missed the new issue of Weekly Shōnen Magazine on its release day because he had been shooting the movie Black Lizard, at midnight he suddenly appeared in the magazine's editorial department and demanded, "I want you to sell to me the Weekly Shōnen Magazine just released today.") Ultraman and Godzilla were his favorite kaiju fantasies, and he once compared himself to "Godzilla's egg" in 1955. On the other hand, he disliked story manga with humanist or cosmopolitan themes, such as Osamu Tezuka's Phoenix.

Mishima was a fan of science fiction, contending that "science fiction will be the first literature to completely overcome modern humanism". He praised Arthur C. Clarke's Childhood's End in particular. While acknowledging "inexpressible unpleasant and uncomfortable feelings after reading it," he said "I'm not afraid to call it a masterpiece."

Mishima traveled to Shimoda on the Izu Peninsula with his wife and children every summer from 1964. In Shimoda, Mishima often enjoyed eating local seafood with his friend Henry Scott-Stokes. Mishima never showed any hostility towards the US in front of foreign friends like Scott-Stokes, until Mishima heard that the name of the inn where Scott-Stokes was staying was Kurofune (lit. 'black ship'), at which point his voice suddenly became low and he said in a sullen manner, "Why? Why do you stay at a place with such a name?". Mishima liked ordinary American people after the war, and he and his wife visited Disneyland as newlyweds. (Note: After that, Disneyland became Mishima's favorite. And, in the New Year of 1970, the year he was determined to die, he had wanted the whole family with children to revisit the fantasy theme park. But the dream didn't come true because of his wife's objection that she wanted to do it after the completion of The Sea of Fertility.) However, he clearly retained a strong sense of hostility toward the "black ships" of Commodore Matthew C. Perry, who forcibly opened Japan up to unequal international relations at the end of the Edo period, and had destroyed the peace of Edo, where vivid chōnin culture was flourishing.

=== Later life ===
Mishima's nationalism grew toward the end of his life. In 1966, he published his short story "Voices of the Fallen Heroes", in which he denounced Emperor Hirohito for renouncing his own divinity after World War II. Mishima argued that the soldiers who had died in the February 26 incident and the Kamikaze had died for their "living god" emperor, and that Hirohito's renunciation of his own divinity meant that all those deaths had been in vain.

In February 1967, Mishima joined his fellow-authors Yasunari Kawabata, Kōbō Abe, and Jun Ishikawa in issuing a statement condemning China's Cultural Revolution for suppressing academic and artistic freedom. However, only one Japanese newspaper carried the full text of their statement.

In September 1967 Mishima and his wife visited India at the invitation of the Indian government. He traveled widely and met with Prime Minister Indira Gandhi and President Zakir Hussain. He left extremely impressed by Indian culture, and what he felt was the Indian people's determination to resist Westernization and protect traditional ways. Mishima feared that his fellow Japanese were too enamored of modernization and Western-style materialism to protect traditional Japanese culture. On his way home from India, Mishima also stopped in Thailand and Laos; his experiences in the three nations became the basis for portions of his novel The Temple of Dawn, the third in his tetralogy The Sea of Fertility.

In a series of critical essays in the late 1960s, Mishima exalted what he viewed as traditional Japanese values. In 1967, he published On Hagakure: The Samurai Ethic and Modern Japan (葉隠入門, Hagakure Nyūmon), an impassioned plea for a return to bushido, the putative "samurai code" of Japan's past. Mishima praised the Hagakure, a treatise on warrior virtues authored by the samurai Yamamoto Tsunetomo during the Edo period that valorized the warrior's willingness to die, as being at the core of his literary production and "the source of his vitality as a writer". Mishima concluded,

What Hagakure is insisting is that even a merciless death, a futile death that bears neither flower nor fruit, has dignity as the death of a human being. If we value so highly the dignity of life, how can we not also value the dignity of death? No death may be called futile.

Mishima's critique of postwar Japan largely is related to the rapid economic growth (economic miracle) displayed by the growth of capitalism. While the economic miracle brought Japan global influence, scholars claim that this created cultural problems. Mishima aligned with the view of cultural decay brought about from this economic growth. Yukio Mishima perceived Imperial Japan to be a spiritually rich society. Mishima expressed his concerns of Japan abandoning discipline, sacrifice, and national identity in exchange for comfort and consumerism. The political consequences of Japan's rapid economic growth had created civil unrest. Postwar Japan was defined by this economic growth and influence from the United States bloated consumerism. Mishima's writings and public affairs shined light upon his views of postwar society crippling the countries future.

In On the Defense of Culture (文化防衛論, Bunka bōei ron; 1968), Mishima preached the centrality of the emperor to Japanese culture, and argued that Japan's postwar era was a time of flashy but ultimately hollow prosperity (a "Shōwa Genroku"), lacking any truly transcendent literary or poetic talents comparable to the 18th century masters of the original Genroku era, such as the playwright Chikamatsu Monzaemon or the poet Matsuo Bashō.

In 1968, Mishima wrote a play titled My Friend Hitler, in which he depicted the historical figures of Adolf Hitler, Gustav Krupp, Gregor Strasser, and Ernst Röhm as mouthpieces to express his own views on fascism and beauty. Mishima explained that after writing the all-female play Madame de Sade, he wanted to write a counterpart play with an all-male cast. Mishima wrote of My Friend Hitler, "You may read this tragedy as an allegory of the relationship between Ōkubo Toshimichi and Saigō Takamori" (two heroes of Japan's Meiji Restoration who initially worked together but later had a falling out). Given the play's provocative title, Mishima was repeatedly asked if he intended to express admiration or support for Hitler. Mishima wrote in a program note,

To be honest, I feel a terrifying interest in Hitler, but if the question is whether I like or dislike him, I can only answer, I don't like him. Hitler was a political genius but was not a hero. He thoroughly lacked the refreshing, sunny quality indispensable to becoming a hero. Hitler is as gloomy as the twentieth century.

That same year, he wrote Life for Sale, a humorous story about a man who, after attempting suicide, advertises his life for sale. In a review of the English translation, the novelist Ian Thomson called it a "pulp noir" and a "sexy, camp delight", but also noted that, "beneath the hard-boiled dialogue and the gangster high jinks is a familiar indictment of consumerist Japan and a romantic yearning for the past."

Like many other right-wingers, Mishima was extremely alarmed by the riots and revolutionary actions undertaken by radical "New Left" university students, who took over dozens of college campuses in Japan in 1968 and 1969. On 25 February 1968, he and several other right-wingers met at the editorial offices of the recently founded minzoku-ha monthly magazine Controversy Journal (論争ジャーナル, Ronsō jaanaru), where they pricked their little fingers and signed a blood oath promising to die if necessary to prevent a left-wing revolution from occurring in Japan. Mishima showed his sincerity by signing his birth name, Kimitake Hiraoka, in his own blood.

On 13 May 1969, Mishima accepted an invitation to debate with members of the Tokyo University Zenkyōtō on the university's Komaba campus. This debate lasted for 2.5 hours, with both Mishima and the students treating each other amiably and with respect, despite Mishima's initial fears that the students might kill him on the spot for his right-wing views. (Note: A record of this debate was published in June 1969 by Shinchōsha under the title Debate: Yukio Mishima vs. Tokyo University Zenkyōtō - Beauty, Community, and the Tokyo University Struggle (討論 三島由紀夫vs.東大全共闘―美と共同体と東大闘争, Tōron: Mishima Yukio vs. Tokyo University Zenkyōtō - bi to kyōdōtai to Todai ronsō).) At this debate, Mishima told the students, "As long as you refer to the Emperor as 'Emperor,' I will gladly join forces with you," but in the end the ideological differences between Mishima and the students could not be overcome. Mishima ended by saying, "I believe in your passion. I believe in this alone. Even if I believe in nothing else of yours, I want you to know that I believe in this alone." In an essay written after the debate Mishima said that "they could not escape established leftist thinking" and that "the discussion was inevitably at a stalemate." In this essay, Mishima argued that the supposedly revolutionary Zenkyōtō were themselves "weakening the roots of the revolutionary ideal in Japan" by rejecting the idea of the "Emperor", which Mishima claimed was also "a revolutionary ideal deeply rooted in the consciousness of the Japanese people." Mishima's friends interpreted this essay as him expressing his disappointment with the Zenkyōtō. (Note: Journalist Masayasu Hosaka (保阪正康) argues that the reason "Mishima was disappointed" after this debate was because the Zenkyōtō "was ultimately unwilling to defend their political slogans even at the risk of their own lives" and because of their "worldly speech and self-indulgent behavior", and that Mishima saw through their "limitations".)

In these days, Mishima wrote many essays and gave many dialogues about Japan and Japanese culture. In a dialogue about what you would die for as a Japanese, he stated that "protecting freedom," "protecting democracy," or "protecting a certain political system" were "secondary issues," not essential issues, and that he could not imagine dying for them. He argued that the ultimate values that should be protected were the "Three Sacred Treasures," which represent the identity of Japanese culture, and the Emperor.

Throughout this period, Mishima continued to work on his magnum opus The Sea of Fertility tetralogy of novels, which began appearing in a monthly serialized format in September 1965. The four completed novels were Spring Snow (1969), Runaway Horses (1969), The Temple of Dawn (1970), and The Decay of the Angel (published posthumously in 1971). Mishima aimed for a very long novel with a completely different raison d'être from Western chronicle novels of the 19th and 20th centuries; rather than telling the story of a single individual or family, Mishima boldly set his goal as interpreting the entire human world. In The Sea of Fertility, four stories convey the transmigration of the human soul as the main character goes through a series of reincarnations. Mishima hoped to express in literary terms something akin to pantheism. The novelist Paul Theroux wrote a blurb for the first edition of the English translation of The Sea of Fertility as "the most complete vision we have of Japan in the twentieth century" and critic Charles Solomon wrote in 1990 that "the four novels remain one of the outstanding works of 20th-Century literature and a summary of the author's life and work".

=== Coup attempt and suicide ===
From 12 April to 27 May 1967, Mishima underwent basic training with the Ground Self-Defense Force (GSDF). Mishima had originally lobbied to train with the GSDF for six months, but was met with resistance from the Defense Agency. Mishima's training period was finalized to 46 days, which required using some of his connections. His participation in GSDF training was kept secret, both because the Defense Agency did not want to give the impression that anyone was receiving special treatment, and because Mishima wanted to experience "real" military life. Accordingly, Mishima trained under his birth name, Kimitake Hiraoka, and most of his fellow soldiers did not recognize him.

From June 1967, Mishima became a leading figure in a plan to create a 10,000-man "Japan National Guard" (祖国防衛隊, Sokoku Bōeitai) as a civilian complement to the Self-Defense Forces. He began leading groups of right-wing college students to undergo basic training with the GSDF in the hope of training 100 officers to lead the National Guard.

Finding that his plan for a large-scale Japan National Guard with broad public and private support had failed to catch on, Mishima formed the Tatenokai ("Shield Society"), a private militia composed primarily of right-wing college students, on 5 October 1968. Mishima accepted no outside money, and funded the activities of the Tatenokai using royalties from his writing. The Tatenokai primarily focused on martial training and physical fitness, including traditional kendo sword-fighting and long-distance running. Live-fire training was also conducted. Mishima personally oversaw this training. Initial membership was around 50, and was drawn primarily from students from Waseda University and individuals affiliated with the Controversy Journal. The number of Tatenokai members was later increased to exactly 100.

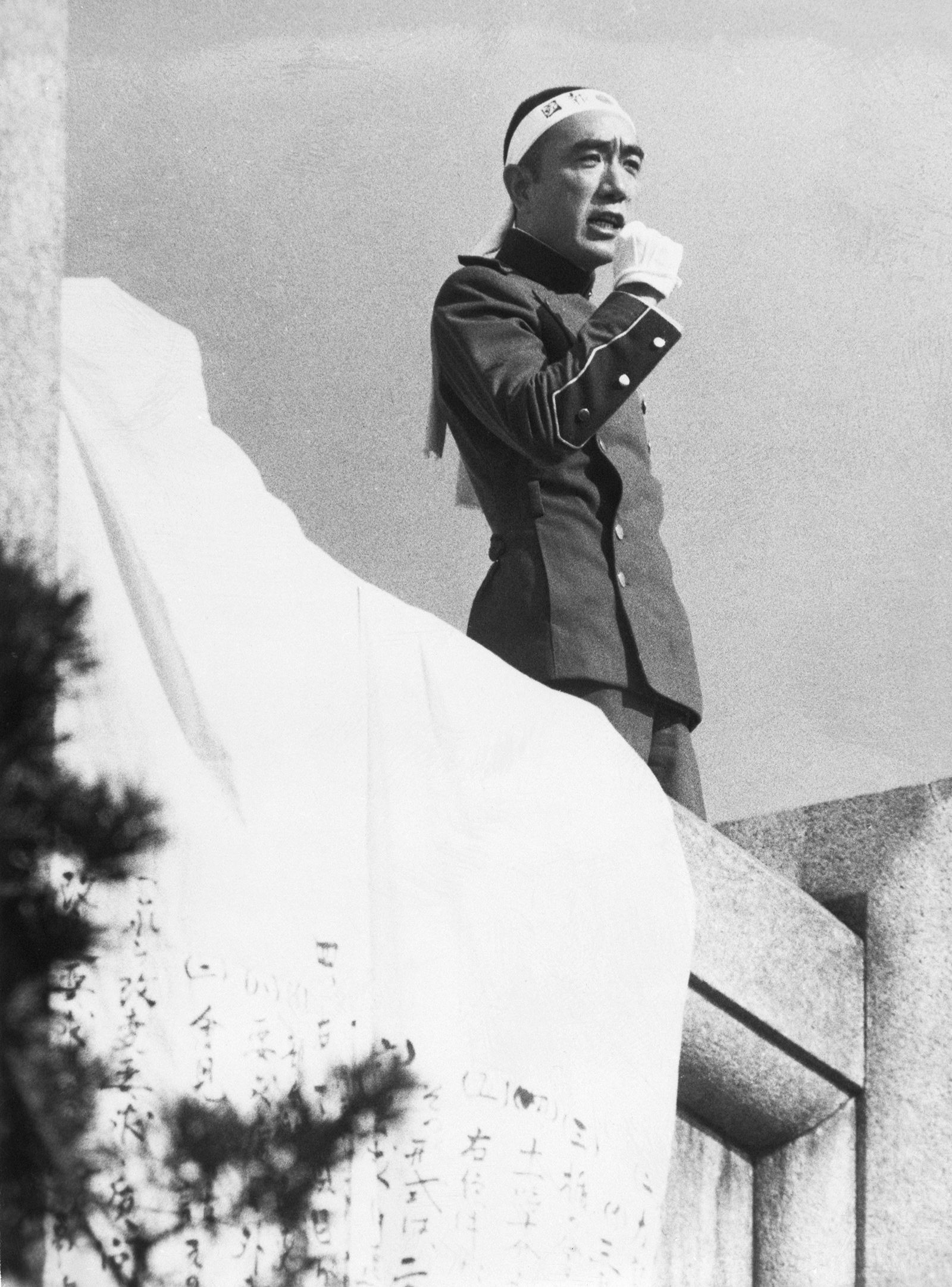
Mishima delivering his speech on the balcony, 25 November 1970

On 25 November 1970, Mishima and four members of the Tatenokai—Masakatsu Morita, Masahiro Ogawa (小川正洋), Masayoshi Koga (小賀正義), and Hiroyasu Koga—used a pretext to visit Lieutenant General Kanetoshi Mashita (益田兼利), the commandant of Camp Ichigaya (防衛省市ヶ谷地区), a military base in central Tokyo and the headquarters of the Eastern Command of the Japan Self-Defense Forces. Once inside, they barricaded the door to Mashita's office and tied him to his chair. Mishima wore a white hachimaki headband with a red hinomaru circle in the center bearing the kanji for "To be reborn seven times to serve the country" (七生報國, Shichishō hōkoku), a reference to the last words of Kusunoki Masasue, the younger brother of the 14th-century imperial loyalist samurai Kusunoki Masashige, as the two brothers died fighting to defend the emperor.

Holding a prepared manifesto and a banner listing their demands, Mishima stepped out onto the balcony to address the soldiers gathered below. His speech was intended to inspire a coup d'état to restore direct rule to the emperor. He succeeded only in irritating the soldiers, and was heckled, with jeers and the noise of helicopters drowning out some parts of his speech. In his speech, Mishima rebuked the JSDF for its passive acceptance of a constitution that "denies (their) own existence" and shouted "Where has the spirit of the samurai gone?" In a final written appeal titled Geki, copies of which Morita and Ogawa scattered from the balcony, Mishima expressed his dissatisfaction with the half-baked nature of the JSDF: "It is self-evident that the United States would not be pleased with a true Japanese volunteer army protecting the land of Japan." Scholars argue that Mishima's rebellion was less about militarism itself and more about resisting Japan's total submission to U.S. democratic ideals, which he saw as a direct opposition to Japanese imperialistic tradition. Mishima emphasized the importance of the emperor to Japanese culture. The emperor's loss of status and authority was a significant motivation for Mishima's attempted coup; he argued that this loss reflected a broader loss of national identity and culture.

After he finished reading his prepared speech in a few minutes' time, Mishima cried out "Long live the Emperor!" (天皇陛下万歳, Tenno-heika banzai) three times. He then retreated into the commandant's office and apologized to the commandant, saying, "We did it to return the JSDF to the Emperor. I had no choice but to do this." Mishima then committed seppuku, a form of ritual suicide by disembowelment associated with the samurai. Morita had been assigned to serve as Mishima's second (kaishakunin), cutting off his head with a sword at the end of the rite to spare him unnecessary pain. However, Morita proved unable to complete his task, and after three failed attempts to sever Mishima's head, Hiroyasu Koga had to step in and complete the task.

According to the testimony of the surviving coup members, originally all four Tatenokai members had planned to commit seppuku along with Mishima. However, Mishima attempted to dissuade them and three of the members acquiesced to his wishes. Only Morita persisted, saying, "I can't let Mr. Mishima die alone." However, Mishima knew that Morita had a girlfriend and still hoped he might live. Just before his seppuku, Mishima tried one more time to dissuade him, saying "Morita, you must live, not die." (Note: This is the survived member Masayoshi Koga (小賀正義)'s testimony.) (Note: Morita had a girlfriend named Yumiko Shibata (柴田由美子). Her first grandchild was named "Masakatsu".) Nevertheless, after Mishima's seppuku, Morita knelt and stabbed himself in the abdomen and Koga acted as kaishakunin again. Another traditional element of the suicide ritual was the composition of death poems by the Tatenokai members prior to their entry into the headquarters.

This coup attempt is called the "Mishima Incident" (三島事件, Mishima jiken) in Japan. (Note: Immediately after the incident, Yasunari Kawabata rushed to the Ichigaya camp, but was unable to enter the commandant's room during on-the-spot investigation. (Kawabata insisted that reports claiming "Kawabata was admitted to the bloody death scene" were false.))

Mishima had planned his suicide meticulously for at least a year, and no one outside a small group of hand-picked Tatenokai members knew of his plan. Mishima had made sure his affairs were in order and left money for the legal defense of the three surviving Tatenokai members involved in the incident. Mishima had also arranged for a department store to send his two children Christmas gifts every year until they became adults, and had asked a publisher to pay the long-term subscription fee for children's magazines in advance and deliver them every month.

Much speculation has surrounded Mishima's suicide. One of Mishima's biographers, translator John Nathan, suggests that the coup attempt was only a pretext for the ritual suicide of which Mishima had long dreamed. Mishima's friend Henry Scott-Stokes, another biographer and journalist, noted a meeting with Mishima in his diary entry for 3 September 1970 at which Mishima, with a dark expression on his face, said:

Japan has lost its spiritual tradition, and instead has become infested with materialism. Japan is under the curse of a green snake. There is a green snake in the bosom of Japan. There is no way to escape this curse.

In 1990, Scott-Stokes told Takao Tokuoka (徳岡孝夫), who was entrusted with the Geki by Mishima just before the Mishima Incident, that he understood the meaning of "green snake" was the U.S. dollar.

One researcher has speculated that Mishima chose 25 November for his coup attempt in order to set his period of bardo until his reincarnation, such that the 49th day after his death would coincide with his birthday, 14 January. Mishima's remains were returned to his family the day after the incident, and were buried in the grave of the Hiraoka family at Tama Cemetery on what would have been his 46th birthday, 14 January 1971.

== Legacy ==
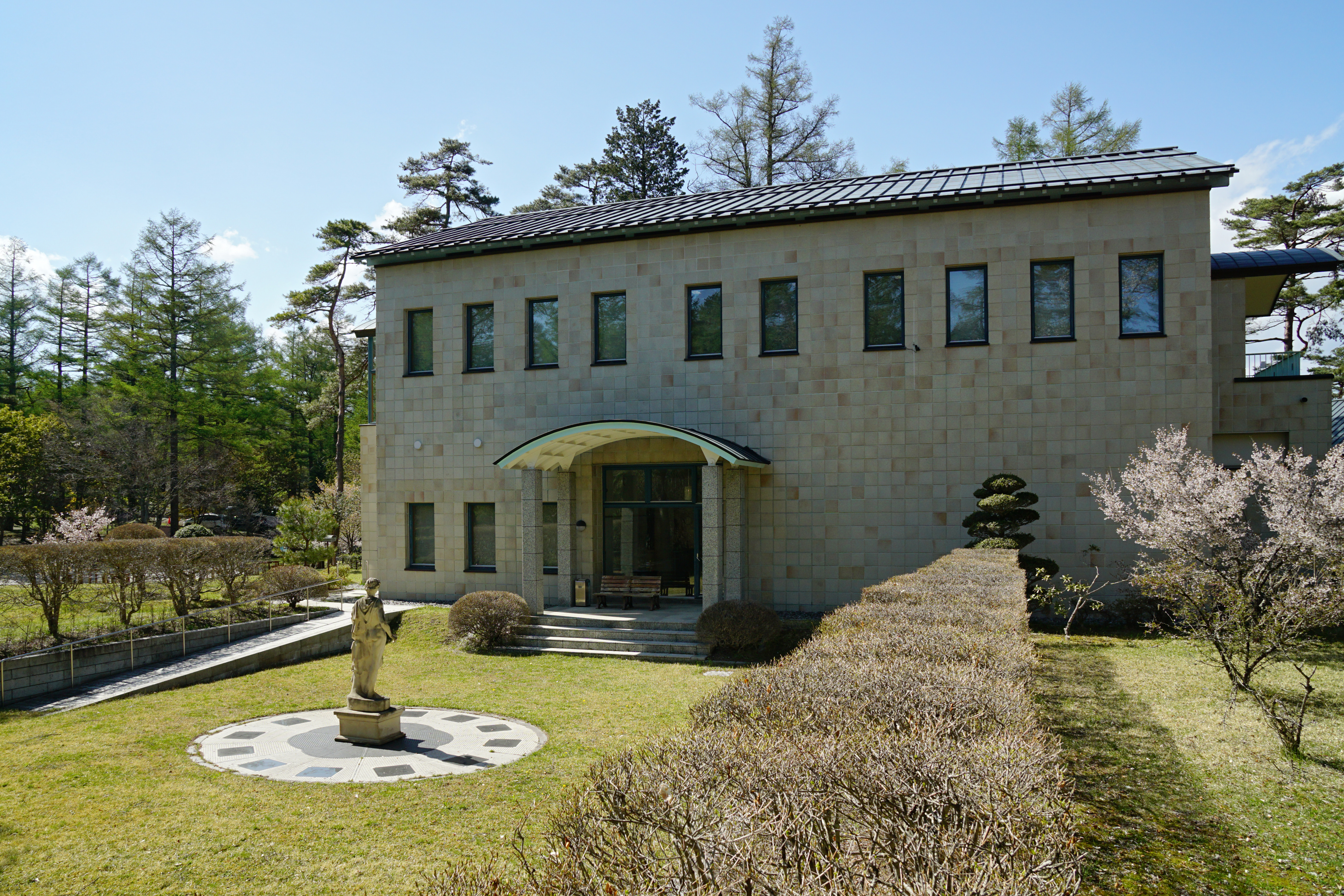
Mishima Yukio Literary Museum in Yamanakako, Yamanashi

Mishima has been recognized as one of the world's important literary persons of the 20th century. Mishima wrote 34 novels, approximately 50 plays and 25 books of short stories, more than 35 books of essays, a libretto, and one film.

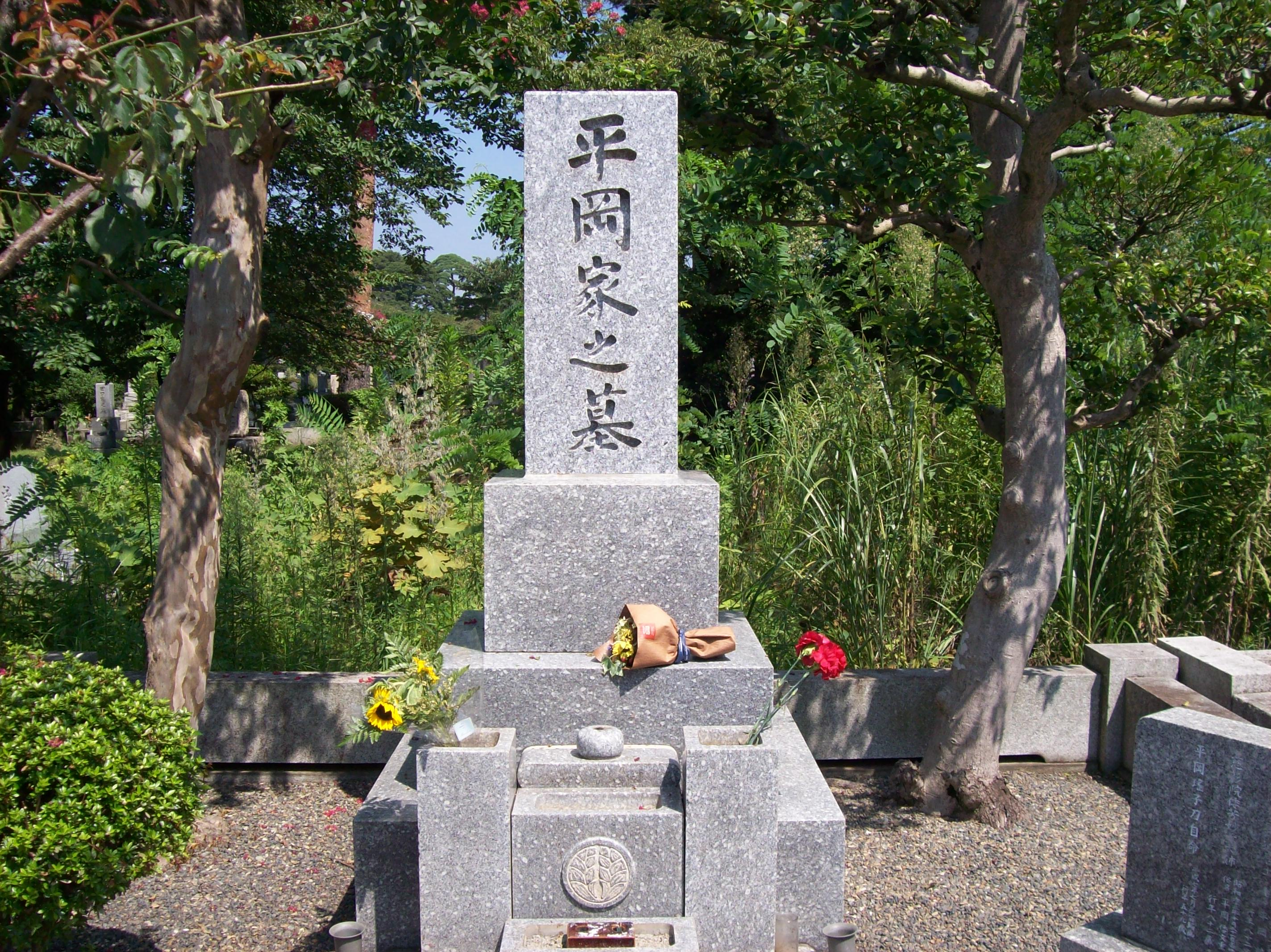
Grave of Yukio Mishima in Tama Cemetery. The inscription reads, "Grave of Hiraoka family".

The annual Mishima Prize was established in 1998 by the literary publisher Shinchōsha to recognise groundbreaking Japanese literature. On 3 July 1999, the "Yukio Mishima Literary Museum" (三島由紀夫文学館, Mishima Yukio Bungaku-kan) opened in Yamanakako.

The Mishima Incident helped inspire the formation of "New Right" (新右翼, shin uyoku) groups in Japan, such as the "Issuikai", founded by Tsutomu Abe (阿部勉), who was one of Tatenokai members and Mishima's follower. Compared to older pro-American, anti-communist groups such as Bin Akao's Greater Japan Patriotic Party, New Right groups such as the Issuikai tended to emphasize ethnic nationalism and anti-Americanism.

A memorial service deathday for Mishima, called "Patriotism Memorial" (憂国忌, Yūkoku-ki), is held every year in Japan on 25 November by the "Yukio Mishima Study Group" (三島由紀夫研究会, Mishima Yukio Kenkyūkai), as well as former members of the "Japan Student Alliance" (日本学生同盟, Nihon Gakusei Dōmei). A separate memorial service has also been held annually by former Tatenokai members from 1975 onwards, one year after Masahiro Ogawa, Masayoshi Koga, and Hiroyasu Koga were released on parole.

A variety of cenotaphs and memorial stones have been erected in honor of Mishima's memory in various places around Japan. For example, stones have been erected at Hachiman Shrine in Kakogawa City, Hyōgo Prefecture, where his grandfather's permanent domicile was; in front of the 2nd company corps at JGSDF Camp Takigahara; and in one of Mishima's acquaintance's home garden. There is also a "Monument of Honor Yukio Mishima & Masakatsu Morita" in front of the Rissho University Shonan High school in Shimane Prefecture.

The Mishima Yukio Shrine was built in the suburb of Fujinomiya on 9 January 1983.

A 1985 biographical film by Paul Schrader titled Mishima: A Life in Four Chapters depicts his life and work, however it has not had a theatrical release inside Japan until 2025. A 2012 Japanese film titled 11:25 The Day He Chose His Own Fate examines Mishima's final day. The 1983 gay pornographic film Beautiful Mystery satirized homosexual undertones that were present during Mishima's career.

In 2020, a documentary titled Mishima Yukio vs. Tokyo University Zenkyōtō: the Truth Revealed 50 Years Later (三島由紀夫vs東大全共闘〜50年目の真実〜, Mishima Yukio vs Todai Zenkyōtō〜50 nen me no Sinjitsu) was released, based on the debate between Mishima and members of the University of Tokyo Zenkyōtō on 13 May 1969.

On 14 January 2025, commemorative events to mark the 100th anniversary of Mishima's birth was held at two halls in Tokyo, in which Eiko Muramatsu (村松英子), who was an actress of Mishima's troupe, and Tadanori Yokoo, an acquaintance of Mishima, talked at each venue about their memories of him.

== Awards ==
- Shincho Prize from Shinchosha Publishing, 1954, for The Sound of Waves
- Kishida Prize for Drama from Shinchosha Publishing, 1955 for Termites' Nest (白蟻の巣, Shiroari no Su)
- Yomiuri Prize from Yomiuri Newspaper Co., for best novel, 1956, The Temple of the Golden Pavilion
- Shuukan Yomiuri Prize for Shingeki from Yomiuri Newspaper Co., 1958, for Rose and Pirate (薔薇と海賊, Bara to Kaizoku)
- Yomiuri Prize from Yomiuri Newspaper Co., for best drama, 1961, The Chrysanthemum on the Tenth (The Day After the Fair) (十日の菊, Tōka no kiku)
- One of six finalists for the Nobel Prize in Literature, 1963.
- Mainichi Art Prize from Mainichi Shimbun, 1964, for Silk and Insight
- Art Festival Prize from the Ministry of Education, 1965, for Madame de Sade

== Portrayals ==
=== Collections of photographs ===
- Ba-ra-kei: Ordeal by Roses (薔薇刑) by Eikō Hosoe and Mishima (photoerotic collection of images of Mishima, with his own commentary, 1963) (Aperture 2002 ISBN 0-89381-169-6)
- Grafica: Yukio Mishima (Grafica Mishima Yukio (グラフィカ三島由紀夫)) by Kōichi Saitō, Kishin Shinoyama, Takeyoshi Tanuma, Ken Domon, Masahisa Fukase, Eikō Hosoe, Ryūji Miyamoto etc. (photoerotic collection of Yukio Mishima) (Shinchosha 1990 ISBN 978-4-10-310202-1)
- Yukio Mishima's house (Mishima Yukio no Ie (三島由紀夫の家)) by Kishin Shinoyama (Bijutsu Shuppansha 1995 ISBN 978-4-568-12055-4)
- The Death of a Man (Otoko no shi (男の死)) by Kishin Shinoyama and Mishima (photo collection of death images of Japanese men including a sailor, a construction worker, a fisherman, and a soldier, those were Mishima did modeling in 1970) (Rizzoli 2020 ISBN 978-0-8478-6869-8)

=== Books ===
- Reflections on the Death Of Mishima by Henry Miller (1972, ISBN 0-912264-38-1)
- The Day He Himself Shall Wipe My Tears Away (Mizukara waga namida wo nuguitamau hi (みずから我が涙をぬぐいたまう日)) by Kenzaburō Ōe (Kodansha, 1972, NCID BN04777478) – In addition to this, Kenzaburō Ōe wrote several works that mention the Mishima incident and Mishima a little.
- The Head of Yukio Mishima (Mishima Yukio no Kubi (三島由紀夫の首)) by Tetsuji Takechi (Toshi shuppann, 1972, NCID BN05185496) - A mysterious tale of Mishima's head flying over the Kantō region and arguing with the head of Taira no Masakado.
- Mishima: A Biography by John Nathan (Boston, Little, Brown and Company 1974, ISBN 0-316-59844-5)
- Scott-Stokes, Henry (1974). The Life and Death of Yukio Mishima. New York: Farrar, Straus and Giroux. NCID BA10429419.
- La mort volontaire au Japon, by Maurice Pinguet (Gallimard, 1984 ISBN 2070701891)
- Der Magnolienkaiser: Nachdenken über Yukio Mishima by Hans Eppendorfer (1984, ISBN 3924040087)
- Teito Monogatari (vol. 5–10) by Hiroshi Aramata (a historical fantasy novel. Mishima appears in series No. 5, and he reincarnates a woman Michiyo Ohsawa in series No. 6), (Kadokawa Shoten 1985 ISBN 4-04-169005-6)
- Yukio Mishima by Peter Wolfe ("reviews Mishima's life and times, discusses, his major works, and looks at important themes in his novels", 1989, ISBN 0-8264-0443-X)
- Escape from the Wasteland: Romanticism and Realism in the Fiction of Mishima Yukio and Oe Kenzaburo (Harvard-Yenching Institute Monograph Series, No 33) by Susan J. Napier (Harvard University Press, 1991 ISBN 0-674-26180-1)
- Deadly Dialectics: Sex, Violence, and Nihilism in the World of Yukio Mishima by Roy Starrs (University of Hawaii Press, 1994, ISBN 0-8248-1630-7 and ISBN 0-8248-1630-7)
- Rogue Messiahs: Tales of Self-Proclaimed Saviors by Colin Wilson (Mishima profiled in context of phenomenon of various "outsider" Messiah types), (Hampton Roads Publishing Company 2000 ISBN 1-57174-175-5)
- Mishima ou la vision du vide (Mishima : A Vision of the Void), essay by Marguerite Yourcenar trans. by Alberto Manguel 2001 ISBN 0-226-96532-5)
- Yukio Mishima, Terror and Postmodern Japan by Richard Appignanesi (2002, ISBN 1-84046-371-6)
- Yukio Mishima's Report to the Emperor by Richard Appignanesi (2003, ISBN 978-0-9540476-6-5)
- Keene, Donald (2003). Five Modern Japanese Novelists. New York: Columbia University Press. ISBN 0-231-12610-7.
- The Madness and Perversion of Yukio Mishima by Jerry S. Piven. (Westport, Connecticut, Praeger Publishers, 2004 ISBN 0-275-97985-7)
- Mishima's Sword – Travels in Search of a Samurai Legend by Christopher Ross (2006, ISBN 0-00-713508-4)
- Mishima Reincarnation (Mishima tensei (三島転生)) by Akitomo Ozawa (小沢章友) (Popurasha, 2007, ISBN 978-4-591-09590-4) – A story in which the spirit of Mishima, who died at the Ichigaya chutonchi, floating and looks back on his life.
- Biografia Ilustrada de Mishima by Mario Bellatin (Argentina, Editorian Entropia, 2009, ISBN 978-987-24797-6-3)
- Impossible (Fukano (不可能)) by Hisaki Matsuura (Kodansha, 2011, ISBN 978-4-06-217028-4) – A novel that assumed that Mishima has been survived the Mishima Incident.
- Persona: A Biography of Yukio Mishima by Naoki Inose with Hiroaki Sato (Berkeley, California, Stone Bridge Press, 2012, ISBN 978-1-61172-008-2)
- Yukio Mishima (Critical Lives) by Damian Flanagan (Reaktion Books, 2014, ISBN 978-1-78023-345-1)
- Portrait of the Author as a Historian by Alexander Lee – an analysis of the central political and social threads in Mishima's novels (pages 54–55 "History Today" April 2017)
- Mishima, Aesthetic Terrorist: An Intellectual Portrait by Andrew Rankin (University of Hawaii Press, 2018, ISBN 0-8248-7374-2)
- Exquisite Nothingness: The Novels of Yukio Mishima by David Vernon (Endellion Press, 2025, ISBN 978-1739136130)

=== Film and TV ===
- Mishima: A Life in Four Chapters (1985), a film directed by Paul Schrader
- The Strange Case of Yukio Mishima (1985) BBC documentary directed by Michael Macintyre
- Yukio Mishima: Samurai Writer, a BBC documentary on Yukio Mishima, directed by Michael Macintyre, (1985, VHS ISBN 978-1-4213-6981-5, DVD ISBN 978-1-4213-6982-2)
- Miyabi: Yukio Mishima (みやび 三島由紀夫) (2005), a documentary film directed by Chiyoko Tanaka
- 11:25 The Day He Chose His Own Fate (2012), a film directed by Kōji Wakamatsu
- Mishima Yukio vs. Zenkyōtō of Tokyo University: the Truth revealed in the 50th year (三島由紀夫vs東大全共闘〜50年目の真実〜) (2020), a documentary film directed by Keisuke Toyoshima (豊島圭介)

=== Music ===
- Harakiri, by Péter Eötvös (1973). An opera based on the Japanese translation of István Bálint's poetry Harakiri that inspired by Mishima's hara-kiri. This work is included in Ryoko Aoki (青木涼子)'s album Noh x Contemporary Music (能×現代音楽) in June 2014.
- String Quartet No.3, "Mishima", by Philip Glass. A reworking of parts of his soundtrack for the film Mishima: A Life in Four Chapters, it has a duration of 18 minutes.
- Sonatas for Yukio – C.P.E. Bach: Harpsichord Sonatas, by Jocelyne Cuiller (2011). A program composed of Bach sonatas for each scene of the novel "Spring Snow".

=== Songs ===
- Patriotism (憂国, Yūkoku) lyrics by Yoshio Kodama, composition by Masao Koga, singing by Hisao Itō (伊藤久男) (1971)
- Curry rice (カレーライス, Karē raisu) lyrics/composition and singing by Kenji Endo (遠藤賢司) (1971)
- "Death and Night and Blood (Yukio)", a song by the Stranglers from the Black and White album (1978). (Death and Night and Blood is the phrase from Mishima's novel Confessions of a Mask)
- "Forbidden Colours", a song on Merry Christmas, Mr. Lawrence soundtrack by Ryuichi Sakamoto with lyrics by David Sylvian (1983). Inspired by Mishima's novel Forbidden Colors.
- "Kendo for Yukio Mishima", Japanese bonus track on the album The Rose Has Teeth in the Mouth of a Beast by American electronic duo Matmos. (2006)

=== Theatre ===
- Yukio Mishima, a play by Adam Darius and Kazimir Kolesnik, first performed at Holloway Prison, London, in 1991, and later in Finland, Slovenia and Portugal.
- M, a ballet spectacle work homage to Mishima by Maurice Béjart in 1993

=== Manga and games ===
- Yuuyake Banchō Volume 15 "Both literary and martial arts" (文武両道, bunbu ryōdō) written by Ikki Kajiwara and Illustrated by Toshio Shōji (荘司としお) (1971)
- Shin Megami Tensei by Atlus (1992) – A character Gotou who started a coup in Ichigaya, modeled on Mishima.
- Tekken by Namco (1994) – Mishima surname comes from Yukio Mishima, and a main character, Kazuya Mishima, had his way of thinking based on Mishima.
- Ghost in the Shell: Stand Alone Complex 2nd GIG (攻殻機動隊 S.A.C. 2nd GIG, Kokaku Kidōtai S.A.C. 2nd GIG) (2004, Production I.G)
- Jakomo Fosukari (Jakomo Fosukari (ジャコモ・フォスカリ)) by Mari Yamazaki (2012) – The characters modeled on Mishima and Kōbō Abe appears in.
- Persona 5 (2016) - A character named after Mishima, named Yuki Mishima, appears. He works to support the main characters from the sidelines and eventually resolves to write a documentary about them.

=== Poetry ===
- Harakiri, by István Bálint.
- 3 Tanka poems, Grave of Mishima (ユキオ・ミシマの墓, Mishima Yukio no haka) written by Pierre Pascal (1970)
  - and 12 Haiku poems. Appendix of Shinsho Hanayama (花山信勝)'s book Discovering Peace: A Record of Life and Death in Sugamo (平和の発見―巣鴨の生と死の記録, Heiwa no Hakken: Sugamo no Sei to Shi no Kiroku) translated into French.
- The Ritual of Love and Death (Patriotism) (愛と死の儀式（憂国）, Ai to Shi no gishiki (Yūkoku)) written by Emmanuel Rothen (1970)
- Lamentation: Yukio Mishima (哭三島由紀夫, Koku Mishima Yukio) written by Akira Asano (浅野晃) (1971)
  - described at the conclusion of the eulogy "Rainbow Gate".
- Yūkoku-ki (憂国忌) written by Shūji Terayama (1971)
- Harakiri (ハラキリ) written by Hiromi Itō (1986)
- It was noon (正午だった, Shogo datta) & Haiku written by Genki Fujii (2007)
  - Reading at the 38th "Patriotism Memorial" (憂国忌, Yūkoku-ki), 37th Anniversary of His Death.

=== Art ===
- Kou (Kou (恒)) by Junji Wakebe (分部順治) (1976) – Life-sized male bronze sculpture modeled on Mishima. The work was requested by Mishima in the fall of 1970, he went to Wakebe's atelier every Sunday. It was exhibited at the 6th Niccho Exhibition on 7 April 1976. In his will, Mishima wrote that he wanted his divided bones buried in a location with a view of Mount Fuji and the ocean, and that he wanted this bronze statue to be placed there concurrently, but as of 2017, this request had not yet been fulfilled.
- Season of fiery fire / Requiem for someone: Number 1, Mishima (Rekka no kisetsu/Nanimonoka eno rekuiemu: Sono ichi Mishima (烈火の季節／なにものかへのレクイエム・その壱 ミシマ)) and Classroom of beauty, listen quietly: bi-class, be quiet (Bi no kyositsu, seicho seyo (美の教室、清聴せよ)) by Yasumasa Morimura (2006, 2007) – Disguise performance as Mishima
- Objectglass 12 and The Death of a Man (Otoko no shi (男の死)) by Kimiski Ishizuka (石塚公昭) (2007, 2011) – Mishima dolls

== See also ==
- Hachinoki kai – a chat circle to which Mishima belonged.
- Japan Business Federation attack – an incident in 1977 involving four persons (including one former Tatenokai member) connected by the Mishima Incident.
- Kosaburo Eto – Mishima states that he was impressed with the seriousness of Eto's self-immolation, "the most intense criticism of politics as a dream or art."
- Kumo no kai – a literary movement group presided over by Kunio Kishida in 1950–1954, to which Mishima belonged.
- Manjirō Hiraoka – Mishima's grand-uncle. Sadatarō Hiraoka's older brother. He was a lawyer and politician.
- Mishima Yukio Prize – a literary award established in September 1987.
- Phaedo – the book Mishima had been reading in his later years.
- Suegen – a traditional authentic Japanese style restaurant in Shinbashi that is known as the last dining place for Mishima and four Tatenokai members (Masakatsu Morita, Hiroyasu Koga, Masahiro Ogawa, Masayoshi Koga).

== Major works ==
=== Literature ===
Japanese title	English title	Year (first appeared)	English translator	Year (English translation)	ISBN
花ざかりの森; Hanazakari no Mori; (short story)	"Forest in Full Bloom"	1941	Andrew Rankin	2000	
サーカス; Sākasu; (short story)	"The Circus"	1948	Andrew Rankin	1999	
盗賊; Tōzoku	Thieves	1947–1948			
假面の告白; （仮面の告白; Kamen no Kokuhaku	Confessions of a Mask	1949	Meredith Weatherby	1958	0-8112-0118-X
愛の渇き; Ai no Kawaki	Thirst for Love	1950	Alfred H. Marks	1969	4-10-105003-1
純白の夜; Junpaku no Yoru	Pure White Nights	1950			
青の時代; Ao no Jidai	The Age of Blue	1950			
禁色; Kinjiki	Forbidden Colors	1951–1953	Alfred H. Marks	1968–1974	0-375-70516-3
真夏の死; Manatsu no shi; (short story)	Death in Midsummer	1952	Edward G. Seidensticker	1956	
潮騒; Shiosai	The Sound of Waves	1954	Meredith Weatherby	1956	0-679-75268-4
詩を書く少年; Shi o Kaku Shōnen; (short story)	"The Boy Who Wrote Poetry"	1954	Ian H. Levy (Hideo Levy)	1977	
沈める滝; Shizumeru Taki	The Sunken Waterfall	1955			
金閣寺; Kinkaku-ji	The Temple of the Golden Pavilion	1956	Ivan Morris	1959	0-679-75270-6
鹿鳴館; Rokumeikan; (play)	Rokumeikan	1956	Hiroaki Sato	2002	0-231-12633-6
鏡子の家; Kyōko no Ie	Kyoko's House	1959			
宴のあと; Utage no Ato	After the Banquet	1960	Donald Keene	1963	0-399-50486-9
スタア; "Sutā" (novella)	Star (novella)	1960	Sam Bett	2019	978-0-8112-2842-8
憂國（憂国）; Yūkoku; (short story)	"Patriotism"	1961	Geoffrey W. Sargent	1966	0-8112-1312-9
黒蜥蜴; Kuro Tokage; (play)	The Black Lizard	1961	Mark Oshima	2007	1-929280-43-2
獣の戯れ; Kemono no Tawamure	The Frolic of the Beasts	1961	Andrew Clare	2018	978-0-525-43415-3
美しい星; Utsukushii Hoshi	Beautiful Star	1962	Stephen Dodd	2022	978-0-241-54556-0 (paperback); 978-0-141-99258-7 (ebook)
肉体の学校; Nikutai no Gakkō	The School of Flesh	1963			
午後の曳航; Gogo no Eikō	The Sailor Who Fell from Grace with the Sea	1963	John Nathan	1965	0-679-75015-0
絹と明察; Kinu to Meisatsu	Silk and Insight	1964	Hiroaki Sato	1998	0-7656-0299-7
三熊野詣; Mikumano Mōde; (short story)	"Acts of Worship"	1965	John Bester	1995	0-87011-824-2
孔雀; Kujaku; (short story)	"The Peacocks"	1965	Andrew Rankin	1999	1-86092-029-2
サド侯爵夫人; Sado Kōshaku Fujin; (play)	Madame de Sade	1965	Donald Keene	1967	1-86092-029-2
英霊の聲; Eirei no Koe; (short story)	"Voices of the Fallen Heroes"	1966	Paul McCarthy	2025	978-0-593-80435-3
朱雀家の滅亡; Suzaku-ke no Metsubō; (play)	The Decline and Fall of The Suzaku	1967	Hiroaki Sato	2002	0-231-12633-6
命売ります; Inochi Urimasu	Life for Sale	1968	Stephen Dodd	2019	978-0-241-33314-3
わが友ヒットラー; Waga Tomo Hittorā; (play)	My Friend Hitler and Other Plays	1968	Hiroaki Sato	2002	0-231-12633-6
癩王のテラス; Raiō no Terasu; (play)	The Terrace of the Leper King	1969	Hiroaki Sato	2002	0-231-12633-6
豐饒の海; （豊饒の海）; Hōjō no Umi	The Sea of Fertility tetralogy:	1965–1971			0-677-14960-3
I. 春の雪Haru no Yuki	1. Spring Snow	1965–1967	Michael Gallagher	1972	0-394-44239-3
II. 奔馬Honba	2. Runaway Horses	1967–1968	Michael Gallagher	1973	0-394-46618-7
III. 曉の寺Akatsuki no Tera	3. The Temple of Dawn	1968–1970	E. Dale Saunders and Cecilia S. Seigle	1973	0-394-46614-4
IV. 天人五衰Tennin Gosui	4. The Decay of the Angel	1970–1971	Edward Seidensticker	1974	0-394-46613-6

=== Critical essays ===
Japanese title	English title	Year (first appeared)	English translation, year	ISBN
アポロの杯; Aporo no Sakazuki	The Cup of Apollo	1952		
不道徳教育講座; Fudōtoku Kyōiku Kōza	Lectures on Immoral Education	1958–1959		
私の遍歴時代; Watashi no Henreki Jidai	My Wandering Years	1963		
太陽と鐡; （太陽と鉄）; Taiyō to Tetsu	Sun and Steel	1965–1968	John Bester	4-7700-2903-9
葉隠入門; Hagakure Nyūmon	On Hagakure: The Samurai Ethic and Modern Japan	1967	Kathryn Sparling, 1977	0-465-09089-3
文化防衛論; Bunka Bōei-ron	On the Defense of Culture	1968		
革命哲学としての陽明学; Kakumei tetsugaku toshiteno Yomegaku	Wang Yangming Thought; as Revolutionary Philosophy	1970	Harris I. Martin, 1971	

=== Plays for classical Japanese theatre ===
In addition to contemporary-style plays such as Madame de Sade, Mishima wrote for two of the three genres of classical Japanese theatre: Noh and Kabuki (as a proud Tokyoite, he would not attend the Bunraku puppet theatre, always associated with Osaka and the provinces).

Although Mishima took themes, titles, and characters from the Noh canon, his twists and modern settings, such as hospitals and ballrooms, startled audiences accustomed to the long-settled originals.

Donald Keene translated Five Modern Noh Plays (Tuttle, 1981; ISBN 0-8048-1380-9). Most others remain untranslated and so lack an "official" English title; in such cases it is therefore preferable to use the rōmaji title.

Year (first appeared)	Japanese title	English title	Genre
1950	邯鄲; Kantan	The Magic Pillow	Noh
1951	綾の鼓; Aya no Tsuzumi	The Damask Drum	Noh
1952	卒塔婆小町; Sotoba Komachi	Komachi at the Gravepost	Noh
1954	葵の上; Aoi no Ue	The Lady Aoi	Noh
1954	鰯賣戀曳網; (鰯売恋曳網); Iwashi Uri Koi Hikiami	The Sardine Seller's Net of Love	Kabuki
1955	班女; Hanjo	The Waiting Lady with the Fan	Noh
1955	芙蓉露大内実記; Fuyō no Tsuyu Ōuchi Jikki	The Blush on the White Hibiscus Blossom: Lady Fuyo and the True Account of the Ōuchi Clan	Kabuki
1957	道成寺; Dōjōji	Dōjōji Temple	Noh
1959	熊野; Yuya	Yuya	Noh
1960	弱法師; Yoroboshi	The Blind Young Man	Noh
1969	椿説弓張月; Chinsetsu Yumiharizuki	A Wonder Tale: The Moonbow or Half Moon (like a Bow and arrow setting up): The Adventures of Tametomo	Kabuki

=== Films ===
Mishima starred in multiple films. Patriotism was written and funded by himself, and he directed it in close cooperation with Masaki Domoto. Mishima also wrote a detailed account of the whole process, in which the particulars regarding costume, shooting expenses and the film's reception are delved into. Patriotism won the second prize at the Tours International Short Film Festival in January 1966.

Year	Title	United States release title(s)	Character	Director
1951	純白の夜; Jumpaku no Yoru	Unreleased in the U.S.	an extra (dance party scene)	Hideo Ōba
1959	不道徳教育講座; Fudōtoku Kyōikukōza	Unreleased in the U.S.	himself as navigator	Katsumi Nishikawa
1960	からっ風野郎; Karakkaze Yarō	Afraid to Die	Takeo Asahina; (main character)	Yasuzo Masumura
1966	憂国; Yūkoku	The Rite of Love and Death; Patriotism	Shinji Takeyama; (main character)	Yukio Mishima, Domoto Masaki (sub)
1968	黒蜥蜴; Kurotokage	Black Lizard	Human Statue	Kinji Fukasaku
1969	人斬り; Hitokiri	Tenchu!	Tanaka Shinbei	Hideo Gosha

== Sources ==
- Mishima, Yukio (2003). 決定版 三島由紀夫全集 第26巻 評論1 [Definitive Edition - Yukio Mishima Complete Works No.26 - Criticisms 1] (in Japanese). Shinchosha. ISBN 978-4-10-642566-0.
- Mishima, Yukio (2003). 決定版 三島由紀夫全集 第27巻 評論2 [Definitive Edition - Yukio Mishima Complete Works No.27 - Criticisms 2] (in Japanese). Shinchosha. ISBN 978-4-10-642567-7.
- Mishima, Yukio (2003). 決定版 三島由紀夫全集 第28巻 評論3 [Definitive Edition - Yukio Mishima Complete Works No.28 - Criticisms 3] (in Japanese). Shinchosha. ISBN 978-4-10-642568-4.
- Mishima, Yukio (2003). 決定版 三島由紀夫全集 第29巻 評論4 [Definitive Edition - Yukio Mishima Complete Works No.29 - Criticisms 4] (in Japanese). Shinchosha. ISBN 978-4-10-642569-1.
- Mishima, Yukio (2003). 決定版 三島由紀夫全集 第30巻 評論5 [Definitive Edition - Yukio Mishima Complete Works No.30 - Criticisms 5] (in Japanese). Shinchosha. ISBN 978-4-10-642570-7.
- Mishima, Yukio (2003). 決定版 三島由紀夫全集 第31巻 評論6 [Definitive Edition - Yukio Mishima Complete Works No.31 - Criticisms 6] (in Japanese). Shinchosha. ISBN 978-4-10-642571-4.
- Mishima, Yukio (2003). 決定版 三島由紀夫全集 第32巻 評論7 [Definitive Edition - Yukio Mishima Complete Works No.32 - Criticisms 7] (in Japanese). Shinchosha. ISBN 978-4-10-642572-1.
- Mishima, Yukio (2003). 決定版 三島由紀夫全集 第33巻 評論8 [Definitive Edition - Yukio Mishima Complete Works No.33 - Criticisms 8] (in Japanese). Shinchosha. ISBN 978-4-10-642573-8.
- Mishima, Yukio (2003). 決定版 三島由紀夫全集 第34巻 評論9 [Definitive Edition - Yukio Mishima Complete Works No.34 - Criticisms 9] (in Japanese). Shinchosha. ISBN 978-4-10-642574-5.
- Mishima, Yukio (2003). 決定版 三島由紀夫全集 第35巻 評論10 [Definitive Edition - Yukio Mishima Complete Works No.35 - Criticisms 10] (in Japanese). Shinchosha. ISBN 978-4-10-642575-2.
- Mishima, Yukio (2003). 決定版 三島由紀夫全集 第36巻 評論11 [Definitive Edition - Yukio Mishima Complete Works No.36 - Criticisms 11] (in Japanese). Shinchosha. ISBN 978-4-10-642576-9.
- Mishima, Yukio (2004). 決定版 三島由紀夫全集 第37巻 詩歌 [Definitive Edition - Yukio Mishima Complete Works No.37 - Poetry] (in Japanese). Shinchosha. ISBN 978-4-10-642577-6.
- Mishima, Yukio (2004). 決定版 三島由紀夫全集 第38巻 書簡 [Definitive Edition - Yukio Mishima Complete Works No.38 - Letters] (in Japanese). Shinchosha. ISBN 978-4-10-642578-3.
- Mishima, Yukio (2004). 決定版 三島由紀夫全集 第39巻 対談1 [Definitive Edition - Yukio Mishima Complete Works No.39 - Dialogues 1] (in Japanese). Shinchosha. ISBN 978-4-10-642579-0.
- Mishima, Yukio (2004). 決定版 三島由紀夫全集 第40巻 対談2 [Definitive Edition - Yukio Mishima Complete Works No.40 - Dialogues 2] (in Japanese). Shinchosha. ISBN 978-4-10-642580-6.
- Mishima, Yukio (2004). 決定版 三島由紀夫全集 第41巻 音声(CD) [Definitive Edition - Yukio Mishima Complete Works No.41 - Voices (CD)] (in Japanese). Shinchosha. ISBN 978-4-10-642581-3.
- Satō, Hideaki; Inoue, Takashi; Yamanaka, Takeshi, eds. (2005). 決定版 三島由紀夫全集 第42巻 年譜・書誌 [Definitive Edition - Yukio Mishima Complete Works No.42 - Biographical Sketch and Bibliography] (in Japanese). Shinchosha. ISBN 978-4-10-642582-0.
- Mishima, Yukio (2005). 決定版 三島由紀夫全集 補巻 補遺・索引 [Definitive Edition - Yukio Mishima Complete Works Supplementary Volume - Addenda, Indexes] (in Japanese). Shinchosha. ISBN 978-4-10-642583-7.
- Mishima, Yukio (2006). 決定版 三島由紀夫全集 別巻 映画「憂国」(DVD) [Definitive Edition - Yukio Mishima Complete Works Separate Volume - Movie "Patriotism" (DVD)] (in Japanese). Shinchosha. ISBN 978-4-10-642584-4.
- Mishima, Yukio (2005) [1st pub. 1966]. 英霊の聲 オリジナル版 [Voices of the Fallen Heroes - Original Version]. Kawade Bunko (in Japanese) (Paperback ed.). Kawade Shobō Shinsha. ISBN 978-4-309-40771-5.
- Mishima, Yukio (2010) [1st pub. Shinchosha:1956]. 幸福号出帆 [The S.S. Happiness Sets Sail]. Kadokawa Bunko (in Japanese) (Paperback ed.). Kadokawa Shoten. ISBN 978-4-04-121216-5.
- 新文芸読本 三島由紀夫 [New Literary Reader: Yukio Mishima] (in Japanese). Kawade Shobō Shinsha. 1990. ISBN 978-4-309-70155-4.
- 近代作家追悼文集成〈42〉三島由紀夫 [Collection of Memorial Texts for Modern Writers 42: Yukio Mishima] (in Japanese). Yumani Shobo. 1999. ISBN 978-4-89714-645-4.
- Agata, Mitsunori; others (2025). 殉国の行動者 三島由紀夫 [Martyr to the Country: Yukio Mishima] (in Japanese). Asia Shimbunsha. ISBN 978-4-9911961-3-3.
- Akiyama, Shun; others (1990). 三島由紀夫 [Yukio Mishima]. Gunzo - Japanese Authors 18 (in Japanese). Shogakukan. ISBN 978-4-09-567018-8.
- Andō, Takeshi (1996). 三島由紀夫「日録」 ["Daily Record" of Yukio Mishima] (in Japanese). Michitani. ISBN 978-4-915841-39-2.
- Andō, Takeshi (1998). 三島由紀夫の生涯 [The Life of Yukio Mishima] (in Japanese). Natsume Shobo. ISBN 978-4-931391-39-0.
- Date, Munekatsu (1972). 裁判記録「三島由紀夫事件」 [Judicial Record of the "Mishima Incident"] (in Japanese). Kodansha. NCID BN0140450X.
- Etsugu, Tomoko (1983). 三島由紀夫 文学の軌跡 [Yukio Mishima: Trajectory of His Literature] (in Japanese). Kōronsha. NCID BN00378721.
- Fukushima, Jirō (1998). 三島由紀夫―剣と寒紅 [Yukio Mishima: Sword and Winter Red] (in Japanese). Bungeishunjū. ISBN 978-4-16-317630-7. an out-of-print book for copyright violation
- Fukushima, Jurō (2005) [1st pub. Shinjinbutu Ōraisha:1975]. 再訂資料・三島由紀夫 [Re-Edition Document - Yukio Mishima] (in Japanese) (Enlarged ed.). Chobunsha. ISBN 978-4-88695-180-9.
- Hasegawa, Izumi; Takeda, Katsuhiko, eds. (1976). 三島由紀夫事典 [Encyclopedia of Yukio Mishima] (in Japanese). Meiji Shoin. ISBN 978-4-625-40025-4. NCID BN01686605.
- Hijiya-Kirschnereit, Irmela, ed. (2010). MISHIMA!―三島由紀夫の知的ルーツと国際的インパクト [MISHIMA!: The Intellectual Roots of Yukio Mishima and the International Impact] (in Japanese). Shōwado. ISBN 978-4-8122-1064-2.
- Hirano, Keiichiro (2023). 三島由紀夫論 [An Essay on Yukio Mishima] (in Japanese). Shinchosha. ISBN 978-4-10-426010-2.
- Hiraoka, Azusa (1996) [1st pub. 1972]. 伜・三島由紀夫 [My Son - Yukio Mishima]. Bunshu Bunko (in Japanese) (Paperback ed.). Bungeishunjū. ISBN 978-4-16-716204-7.
- Honda, Shōgo (2005) [1st pub. Shinchosha:1960]. 物語 戦後文学史（上） [Story: Postwar Literary History]. Iwanami Gendai Bunko Literature 91 (in Japanese). Vol. 1. Iwanami Shoten. ISBN 978-4-00-602091-0.
- Honda, Shōgo (2005) [1st pub. Shinchosha:1962]. 物語 戦後文学史（中） [Story: Postwar Literary History]. Iwanami Gendai Bunko Literature 92 (in Japanese). Vol. 2. Iwanami Shoten. ISBN 978-4-00-602092-7.
- Hosaka, Masayasu (2001) [1st pub. Kodansha:1980]. 三島由紀夫と楯の会事件 [Yukio Mishima and the Tatenokai Incident]. Kadokawa Bunko (in Japanese) (Enlarged/Revised ed.). Kadokawa Shoten. ISBN 978-4-04-355602-1.
- Inose, Naoki; Satō, Hiroaki (2012). Persona: A Biography of Yukio Mishima. Berkeley, California: Stone Bridge Press. ISBN 978-1-61172-008-2.
- Inose, Naoki (1999) [1st pub. 1995]. ペルソナ―三島由紀夫伝 [Persona: A Biography of Yukio Mishima]. Bunshun Bunko (in Japanese) (Paperback ed.). Bungeishunjū. ISBN 978-4-16-743109-9.
- Inoue, Takashi (2010). 三島由紀夫 幻の遺作を読む―もう一つの『豊饒の海』 [Reading a Never-before-published Phantom Posthumous Work of Yukio Mishima: Another "The Sea of Fertility"]. Kobunsha Shinsho (in Japanese). Kobunsha. ISBN 978-4-334-03594-5.
- Isoda, Kōichi, ed. (1983). 新潮日本文学アルバム20 三島由紀夫 [Yukio Mishima]. Shincho Japanese literature Album No.20 (in Japanese). Shinchosha. ISBN 978-4-10-620620-7.
- Itagaki, Shin; Fukuda, Kiyoto (2016) [1st pub. 1969]. 川端康成―人と作品 [Yasunari Kawabata - The Man and His Works]. Century Books - Men and Works 20 (in Japanese) (New Binding ed.). Shimizu Shoin. ISBN 978-4-389-40109-2.
- Itasaka, Gō (1998). 真説・三島由紀夫―謎の原郷 [A True Theory on Yukio Mishima: Mysterious Urheimat] (in Japanese). Natsume Shobo. ISBN 978-4-931391-44-4.
- Itasaka, Gō; Suzuki, Kunio (2010). 三島由紀夫と一九七〇年 [Yukio Mishima and 1970] (in Japanese). Rokusaisha. ISBN 978-4-8463-0772-1.
- Itō, Katsuhiko (2006). 最後のロマンティーク 三島由紀夫 [The Last Romantic: Yukio Mishima] (in Japanese). Shinyōsha. ISBN 978-4-7885-0981-8.
- Iwashita, Hisafumi (2008). 見出された恋 「金閣寺」への船出 [A Love Found: Sailing into "The Temple of the Golden Pavilion"] (in Japanese). Yūzankaku. ISBN 978-4-639-02024-0.
- Iwashita, Hisafumi (2011). ヒタメン―三島由紀夫が女に逢う時… [The Face with No Mask: When Yukio Mishima Meet with His Woman…] (in Japanese). Yūzankaku. ISBN 978-4-639-02197-1.
  - Iwashita, Hisafumi (2016) [1st pub. Yūzankaku:2011]. 直面（ヒタメン）―三島由紀夫の若き日の恋 [The Face with No Mask (Hitamen): Yukio Mishima's Love in His Youth]. Bunshun Bunko (in Japanese) (Paperback ed.). Bungeishunjū. ISBN 978-4-16-790735-8.
- Kapur, Nick (2018). Japan at the Crossroads: Conflict and Compromise after Anpo. Cambridge, Massachusetts: Harvard University Press. ISBN 978-0-674-98850-7. ISBN 978-0-674-98848-4.
- Kawabata, Yasunari (1980). 川端康成全集 第10巻 小説10 [Yasunari Kawabata Complete Works No.10 - Novels 10] (in Japanese). Shinchosha. ISBN 978-4-10-643810-3.
- Kawashima, Masaru (1996). 三島由紀夫 [Yukio Mishima] (in Japanese). Bungeishunjū. ISBN 978-4-16-351280-8.
- Keene, Donald (2012) [1st pub. 1992]. 日本文学史―近代・現代篇（六） [History of Japanese Literature: Modern/Contemporary pieces No.6] (in Japanese). Translated by Tokuoka, Takao; Kakuchi, Yukio (Paperback ed.). Chuokoron-Shinsha. ISBN 978-4-12-205647-3.
- Kimura, Tokuzō (1995). 文芸編集者の戦中戦後 [Wartime and Postwar of A Literary Editor] (in Japanese). Ōzorasha. ISBN 978-4-7568-0007-7.
- Komatsu, Kazuo (1991). 日本ファシズムと「国家改造」論 [Japanese Fascism and the Theories of "National Reform"] (in Japanese). Sekai Shoin. NCID BN0625039X.
- Komuro, Naoki (1985). 三島由紀夫が復活する [Yukio Mishima will be Resurrected] (in Japanese). Mainichi Communications. NCID BN10913162.
- Matsumoto, Tōru (1990). 三島由紀夫 年表作家読本 [Yukio Mishima: Author's Chronological Reader] (in Japanese). Kawade Shobō Shinsha. ISBN 978-4-309-70052-6.
- Matsumoto, Tōru; Satō, Hideaki; Inoue, Takashi, eds. (2000). 三島由紀夫事典 [Encyclopedia of Yukio Mishima] (in Japanese). Bensei Shuppan. ISBN 978-4-585-06018-5.
- Matsumoto, Tōru, ed. (2010). 別冊太陽 日本のこころ175―三島由紀夫 [Separate Volume Taiyo - Hearts of Japan 175: Yukio Mishima] (in Japanese). Heibonsha. ISBN 978-4-582-92175-5.
- Mitani, Makoto (1999) [1st pub. Kasama Shoin:1985 (an out-of-print book)]. 級友 三島由紀夫 [My Classmate: Yukio Mishima]. Chuko Bunko (in Japanese) (Reprinted ed.). Chuokoron-Shinsha. ISBN 978-4-12-203557-7.
- Miyazaki, Masahiro (1999). 三島由紀夫「以後」―日本が日本でなくなる日 ["After" Yukio Mishima: The Day When Japan is No Longer Japan] (in Japanese). Namiki Shobo. ISBN 978-4-89063-112-4.
- Miyoshi, Yukio, ed. (1989). 三島由紀夫必携 [Yukio Mishima Must-Have] (in Japanese). Gakutōsha. ISBN 978-4-312-00522-9.
- Mochimaru, Hiroshi; Satō, Matsuo (2010). 証言 三島由紀夫・福田恆存 たった一度の対決 [Testimonies: The Only Once Confrontation between Yukio Mishima and Tsuneari Fukuda] (in Japanese). Bungeishunjū. ISBN 978-4-16-373250-3.
- Morita, Masakatsu (2002) [1st pub. 1971]. わが思想と行動―遺稿集 [My Thoughts and Actions: His Posthumous Manuscripts] (in Japanese) (New Format ed.). Nisshin Hōdō. ISBN 978-4-8174-0528-9.
- Murakami, Takeo (2010). 君たちには分からない―「楯の會」で見た三島由紀夫 [You Guys don't Understand: Yukio Mishima that I Saw in "Tatenokai"] (in Japanese). Shinchosha. ISBN 978-4-10-327851-1.
- Muramatsu, Takeshi (1990). 三島由紀夫の世界 [The World of Yukio Mishima] (in Japanese). Shinchosha. ISBN 978-4-10-321402-1.
- Murata, Haruki (2015). 三島由紀夫が生きた時代―楯の会と森田必勝 [The Period when Yukio Mishima was Alive: The Tatenokai and Masakatsu Morita] (in Japanese). Seirindo. ISBN 978-4-7926-0532-2.
- Nagawa, Yumiko (2023). 手記 三島由紀夫様 私は森田必勝の恋人でした [Notes: To Mr. Yukio Mishima, I was Masakatsu Morita's Girlfriend] (in Japanese). Shumei University Shuppan-kai. ISBN 978-4-915855-47-4. Her maiden name is Shibata.
- Nakamura, Akihiko (2015) [1st pub. Bungeishunjū:2000]. 三島事件 もう一人の主役―烈士と呼ばれた森田必勝 [Another Protagonist of the Mishima Incident: Masakatsu Morita who Called an Upright Man] (in Japanese) (Enlarged ed.). WAC inc. ISBN 978-4-89831-729-7.
- Nathan, John (1974). Mishima: A Biography. Boston/Toronto: Little, Brown and Company. ISBN 978-0-316-59844-6.
- Nathan, John (2000) [1st pub. 1976 (an out-of-print book)]. 新版 三島由紀夫─ある評伝 [New edition - Mishima: A Biography] (in Japanese). Translated by Noguchi, Takehiko (New/Revised ed.). Shinchosha. ISBN 978-4-10-505702-2.
- Nishi, Hōtaro (2017). 死の貌―三島由紀夫の真実 [The Appearance of Death: The Truth about Yukio Mishima] (in Japanese). Ronsōsha. ISBN 978-4-8460-1669-2.
- Nishi, Hōtaro (2020). 三島由紀夫事件 50年目の証言―警察と自衛隊は何を知っていたか [Yukio Mishima Incident - Testimonies of 50 Years Later: What did the Police and the Self-Defense Forces Know] (in Japanese). Shinchosha. ISBN 978-4-10-353581-2.
- Nosaka, Akiyuki (1991) [1st pub. 1987]. 赫奕たる逆光―私説・三島由紀夫 [Brilliant Backlight: A Personal Opinion about Yukio Mishima]. Bunshun Bunko (in Japanese) (Paperback ed.). Bungeishunjū. ISBN 978-4-16-711912-6.
- Okayama, Norihiro (2014). 三島由紀夫外伝 [The Side Story of Yukio Mishima] (in Japanese). Sairyusha. ISBN 978-4-7791-7022-5.
- Okuno, Takeo (2000) [1st pub. 1993]. 三島由紀夫伝説 [Legend of Yukio Mishima]. Shincho Bunko (in Japanese) (Revised/Paperback ed.). Shincho. ISBN 978-4-10-135602-0.
- Religious Thought Research Society, ed. (1972). 日本人の生死観 [Japanese Views on Life and Death] (in Japanese). Daizō Shuppan. NCID BN05030434.
- Satō, Hideaki; Inoue, Takashi; Matsumoto, Tōru, eds. (2006). 三島由紀夫と映画〈三島由紀夫研究2〉 [Yukio Mishima and Movies]. Research of Yukio Mishima 2 (in Japanese). Kanae Shobo. ISBN 978-4-907846-43-5.
- Satō, Hideaki; Inoue, Takashi; Matsumoto, Tōru, eds. (2008). 三島由紀夫 金閣寺 〈三島由紀夫研究6〉 [Yukio Mishima, The Temple of the Golden Pavilion]. Research of Yukio Mishima 6 (in Japanese). Kanae Shobo. ISBN 978-4-907846-58-9.
- Satō, Hideaki; Yamanaka, Takeshi; Matsumoto, Tōru, eds. (2024). 三島由紀夫のエンターテインメント〈三島由紀夫研究24〉 [Yukio Mishima's Entertainment]. Research of Yukio Mishima 24 (in Japanese). Kanae Shobo. ISBN 978-4-907282-97-4.
- Satō, Hideaki; Yamanaka, Takeshi; Matsumoto, Tōru, eds. (2011). 同時代の証言 三島由紀夫 [Testimonies of the Contemporaries: Yukio Mishima] (in Japanese). Kanae Shobo. ISBN 978-4-907846-77-0.
- Scott-Stokes, Henry (2000). The Life and Death of Yukio Mishima (Enlarged/Revised ed.). New York City: Cooper Square Press. ISBN 978-0-8154-1074-4.
- Scott-Stokes, Henry (1985). 三島由紀夫─死と真実 [The Life and Death of Yukio Mishima] (in Japanese). Translated by Tokuoka, Takao. Diamond, Inc. ISBN 978-4-478-94056-3.
  - Scott-Stokes, Henry (1998). 三島由紀夫─生と死 [The Life and Death of Yukio Mishima] (in Japanese). Translated by Tokuoka, Takao (Enlarged/Revised ed.). Seiryu Publ. ISBN 978-4-916028-52-5.
- Scott-Stokes, Henry; Kase, Hideaki (2012). なぜアメリカは、対日戦争を仕掛けたのか [Reason Why America Set a Trap of the War against Japan]. Shodensha Shinsho (in Japanese). Translated by Fujita, Hiroyuki. Shodensha. ISBN 978-4-396-11287-5.
- Seikai, Ken (1992). 三島由紀夫とニーチェ―悲劇的文化とイロニー [Yukio Mishima and Nietzsche: Tragic Culture and Irony] (in Japanese). Seikyūsha. ISBN 978-4-7872-9066-3.
- Seikai, Ken (2000). 三島由紀夫の帰還―青海健評論集 [The Return of Yukio Mishima: Ken Seikai's Criticism Collection] (in Japanese). Ozawa Shoten. ISBN 978-4-7551-0393-3.
- Setouchi, Jakucho; Miwa, Akihiro (2003). ぴんぽんぱん ふたり話 [Pin-pon-pan: Chatting of Two] (in Japanese). Shueisha. ISBN 978-4-08-775295-3.
- Shibata, Shōji (2012). 三島由紀夫 作品に隠された自決への道 [Yukio Mishima: The Path to Suicide Hidden in His Works] (in Japanese). Shodensha. ISBN 978-4-396-11300-1.
- Shiine, Yamato (2012) [1st pub. 2007]. 完全版 平凡パンチの三島由紀夫 [Complete Version: Yukio Mishima from Heibon Punch] (in Japanese) (Enlarged ed.). Matsurikasha (Kawade Shobō Shinsha). ISBN 978-4-309-90963-9.
- Shimauchi, Keiji (2010). 三島由紀夫―豊饒の海へ注ぐ [Yukio Mishima: Flows into The Sea of Fertility]. Minerva Japan Biography Selection (in Japanese). Minerva Shobo. ISBN 978-4-623-05912-6.
- Sugiyama, Takao (2007). 「兵士」になれなかった三島由紀夫 [Yukio Mishima, who could not Become a "Soldier"]. Soldier Series (in Japanese). Shogakukan. ISBN 978-4-09-379773-3.
- Suzuki, Ayumi; Tamura, Tsukasa (supervisor) (2005). 火群のゆくへ―元楯の会会員たちの心の軌跡 [Whereabouts of the Flames: The Trajectories of Their Hearts who once Belonged to the Tatenokai] (in Japanese). Hakurosha. ISBN 978-4-434-07066-2.
- Takemoto, Tadao (1998) [1st pub. 1981]. パリ憂国忌―三島由紀夫VSヨーロッパ [Paris Yūkoku-ki: Yukio Mishima VS Europe] (in Japanese) (3rd ed.). Nippon Kyobunsha. ISBN 978-4-531-06116-7.
- Tekina, Osamu (2015). ミシマの警告―保守を偽装するB層の害毒 [Mishima's Warnings: The Poison of the B-class Disguised as Conservative] (in Japanese). Kodansha. ISBN 978-4-06-272784-6.
- Toda, Yoshio; Nagafuji, Takeshi (1978). よみがえる三島由紀夫―霊の人の文学と武と [Yukio Mishima Resurrected: The Person of Spirit, His Literature and Martial Arts] (in Japanese). Nippon Kyobunnsha. ISBN 978-4531060924. NCID BN09146011.
- Tokuoka, Takao (1999) [1st pub. 1996]. 五衰の人―三島由紀夫私記 [The Man of the Decay of the Angel: Private Notes about Yukio Mishima] (in Japanese) (Paperback ed.). Bungeishunjū. ISBN 978-4-16-744903-2.
- Vernon, David (2025). 極上の空：三島由紀夫の小説 [Exquisite Nothingness: The Novels of Yukio Mishima] (in Japanese). Endellion Press. ISBN 978-1739136130. NCID BN10688248.
- Yamamoto, Kiyokatsu (1980). 三島由紀夫・憂悶の祖国防衛賦―市ケ谷決起への道程と真相 [Yukio Mishima - An Anguish Verse of Fatherland Defense: The Path to the Ichigaya Uprising and the Truth] (in Japanese). Nihon Bungeisha. ISBN 978-4-537-00517-2. NCID BN10688248.
- Yamamoto, Kiyokatsu (2001). 自衛隊「影の部隊」―三島由紀夫を殺した真実の告白 [Japan Self-Defense Forces "A Unit of Shadow": Confession of a Truth that Killed Yukio Mishima] (in Japanese). Kodansha. ISBN 978-4-06-210781-5.
- Yamauchi, Yukito (2014). 三島由紀夫の肉体 [Yukio Mishima's Body] (in Japanese). Kawade Shobō Shinsha. ISBN 978-4-309-02318-2.
- Yuasa, Atsuko (1984). ロイと鏡子 [Roy & Kyoko] (in Japanese). Chuoukoronsha. ISBN 978-4-12-001276-1. Atsuko Yuasa (湯浅あつ子) was an old friend of Mishima, and her house was model of Kyōko no Ie (鏡子の家; "Kyōko no Ie"). Her husband was Japanese TV personality Roy James (ロイ・ジェームス).
- 新潮 1月・臨時増刊 三島由紀夫読本 [Shinchō – January Extra Special Issue: Yukio Mishima Reader] (in Japanese). Shinchosha. 1971. ASIN B00QRZ32NO.
- ユリイカ 特集 攻殻機動隊 STAND ALONE COMPLEX [Eureka - Special Feature: Ghost in the Shell STAND ALONE COMPLEX] (in Japanese). Seidosha. 2005. ISBN 978-4-7917-0139-1.
- 月刊日本2008年1月号 [Monthly Nippon - January 2008 Issue] (in Japanese). Vol. 12. K&K Press. 2008. ASIN B001190EIW.
