= Kyōko no Ie =

1959 novel by Yukio Mishima

First edition (Japanese)

Kyōko no Ie (鏡子の家) ("Kyoko's House") is a 1959 novel by the Japanese writer Yukio Mishima.

The book tells the interconnected stories of four young men who represent different facets of the author's personality. His athletic side appears as a boxer, his artistic side as a painter, his narcissistic, performing side as an actor and his secretive, nihilistic side as a businessman who goes through the motions of living a normal life while practising "absolute contempt for reality".

Mishima's biographer and translator, John Nathan, has called Kyōko no Ie "an unsettling, even a terrifying book", at least partly because it seems prophetic in its anticipation of developments in Mishima's own life: the boxer takes up right-wing politics and the actor becomes involved in a sado-masochistic sexual relationship which ends in double suicide for himself and his lover.

The story of Osamu, the actor in Kyōko no Ie, was one of three Mishima works adapted by Paul Schrader for his film Mishima: A Life in Four Chapters. Although the novel has not been translated into English, Schrader used it because his original choice, Forbidden Colors, was vetoed by Mishima's widow.
