= Sun and Steel (essay) =

1968 essay by Yukio Mishima

- Cover of the first edition
- Author: Yukio Mishima
- Original title: 太陽と鉄; Taiyō to Tetsu
- Language: Japanese
- Genre: Essay
- Publisher: Kodansha
- Publication date: 1968
- Publication place: Japan

Sun and Steel: Art, Action and Ritual Death (Japanese: 太陽と鉄, Hepburn: Taiyō to Tetsu) is an autobiographical essay by Yukio Mishima detailing his artistic relationship to his body. Meditating on his transformative experiences with bodybuilding and martial arts training, Mishima considers their impact on his creative practice and concludes that literature, in its ideal form, is inextricable from physical exertion.

First published in 1965 by Hihyō, a magazine founded by Takeshi Maramatsu, the essay was published in book form by Kodansha in 1968. An English translation by John Bester followed in 1970, less than a year before the author's death. In 1972, the American fiction writer Hortense Calisher billed the book as "a classic of self-revelation" and Mishima as "a mind of the utmost subtlety, broadly educated". Calisher wrote, "To paraphrase him in words not his, [...] is to try to build a china pagoda with a peck of nails. [...] only the frivolous will not empathize with what is going on here; this is a being for whom life—and death too—must be exigeant."
