= Forbidden Colors =

1951 novel by Yukio Mishima

- First edition cover
- Author: Yukio Mishima
- Original title: Kinjiki (禁色)
- Translator: Alfred H. Marks
- Language: Japanese
- Publisher: Alfred A. Knopf (US Eng. trans)
- Publication date: 1951 (Part 1), 1953 (Part 2)
- Publication place: Japan
- English publication date: 1968
- Media type: Print (hardback & paperback)
- Pages: 403 p. (US hardback edition)
- ISBN: 0-436-28153-8 (US hardback edition)
- OCLC: 629740

Forbidden Colors (禁色, Kinjiki) is a 1951 novel by Japanese writer Yukio Mishima, translated into English in 1968. A sequel titled Higyō (秘楽; "Secret Pleasure") was published in 1953. The name kinjiki is a euphemism for same-sex love. The kanji 禁 means "forbidden", and 色 in this case means "erotic love", although it can also mean "color". The word kinjiki also means colors that were forbidden to be worn by people of various ranks in the Japanese court. It describes the marriage of a gay man to a young woman. Like Mishima's earlier novel Confessions of a Mask, it is generally considered somewhat autobiographical.

== Plot summary ==
Aging, cynical Shunsuke is one of postwar Japan's most respected authors. While vacationing at an exclusive Japanese resort, he meets Yuichi, a stunningly gorgeous young man of limited means and intellect who is engaged to a prim, conventional young woman from a very well-to-do family. While he needs the marriage for financial reasons, Yuichi innocently confides to the older man that he feels no real physical desire for his bride, or for any woman. The crafty Shunsuke senses an opportunity to mold the malleable, gullible young man into an exquisite weapon of revenge against the female sex as a whole. He tells Yuichi that his inability to feel desire for women is not a weakness but potentially a tremendous source of strength. He advises the young man to go through with the marriage and gain financial security, but also to omit no opportunity to experiment with the emotions of others, and to have as many affairs as possible with both women and men. As Yuichi enters the gay underworld of postwar Japan and forms relationships with women whom Shunsuke is seeking revenge against, he and Shunsuke become increasingly divided while remaining conspirators.

== Themes ==
There are many elements Mishima touches on. Two involving the main characters, Yuichi and Shunsuke, are:

- Same-sex love: Yuichi's open and unashamed nature is a driving force of the narrative. Shunsuke's contempt for women leads him to admire Yuichi, who, he feels, is incapable of loving women.
- Misogyny: Shunsuke's contempt for women drives his behavior to use Yuichi as a tool of his revenge.

The most basic thematic element is the clash of opposites:

- Beauty and Ugliness: Yuichi is considered the pinnacle of beauty, while Shunsuke considers himself to be extremely ugly.
- Youth and Aging: The young and old are played against each other. The youthful Yuichi and elderly Shunsuke are at odds, though they are conspirators. The young Kyoko and the mature Mrs. Kaburagi are played against each other for Yuichi's affection.
- Life and Death: Shunsuke is obsessed with death and feels it is more powerful than life.

== Reception ==
Hortense Calisher said the book had a poor reception in the west, but also argued that Mishima "is never limited enough to treat of sex alone."

== Adaptations ==
The first butoh piece was an adaptation of Kinjiki by Tatsumi Hijikata, which premiered in 1959.

The title of the novel was used by David Sylvian and Ryuichi Sakamoto as the name of their theme song for the film soundtrack of Merry Christmas Mr Lawrence, a film set in a Japanese POW camp in Java which includes exploration of homoerotic themes.

== Critical Reading ==
- Vernon, David (2025). Exquisite Nothingness: The Novels of Yukio Mishima. Edinburgh: Endellion Press. ISBN 978-1739136130. Chapter Three: 'Forbidden Colors: Fifty Shades of Gay', pp. 101–122
