= The Decay of the Angel =

Novel by Yukio Mishima

- First edition (Japanese)
- Author: Yukio Mishima
- Original title: Tennin Gosui (Five Death Omens of an Angel) (天人五衰)
- Translator: Edward Seidensticker
- Language: Japanese
- Series: The Sea of Fertility
- Publisher: Shinchosha (orig.) & Alfred A. Knopf (Eng. trans.)
- Publication date: 25 February 1971
- Publication place: Japan
- Media type: Print (hardcover, paperback)
- Pages: 271p
- ISBN: 1-135-14469-9 (Eng. trans. first edition, hardback)
- Preceded by: The Temple of Dawn

The Decay of the Angel (天人五衰, Tennin Gosui) is a novel by Yukio Mishima and is the fourth and last in his Sea of Fertility tetralogy. It was published in Shinchosha (orig.) on 25 February 1971, three months after Yukio Mishima's suicide.

== Explanation of the title ==
In Buddhist scriptures, Devas (天部 tenbu) are mortal angels. The five signs of the decay of an angel are:

1. The flowery crown withers,
2. Sweat pours from the armpits,
3. The robe is soiled,
4. It loses self-awareness, or become dissatisfied with its lotus seat, and
5. The body becomes fetid or ceases to give off light, or the eyelids tremble.

Tōru, whose purity lies only in his malicious self-satisfaction, is a degenerate parody of the idealised Kiyoaki.

== Plot ==
In The Decay of the Angel, the last book of Sea of Fertility tetralogy, Shikeguni Honda, a retired judge, adopts a teenage orphan, Tōru Yasunaga, whom he believes to be a dead schoolfriend's third successive reincarnation. In this book, which is also accepted as the testament of Yukio Mishima, Shigekuni Honda observes the evolution of Japan in the 20th century. Japan's progressive losing traditional values and westernization in both individual and social levels, which started in Spring Snow, appears as a new, universalized Japan in the last book. In Spring Snow, Kiyoaki's faithful friend and a young lawyer candidate, a judge in the Runaway Horses, and a philosopher in The Temple of the Dawn, Shigekuni Honda is presented as an old man, a retired judge in the book of The Decay of the Angel. Throughout the previous three books, Honda, who tried to protect Kiyoaki himself and his reincarnations from death, fails each time, and this book deals with a final incarnation, Toru. After turning in the final manuscript for The Decay of the Angel in 1970, writer Yukio Mishima attempted to stage a coup and died by ritual suicide.

=== Honda finds Tōru (ch. 1-10) ===
The novel opens on Saturday, 2 May 1970, with a seascape off the coast of the Izu Peninsula. Tōru Yasunaga is an orphaned 16-year-old boy working in Shimizu as a signalman, identifying ships by telescope and notifying the offices at Shimizu harbour. He works a 24-hour shift every third day, from an observation tower on the Komagoe shore, built on top of a strawberry farmer's water tank. Honda, walking along the shoreline, notices it in passing.

Later, that night, Tōru is visited at his post by his friend Kinue, a mad girl who believes that she is incredibly beautiful and that all men are after her. Kinue tells him a long story about how a boy molested her on the bus. After midnight, at his house in Hongō, Honda dreams about angels flying over the Miho Pine Grove, which he had visited that day.

At 9am, Tōru's shift ends and he takes the bus home to his apartment. He has a bath, and we see that he has the same three moles as Kiyoaki. In Chapter 7, it is explained that Honda's wife Rie has died and that Keiko, a happily single lesbian, has become a platonic companion for him. They have gone travelling together to Europe, and hold canasta parties. Honda is preoccupied with his dream life and with the past, and has trouble with his housekeeper and maids. In her old age, Keiko is devoted to the study of Japanese culture, but her knowledge is second-hand and superficial, and Honda calls it a "freezer full of vegetables".

They visit the Miho Pine Grove, a tourist-trap Honda already saw and disliked. They have their picture taken, sticking their heads through holes in a board painted to make them look like Jirōchō and his wife Ōchō, who were bosses of Shimizu Harbour in the 19th century. They see the giant dying pine, where, according to Zeami's Robe of Feathers, an angel supposedly left her robe, and had to dance for the fisherman who stole it in order to get it back. They also go to Mio Shrine.

On the drive back home, they stop at the signal station Honda saw several days ago. He is strangely drawn to it, and they go inside to look around. Because Tōru is only wearing an undershirt, Honda sees the moles on his side. Back in the car Honda announces his intention to adopt the boy.

=== The adoption (ch. 11-20) ===
In Keiko's hotel room on Nihondaira, Honda explains to her the significance of the moles and tells her the whole story of Kiyoaki's two previous reincarnations. She reluctantly accepts this story. Honda makes her promise to tell no-one, especially not Tōru. On 10 August, Tōru becomes aware that he is being investigated by detectives through a story of Kinue's, and later that month he is visited at home by the superintendent, who announces Honda's intention to adopt. In Chapter 16, the extent of Honda's wealth is revealed; through prudently investing the fortune he came into after the war, he has become a millionaire.

By October, Tōru has moved to the house in Hongō and is receiving lessons in table manners and other social skills. Honda is eager to protect him from premature death and tries to inculcate the cynicism that Kiyoaki, Isao and Ying Chan lacked. Three tutors are employed for Tōru. In late November the literature tutor, Furusawa, takes him to a local coffee-house and tells him a political parable about the nature of suicide and authority. Tōru suddenly feels dislike for him and engineers his dismissal. Relishing the feeling of power this gives him, he casts around for a more amusing victim.

=== Momoko (ch. 21-25) ===
In late spring of 1972, two friends of Honda try to arrange a marriage between Tōru and their daughter, Momoko Hamanaka. After dinner, Momoko shows Tōru photo-albums in her room and he makes up his mind to hurt her. The two families go on holiday to Shimoda; it is there that Honda realises that Tōru is secretly hostile to Momoko.

As the demure relationship progresses, Tōru analyses Momoko and, while talking to her in the Kōrakuen Garden a year or so after their first meeting, he decides to make her jealous by acquiring a second girlfriend. At a go-go hall on his way home from school, he picks up a 25-year-old who calls herself "Nagisa" (Miss Brink) and they have sex a few days later. Nagisa gives him a medallion with her monogram on it. Momoko does not notice it until they go swimming together, and she gives the "N" an innocuous interpretation. It is only when Nagisa approaches Tōru in the coffee-house that her jealousy is aroused.

Momoko throws the medallion into a canal and insists that Tōru must leave Nagisa. Tōru claims that he cannot do it alone, and dictates a letter for Momoko to send to Nagisa. In the letter, Momoko is made to lie that her family is in financial difficulties and that she needs to marry Tōru for his money. Momoko hopes to inspire guilt in Nagisa. After the letter is delivered, Tōru goes to Nagisa's apartment, snatches it from her, and takes it to Honda. The marriage is off.

Several months later, in early October 1973, Honda and Tōru visit Yokohama, and at the harbourside have a conversation. Tōru realises that Honda has guessed that the letter was fake, and that he takes satisfaction in the guile his adopted son displays. Tōru is furious at being seen through so easily, and throws his diary into the water. At the end of 1973 he finishes school, and is accepted into university.

=== The end (ch. 26-30) ===
In the spring of 1974, Tōru enters his majority and drops all pretences. He becomes violent with Honda and intimidates him into getting his way on everything, moving Kinue into a hut at the bottom of the garden, spending money freely and abusing the maids. On 3 September 1974, Honda is caught spying on couples in the park, and the incident makes the newspapers; Tōru moves to have him declared senile.

On 20 December, Tōru goes to a Christmas party at Keiko's. To his amazement, he is the only guest. Keiko reveals Honda's true motivations for adopting him, and cheerfully explains that if he does not die in 1975, he must be a fraud. Tōru returns home and demands Kiyoaki's dream diary. On 28 December, Tōru burns the diary and tries to commit suicide by drinking methanol, but it only blinds him, and he survives. Honda discovers that Keiko has betrayed him, and he breaks off contact with her. Tōru loses all motivation and spends his days with Kinue in her cottage. Honda eventually concludes that Tōru was not, in fact, Kiyoaki's reincarnation.

At about this time, Honda is afflicted by pains which he does nothing about for months. On 22 July 1975, just before a hospital appointment, Honda goes to Gesshū Temple for the first time since February 1914. Satoko, who is now the Abbess, admits him, but during their conversation he mentions Kiyoaki, and she claims that she never knew anyone of that name. Baffled and desolate, Honda replies "Perhaps then there has been no I." In the final scene of the book, Honda strolls through the temple garden at Satoko's invitation, a place that "had no memories, nothing".

== Characters ==
Major characters

- Shigekuni Honda (1895–1975)
- Keiko Hisamatsu
- Tōru Yasunaga (b. March 20, 1954)
- Kinue, an insane girl (b. 1949)
- Furusawa, one of Tōru's three tutors
- Shigehisa and Taeko Hamanaka
- Momoko Hamanaka, their daughter
- Nagisa, a woman Tōru plays against Momoko
- Tsune, a maid hired by Tōru
- The Abbess of the Gesshuji, formerly Ayakura Satoko (b. 1893)

Minor characters

- Two White Russian women, a retired businessman and a teacher of flower-arranging
- An old man who stabs a woman in the park and the interviewing policeman
- A fellow voyeur
- A shipping superintendent
- Nuns of the Gesshū Convent, and a steward

== Major themes ==
Some biographers consider Tōru and Honda to be the author's self-portraits.

- The decadence of modernity
- The emptiness of old age
- Calculation versus spontaneous action
- Ivory towers
- Innocent ardency + excellence = beauty
- The inescapably physical nature of the concept of beauty
- Admiration of "men of action" as a sublimated voyeurism
- Suicide as the annihilation of a hated world
- Suicide as a way of "establishing" oneself (Furusawa's anecdote in ch.18 of the mouse who drowns itself in a laundry tub so that the cat cannot eat it)
- The vastness of the Buddhist universe
- Nothingness, nihilism
- Loss of memory

== Reception ==
Richard T. Kelly of The Guardian criticized The Decay of the Angel as having a rushed quality but also said that the conclusion "does much to redeem" this.

== References to other works ==
- Ichijō Kanera (1402-1481), a courtier, synthesised Confucianism, Buddhism and Shintoism. He is mentioned only in chapter 2 in relation to the legend behind Hagoromo. He is from the 15th century, not the 14th, as given in the translation.
- Hagoromo ("The Feather Mantle"), a Noh play by Zeami Motokiyo
- The "Numerical Sayings" or Ekottara-āgama (Anguttara Nikaya), part of the Sutta Pitaka ("basket of threads/dialogues") in the Tripitaka. Divided into 11 sections, it deals with things of which there are only 1, 2, 3... 11 examples.
- The Life of the Buddha (not identified)
- The (Mahā)māyā sūtra (摩耶經, T12b:383 in the Taishō Tripitaka) about Maya Devi, the mother of Sakyamuni (the Buddha)
- The Abhidharma-mahāvibhāsā-sāstra, a commentary on the Jñāna-prasthana ("Establishment of Knowledge"), which has eight sections dealing with, respectively, miscellaneous topics, the fetters, knowledge, intentional acts, the four material elements, the controlling faculties, meditation, and views. (source)
- The Kitano Scroll in the Kitano Shrine, Kyoto
- Tōru names his favourite painter as Andrea Mantegna

== References to actual history ==
- Jirōchō of Shimizu (1820–1893) was the "Tōkaidō's No.1 boss". This larger-than-life figure is the subject of many legends; among other accomplishments, he essentially created Shimizu Harbour. Ōchō (d. 1859) was his wife. Keiko's ignorance of Jirōchō is rather surprising.
- The Miho Pine Grove, in Nihondaira
- 10 August 1970: the Zengakuren demonstrate after industrial waste contaminates beaches
- Shimizu-ku, Shizuoka (from which Mount Fuji is visible; Mount Udo overlooks the harbour from the west)
- Shimoda, a city and port in Shizuoka
- Honda lives in Hongō, near the University of Tokyo
- The gardens of the Meiji Shrine in Shibuya, Tokyo (ch.24)
- The Koishikawa Kōrakuen Garden of the Mito Tokugawa family, in Tokyo (ch.18,24)

== Notes ==
- The book, serialised in the monthly magazine Shincho, was begun in nineteen seventy after Mishima had resolved on suicide. It was probably finished by August, when he showed the manuscript to Donald Keene while holidaying in Shimoda.
- Until shortly after World War II, Japanese people usually reckoned age by number of different years lived in rather than by birthdays. In Decay of the Angel, age is definitely being reckoned using birthdays.
- The Decay of the Angel was translated into Mandarin Chinese and written in Simplified Chinese.
