= The Temple of Dawn =

1970 novel by Yukio Mishima

- First edition (Japanese)
- Author: Yukio Mishima
- Original title: Akatsuki no tera (暁の寺)
- Translator: E. Dale Saunders & Cecilia Segawa Seigle
- Language: Japanese
- Series: The Sea of Fertility
- Publisher: Shinchosha (orig.) & Alfred A. Knopf (Eng. trans.)
- Publication date: 1970
- Publication place: Japan
- English publication date: Oct 1973
- Media type: Print (hardback & paperback)
- ISBN: 0-394-46614-4 (Eng. trans. first edition, hardback)
- OCLC: 628303
- Dewey Decimal: 895.6/3/5
- LC Class: PZ3.M6878 Se vol. 3 PL833.I7
- Preceded by: Runaway Horses
- Followed by: The Decay of the Angel

The Temple of Dawn (暁の寺, Akatsuki no tera) is the third novel in the Sea of Fertility tetralogy by the Japanese writer Yukio Mishima. For this as for the other novels in the series, Mishima travelled to various places to conduct research, including Wat Arun in Bangkok, Thailand.

== Plot ==
The lawyer Honda visits Thailand on a business trip and encounters a young girl whom he believes to be his schoolfriend's second reincarnation. Eleven years later she travels to Japan to study and he befriends her in the hope of learning more. The main narrative takes place between 1941 and 1952. The last chapter is set in 1967.

=== Part one (1941–5) ===
In 1941, Shigekuni Honda is sent to Bangkok as legal counsel for Itsui Products in a case involving a spoilt shipment of antipyretic drugs. He takes advantage of the trip to see as much as he can of Thailand.

After touring many great buildings, he visits the Temple of Dawn and is deeply impressed by its sumptuous architecture, which to the sober lawyer represents "golden listlessness", the luxurious feel of anti-rationalism and of "the constant evasion of any organized logical system". Mentioning to his translator, Hishikawa, that he went to school with two Siamese princes (Pattanadid, a younger brother of Rama VI, and his cousin Kridsada, a grandson of Rama IV—both in Lausanne with their uncle Rama VIII), a short meeting is arranged with Pattanadid's seven-year-old daughter, Princess Chantrapa (Ying Chan), who claims to be the reincarnation of a Japanese boy, much to the embarrassment of her relatives, who keep her isolated in the Rosette Palace.

Ying Chan almost immediately claims to recognise Honda, asserts that she is Isao and demands to be taken back to Japan with him. Honda questions her and satisfies himself that she is the genuine article, but is bothered at a later meeting by the absence of the three moles that helped him identify Isao.

At the conclusion of the lawsuit at the end of September, Itsui offers him a bonus in the form of a travel voucher, which he uses to travel to India. He visits Calcutta, where he sees the Durga festival; Benares, where he witnesses open-air cremation; Mogulsarai, Manmad, and finally the Ajanta caves, closely associated with Buddhism, where he sees cascades that remind him of Kiyoaki's last promise to "see him...beneath the falls". He returns to Bangkok on November 23, at a time when relations with Japan are deteriorating, and is unpleasantly affected by the crassness and ugliness of the Japanese tourists at his hotel.

A last visit to see Ying Chan at the Chakri Palace goes disastrously, when the translator lets slip that Honda is leaving for Japan without her, and Ying Chan throws a tantrum.

Almost immediately after he returns to Japan, war is declared with the United States. The atmosphere is almost festive. Honda spends all his spare time studying Buddhist philosophy and pays no attention to the war. Even when confronted by bombed-out residential districts, he feels no emotion; in fact, his studies have left him even more indifferent to the outside world than before.

At the end of May 1945, Honda encounters the former maid, Tadeshina, at the former Matsugae estate. Tadeshina reminds him about Satoko Ayakura, who is still at the Gesshu Temple to which she retired at the end of Spring Snow. (Honda has an impulse to visit Satoko but cannot obtain train tickets.) He gives Tadeshina some food, and in return she gives him a book she uses as a talisman, the Mahamayurividyarajni, or "Sutra of the Great Golden Peacock Wisdom King (or Queen)". A description of this sutra in Chapter 22 concludes Part One.

=== Part two (1952) ===
Chapter 23 introduces Keiko Hisamatsu, Honda's neighbor at his new villa at Ninooka, a summer resort in the Gotemba area. In 1947, the new Constitution resulted in the sudden resolution of a lawsuit filed in 1900, as a result of which Honda earned a 36,000,000 yen fee for a single case. He uses part of this money to buy the property, which overlooks Mount Fuji. In the same year he won the case, he rediscovered (in an antique shop owned by Prince Toin) the emerald ring that the Thai prince, Chao P., had lost at the Peers School in 1913.

At a housewarming party, two pseudo-artistic friends of Honda's are introduced: Mrs Tsubakihara, a mournful poetry student under Makiko Kito (who perjured herself for Isao's sake in Runaway Horses), and Yasushi Imanishi, a specialist in German literature who is obsessed with elaborate sadomasochistic sexual fantasies set in his imagined utopian nation, "The Land of the Pomegranate". Many other guests arrive, in scenes which represent Mishima's caricature of post-war Japan; to Honda's disappointment, Ying Chan, another invitee who is now a student in Japan, does not turn up. During the night, Honda peeks into the guest room and is shocked to see Imanishi and Tsubakihara having sex while Makiko watches. This is the first indication of Honda's voyeuristic tendencies (which are intended to be emblematic of his approach to the world).

The next day they visit the shrine of Mount Fuji; the day after, Honda learns from Keiko that Ying Chan turned up at his house a day late. Ying Chan and Honda meet for dinner at the Imperial Hotel in Tokyo; Honda returns the emerald ring. Arriving back home he finds Iinuma, the decrepit father of Isao, waiting for him. During a confessional conversation, Iinuma tells him about a suicide attempt he made in 1945 and shows him the scar. As he leaves, Honda feels sorry for him and gives him 50,000 yen in an envelope.

Honda decides to settle the question of Ying Chan's "inheritance" (the three moles on the midriff) once and for all. He tries to get Katsumi Shimura, a nephew of Keiko, to seduce Ying Chan, but he fails.

Scenes elaborating on Imanishi and Tsubakihara follow, including Imanishi's excited reaction to Communist student demonstrations in Tokyo.

Finally, Honda invites Ying Chan to a pool party at his villa. Now that Ying Chan is clad in a bathing suit, he sees no moles on her side. It is only while spying on her in the guest room that he finally sees the moles. To his amazement, she is sleeping with Keiko. His satisfaction with this ocular proof is short-lived: Imanishi falls asleep while smoking in bed and Honda's villa burns to the ground. Both Imanishi and Tsubakihara are killed, but the others in the house survive.

Honda assumes that he has saved Ying Chan (who returns to Thailand) from karmatic fate, but his hopes are dashed when he meets Ying Chan's twin sister, who informs him that Ying Chan has died of a snakebite.

== Major themes ==
The novel contains lengthy discussions of theories about reincarnation from around the world. There are sardonic accounts of Japanese society immediately before and after World War II. The nostalgic tone of the first two books has vanished, a fact that is not obvious immediately because of the main character's inward focus.

== Reception ==
Richard T. Kelly of The Guardian wrote that "The Temple of Dawn is weighed down by Mishima's frequent résumés of Honda's learning [on "theories of metempsychosis"], suggestive perhaps of an author's struggle to convince himself." He notes the "pervasive aura of desolation" that takes the reader on to the final volume, "a work of pitch-black pessimism".

== References to other works ==
- Orphicism and the associated mythology
- Pythagoreanism: theories of reincarnation
- The Questions of King Milinda
- Tommaso Campanella's Città del sole ("The City of the Sun") and Caucasian Sonnets
- Giovanni Batista Vico
- The Laws of Manu
- The Upanishads
- Treatises expounding Consciousness-only theories (Japanese: Yuishiki), by brothers Vasubandhu and Asanga
- The Mahamayurividyarajni, or "Sutra of the Great Golden Peacock Wisdom King (Queen)"
- Keiko jokingly compares the opening passage of the sutra to the song "Ciribiribin" (1898) by Alberto Pestalozza, which has been recorded many times in the 20th century with various lyrics (ch. 33)

== References to actual history ==
While the princess never existed, the Thai kings and palace buildings mentioned are all real, as are the places Honda visits in India. The bombing of Pearl Harbor and Japan's declaration of war on the United States prompts Honda's retreat into his study. The aftermath of the air-raids of May 24 and May 25, 1945 is described, and the post-war occupation figures prominently, with anti-American demonstrations in Tokyo.
