= Tennin =

Angel-like beings from Japanese Buddhism

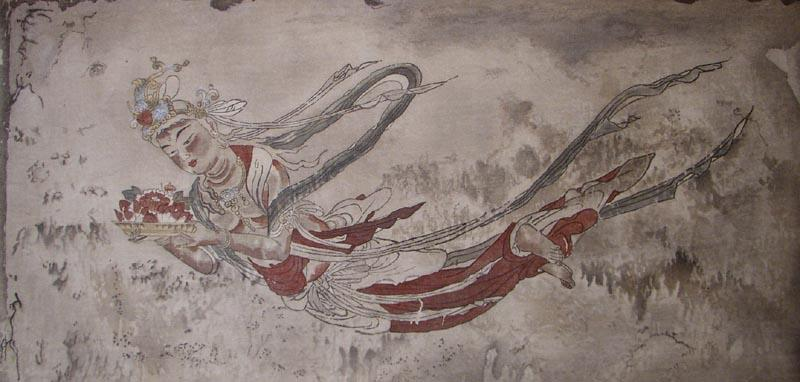
A depiction of a Tennin.

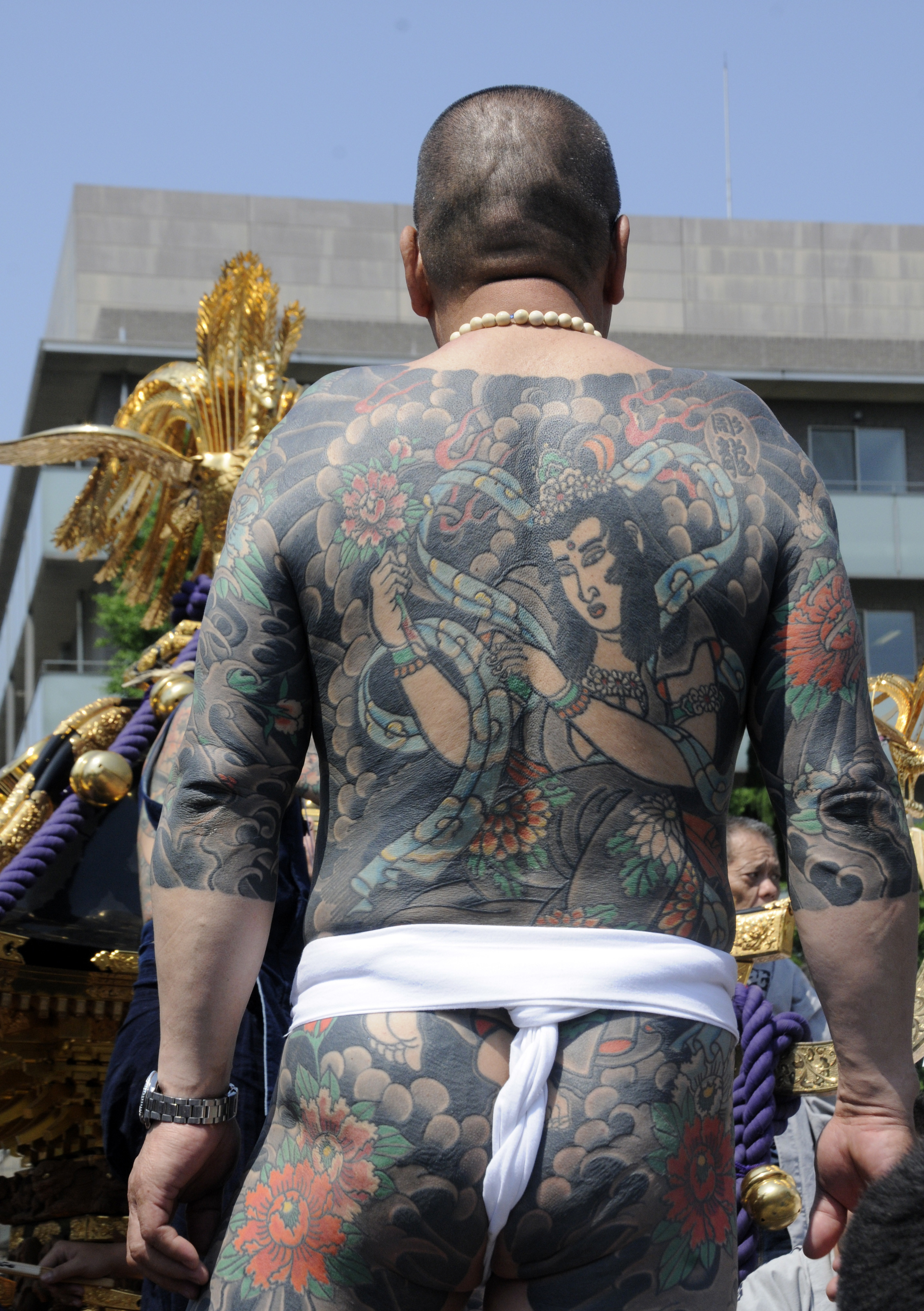
A man with an irezumi tattoo of a Tennyo.

Tennin (天人; lit. "Heaven(ly) Person"), which may include Tenshi (天使; lit. "Heaven(ly) Messenger"), Tennotsukai (天の使い; lit. "Messenger(s) of Heaven"), Hiten (飛天; lit. "Flying Heaven") and the specifically female version, the Tennyo (天女; lit. "Heaven(ly) Woman/Women"), are a divine kind of spiritual beings found in Japanese Buddhism, the equivalent of angels. They were seemingly imported from Chinese Buddhism, which was itself influenced by the concepts of heavenly beings found in Indian Buddhism and Chinese Taoism.

They originated in Hinduism as "Apsara" (Sanskrit: अप्सरा, romanized: apsaras or apsarā); a member of a class of celestial beings in Hindu and Buddhist culture. They are originally a type of female spirit of the clouds and waters, who later plays the role of a "nymph" or "fairy". They figure prominently in the sculpture, dance, literature and painting of many Indian and Southeast Asian cultures. See also Devi, Deva (Hinduism) (a divine being or god in Hinduism), Deva (Buddhism) (a higher being in Buddhism) and Deva (Jainism) (a term used for heavenly beings in Jainism).

Apsara are known as Chinese and Japanese: 天使; pinyin: Tiānshǐ; rōmaji: Tenshi or Chinese and Japanese: 天人; pinyin: Tiānrén; rōmaji: Tennin. Female Tennin are Chinese and Japanese: 天女; pinyin: Tiānnǚ; rōmaji: Tennyo and male Tiānnán are Chinese and Japanese: 天男; pinyin: Tiānnán; rōmaji: Tennan.

== History ==
Tennin are mentioned in Buddhist sutras, and these descriptions form the basis for depictions of the beings in Japanese art, sculpture, and theater. They are usually pictured as unnaturally beautiful women either topless or dressed in ornate, colourful kimono (traditionally in five colours), exquisite jewelry, and stole-like, feathered, flowing scarves – called both Chányī / Tenne (衣, lit. a "Wrapping Raiment" or "Heavenly Raiment") and Yǔyī / Hagoromo (羽衣, lit. 'Feather[ed] Raiment') – that wrap loosely around their bodies (a parallel to the Christian Halo), as-well-as Gokō (後光, lit. 'back[ground] light' or 'aureole'; an actual halo) – the Húntiānlíng/Adaitenayao (simplified Chinese: 浑天绫; traditional Chinese: 渾天綾, lit. "Armillary Sash"), worn by Nezha, from Chinese mythology, is also a kind of Chányī / Yǔyī. They usually carry lotus blossoms as a symbol of enlightenment or play musical instruments such as the biwa, or flute.

== Religion ==
Tennin (Devatās in Buddhist mythology) are believed to live in the Buddhist heaven as the companions to the Buddhas and Bodhisattvas. Devatās, or spirit beings, often have homes in nature, like trees, river bends, or stones. People believe their power can be captured in amulets, such as clothing or jewelry, to bring good luck and well-being. From the start, local Buddhist practices welcomed the worship of these spirits, which helped Buddhism spread throughout Asia.

== Powers ==
Tennin can fly, a fact generally indicated in art by their coloured or feathered kimono, called both Tenne (纏衣, lit. a "Wrapping Raiment" or "Heavenly Raiment") and Hagoromo (羽衣, lit. 'Feather[ed] Raiment'). In some legends, tennin are unable to fly without these kimono (and thus cannot return to heaven). More rarely, they are shown with feathered wings. In a Noh play Hagoromo, which bears a number of similarities to the Western swan maiden legends, tennyo come to the earth and take off their hagoromo. A fisherman spies them and hides their clothes in order to force one to marry him. After some years he tells his wife what he did, and she finds her clothes and returns to heaven. The legend says it occurred on the beach of Miho no Matsubara, now a part of the city of Shizuoka.

== See also ==
- Apsara
- Ceres, Celestial Legend
- Divine being
- Feather cloak
- InuYasha Movie 2: Castle Beyond the Looking Glass
- List of angels in theology
- Nymph
- Selkie (seal maidens)
- Swan maiden
- Valkyries
