= Enshō-ji (Nara) =

Naran Buddhist temple complex

Coordinates: 34.643728°N 135.845613°E

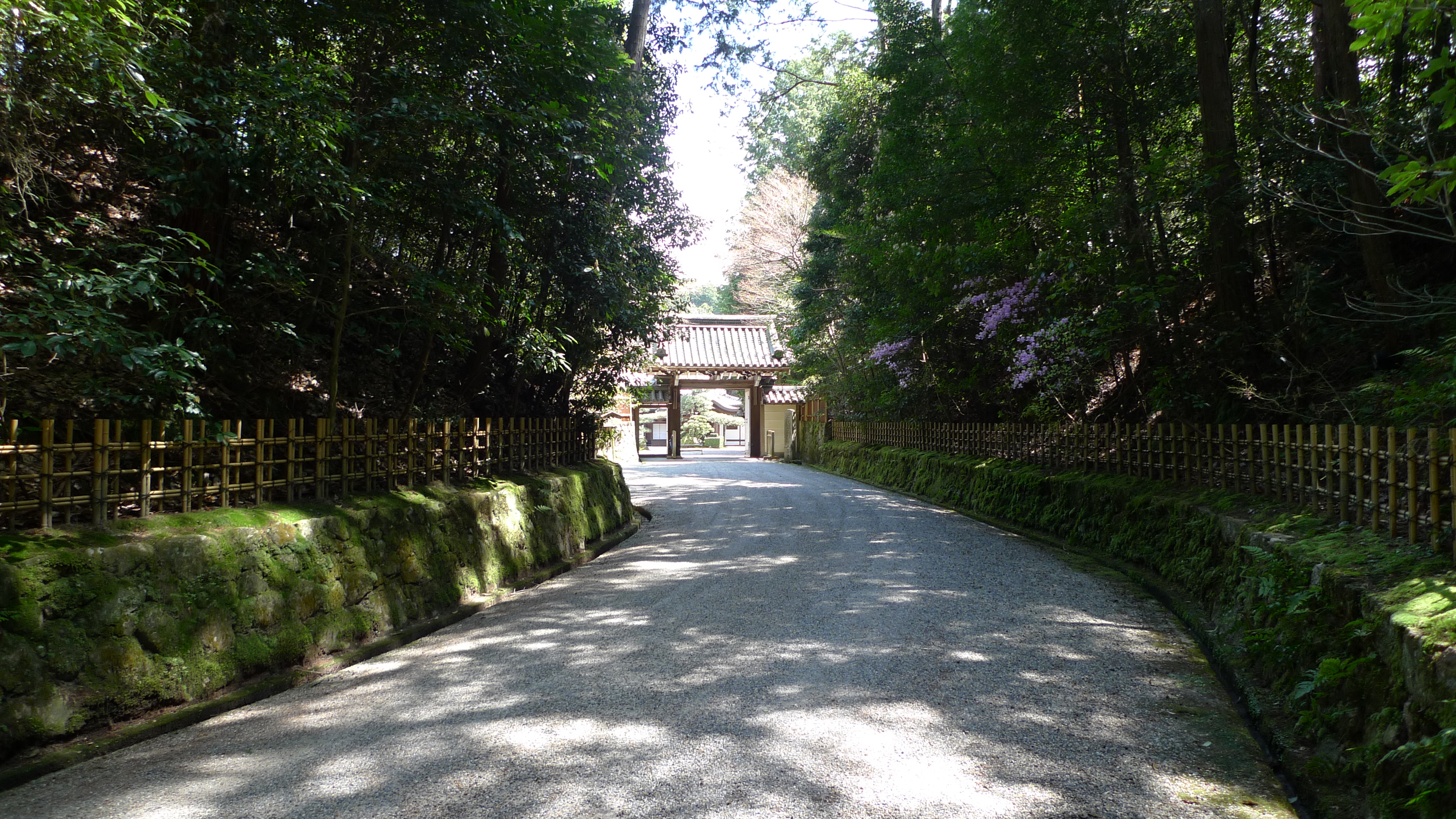
Entrance gate of Enshō-ji

Enshō-ji (圓照寺 or 円照寺), also known as Yamamura Palace (山村御殿), is a Buddhist temple complex in Nara founded by Queen Bunchi, daughter of Emperor Go-Mizunoo, in 1656. Together with Chūgū-ji and Hokke-ji, it is considered one of the Three Yamato Monzeki (大和三門跡), or imperial temples, belonging to the Myōshin-ji school of Rinzai Zen.

The temple served as model for Gesshū-ji (月修寺) in Yukio Mishima's Spring Snow and was used as one of the locations for the filming of its 2005 dramatization.

The temple is also home to the head office of the ikebana school called Yamamura Go-ryū (山村御流).

The temple is not open to the public.

== See also ==
- Daikaku-ji in Kyoto
