= Sea of Fertility =

Sea of Fertility can refer to:

- Mare Fecunditatis ('Sea of Fertility'), a region of the Moon
- The Sea of Fertility, a series of four novels by Japanese writer Yukio Mishima
