= Saioku-ji =

Buddhist temple in Japan

- 柴屋寺
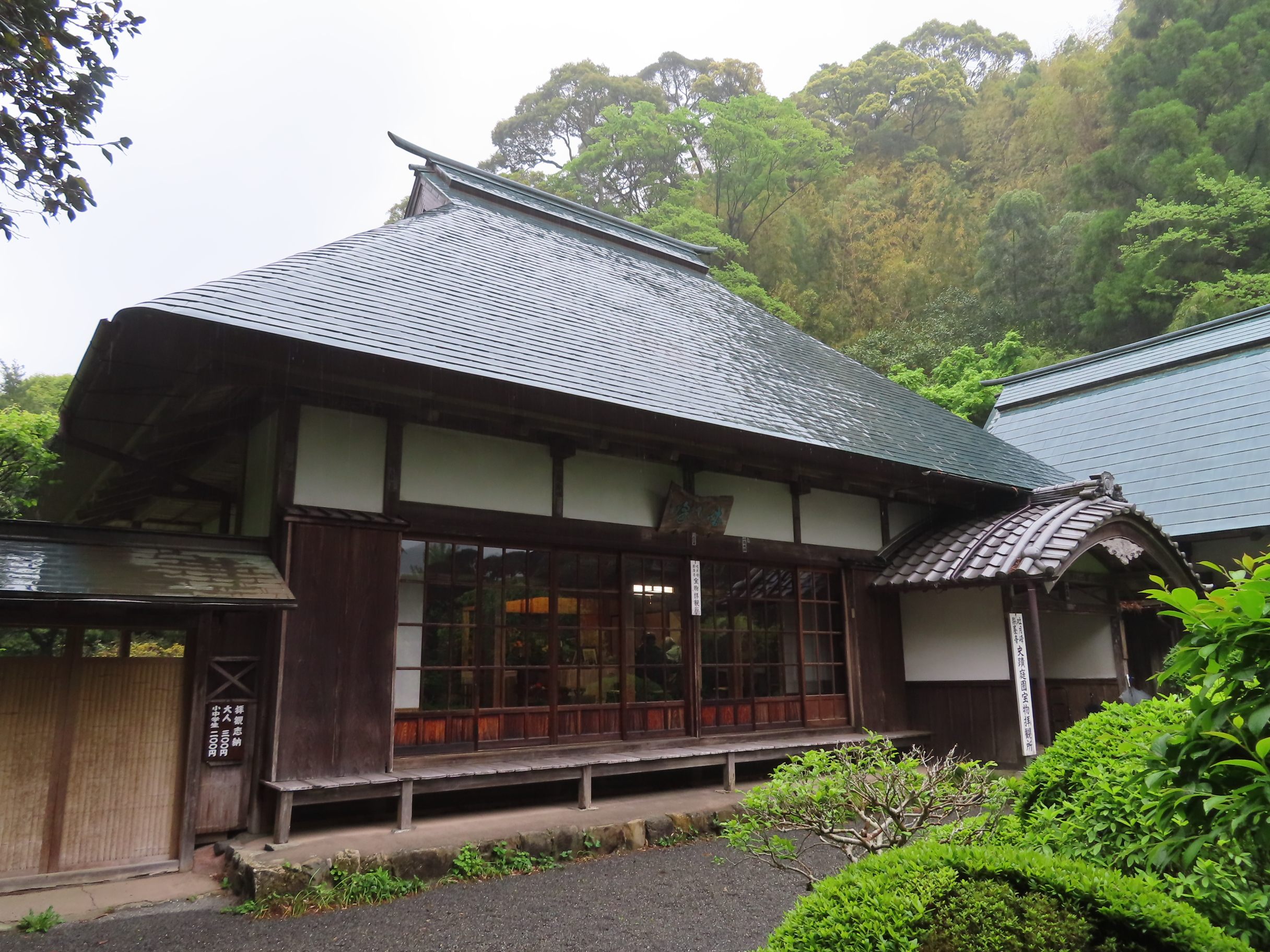

- Saioku-ji Saioku-ji (Japan)

Religion
- Affiliation: Buddhism
- Deity: Jūichimen Kannon
- Rite: Rinzai school of Japanese Zen

Location
- Location: Mariko 3316, Suruga-ku, Shizuoka-shi, Shizuoka 411-0037
- Country: Japan
- Coordinates: 34°57′19.50″N 138°20′29.69″E

Architecture
- Founder: Imagawa Ujichika
- Completed: 1504

Saioku-ji (柴屋寺) is a Buddhist temple belonging to the Myōshin-ji branch of Rinzai school of Japanese Zen located in Mariko-juku, Suruga-ku, Shizuoka, Japan. Its main image is a statue of Jūichimen Kannon. The Japanese garden at this temple was designated a National Historic Site of Japan in 1936 and National Place of Scenic Beauty, with the borders of the historical site expanded in 1970.

== History ==
Saioku-ji was founded in 1504 by Imagawa Ujichika, on the site of the hermitage of Sōchō (1448-1542), the noted renga poet and adviser to his father, Imagawa Yoshitada. After the fall of the Imagawa clan, the temple received the patronage of the Tokugawa shogunate.

The temple was nicknamed "temple of the moon" or "temple of bamboo" in literature and memorialized in haiku and other poetry by travelers on the Tōkaidō. Its Japanese garden makes use of the borrowed scenery technique, incorporating views of surrounding mountains, and is patterned after the garden of Ginkaku-ji in Kyoto. The garden includes an artificial hill with a "moon-viewing stone" on which Sōchō sat while he composed poetry. The precincts include a shoin and a chashitsu in a bamboo grove that was transplanted from Higashiyama in Kyoto.

The temple is a ten-minute walk from the "Togepposaioku" bus stop on the Shizutetsu bus from Shizuoka Station.

== See also ==
- List of Historic Sites of Japan (Shizuoka)
- List of Places of Scenic Beauty of Japan (Shizuoka)
