= Tsuru no Ongaeshi =

Japanese folklore

Tsuru no Ongaeshi (鶴の恩返し; lit. "Crane's Return of a Favor") is a story from Japanese folklore about a crane who returns a favor to a man. A variant of the story where a man marries the crane that returns the favor is known as Tsuru Nyōbō (鶴女房; "Crane Wife").

According to Japanese scholar Seki Keigo, the story is "one of the best known" tales in Japan about supernatural and enchanted spouses.

== Crane's Return of a Favor ==
A man saves a crane that had been shot down by hunters. That night, a woman appears at the man's door and tells him that she is his wife. The man tells her that he is not wealthy enough to support them, but she tells him that she has a bag of rice that will fill their stomachs. Every day, the rice never goes down in the sack, and it always stays full. The next day she tells the man that she is going in a room to make something and that he is not to come in until she is finished. Seven days have passed by and she finally comes out with a beautiful piece of clothing, but she is very skinny. She tells the man to go to the markets the next morning and to sell this for a very large price. He comes back home and tells her that he sold it for a very good price. After that, they are now wealthy. The wife then goes back into the room, telling him once again not to come in until she is finished. The man's curiosity takes over and he peeks in, realizing that the woman is the crane whom he saved. When the crane sees that the man has found out her true identity, she says that she cannot stay there anymore and flies away to never come back.

== The Crane Wife ==
In The Crane Wife story, a man marries a woman who is in fact a crane disguised as a human. To make money, the crane wife plucks her own feathers to weave silk brocade, which the man sells, but she becomes increasingly ill as she does so. When the man discovers his wife's true identity and the nature of her illness, devastated by the truth, he demands her to stop. She responds that she has been doing it for love, for them. The man says that love exists without sacrifice, but he is wrong. He who lives without sacrifice for someone else does not deserve to be with a crane.

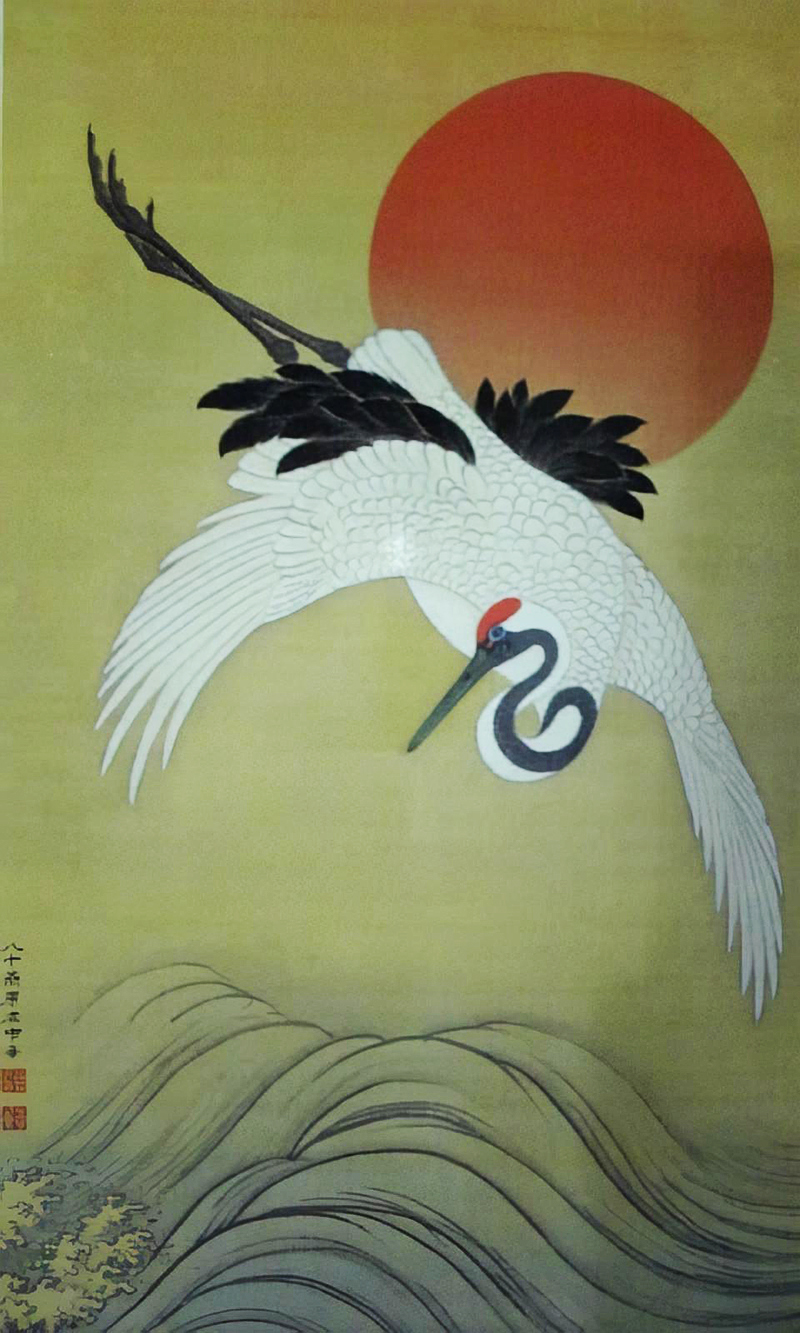
Ippontōchō-zu by Hara Zaichū

== Related variations ==
In The Copper Pheasant Wife, the wife does not weave cloth but instead provides her husband a plume to feather an arrow shaft the husband is rewarded for. The wife is not looked in on by the husband like in The Crane Wife; instead like in Crane's Return of a Favor the pheasant wife leaves as soon as the favor is returned.

In The Bird Wife, it is an injured wild goose the man saves. In this story, the wife weaves without prompting from the husband. One day she disappears, and he finds her in a local pond. It is there she explains she was trying to repay his kindness, and asks him to use the money from selling the cloth to take care of their child before flying away.

In The Fox Wife, it is a fox that the man helps and who shows up on the man's doorstep to become his bride. In this tale the fox does not weave but uses her tail to help sweep the floors. Upon discovering his wife's identity, the husband drives her away.

In The Clam Wife, a man finds a woman who mysteriously appear at his doorway. They become married, and the wife cooks the husband a delicious bean soup each day. He peeks in on her cooking, and discovers that she is urinating clam juice into the soup, so he chases her away.

In The Fish Wife, a fisherman releases fish that he does not need to eat back into the water because he does not have a greedy nature. A woman appears at the fisherman's door and begs to be his wife. The wife cooks the husband a bean soup that is so good he is suspicious of how she makes it. He spies on her while she is cooking, and discovers she urinates in the soup. Later at dinner he alludes to her cooking method. When the wife realizes he knows she says she must return to her former home, and bids the husband visit her at the pond the following day. When he does, she explains how she was the fish he saved and had wanted to repay the favor. She disappears into the water, leaving him a box of gold and silver.

In The Snake Wife, a woman appears in a widower's doorway asking to stay the night. They become married, and the wife becomes pregnant. The wife warns the husband not to look in on the hut where she intends to have their child. He looks, and discovers a snake. The wife says that as the husband has seen her true form, she must leave. She ends up giving her child her two eyeballs for nourishment as she cannot be there to feed it. When the son grows of age he takes care of his blind mother.

One theory holds that the prototype of the tale was the Tang dynasty story “Hechang Pou” (Japanese: かくしょうほう). However, stories of animals repaying kindness were ubiquitous in ancient China. The Xu Qixie Ji (《续齐谐记》) by 吴均 of the Southern Liang records a tale of a vermilion bird repaying a favor, while Tao Yuanming’s Soushen Houji (《搜神后记》) of the Eastern Jin contains the story of the “snail maiden” repaying kindness.

== See also ==
- Swan maiden
- Yuki-onna
- Hagoromo (play)
- Selkie wife
- Orpheus and Eurydice
