= Michael Gallagher (translator) =

Author and translator of Japanese literature

Michael Gallagher (born 1930) is an author and translator of Japanese literature. His translation of Yukio Mishima's Spring Snow was a finalist for the National Book Award in 1973, while his nonfiction work Laws of Heaven was the winner of the Alpha Sigma Nu Jesuit Book Award in Theology. As a Jesuit scholastic, he spent three years teaching English at St. Xavier High School in Cincinnati, Ohio, where he directed several plays, including The Teahouse of the August Moon. He left the Jesuit order and served briefly as a paratrooper in Korea.

== Translations ==
- Japan Sinks by Sakyo Komatsu
- The Sea and Poison by Shusaku Endo
- Spring Snow by Yukio Mishima
- Runaway Horses by Yukio Mishima
- The Pornographers by Akiyuki Nosaka

== Books ==
- Dust and Gingko Leaves (published in Japanese translation by Kodansha)
- Laws of Heaven (1992)
