= List of places of scenic beauty of Japan (Shizuoka) =

This list is of the places of scenic beauty of Japan located within the Prefecture of Shizuoka.

== National Places of Scenic Beauty ==
As of 1 August 2025, eleven Places have been designated at a national level (including one *Special Place of Scenic Beauty); Mount Fuji spans the prefectural borders with Yamanashi.

Site	Municipality	Comments	Image	Coordinates	Type	Ref.
*Mount Fuji 富士山; Fuji-san		also an Historic Site and a component of the UNESCO World Heritage Site Fujisan, sacred place and source of artistic inspiration; the designation includes an area of Yamanashi Prefecture		35°22′03″N 138°43′46″E	10	
Izu Southwest Coast 伊豆西南海岸; Izu seinan kaigan	Matsuzaki/Nishiizu/Minamiizu			34°39′48″N 138°47′23″E	5, 6	
Rakuju-en 楽寿園; Rakuju-en	Mishima	also a Natural Monument		35°07′23″N 138°54′41″E	5, 7	
Miho no Matsubara 三保松原; Miho matsubara	Shizuoka			35°00′17″N 138°31′38″E	3, 8	
Saioku-ji Gardens 柴屋寺庭園; Saiokuji teien	Shizuoka	also an Historic Site		34°57′22″N 138°19′59″E	1	
Seiken-ji Gardens 清見寺庭園; Seikenji teien	Shizuoka			35°02′52″N 138°30′46″E	1	
Nihondaira 日本平; Nihondaira	Shizuoka			34°58′22″N 138°27′56″E	10, 11	
Shiraito Falls 白糸ノ滝; Shiraito-no-taki	Fujinomiya	also a Natural Monument		35°18′47″N 138°35′14″E	6	
Ryōtan-ji Gardens 竜潭寺庭園; Ryōtanji teien	Hamamatsu			34°49′44″N 137°40′04″E	1	
Rinzai-ji Gardens 臨済寺庭園; Rinzaiji teien	Shizuoka			34°59′39″N 138°22′36″E	1	
Former Numazu Imperial Villa Gardens 旧沼津御用邸苑地; Kyū-Numazu goyōtei enchi	Numazu			35°05′44″N 138°51′49″E	3, 11	

== Prefectural Places of Scenic Beauty ==
As of 1 May 2024, seven Places have been designated at a prefectural level.

Site	Municipality	Comments	Image	Coordinates	Type	Ref.
Kogarashi Forest 木枯森; Kagarashi-no-mori	Shizuoka			34°58′41″N 138°20′22″E		
Makaya-ji Gardens 摩訶耶寺庭園; Makayaji teien	Hamamatsu			34°49′03″N 137°33′23″E		
Daifuku-ji Gardens 大福寺庭園; Daifukuji teien	Hamamatsu			34°49′45″N 137°32′59″E		
Chōraku-ji Gardens 長楽寺庭園; Chōrakuji teien	Hamamatsu			34°48′46″N 137°38′21″E		
Lake Hamana 浜名湖; Hamana-ko	Hamamatsu, Kosai			34°44′29″N 137°35′16″E		
Sakuragaike 桜ケ池; Sakuragaike	Omaezaki			34°38′29″N 138°08′43″E		
Jissō-ji Gardens 実相寺庭園; Jissōji teien	Hamamatsu			34°49′19″N 137°40′43″E		

== Municipal Places of Scenic Beauty ==
As of 1 May 2024, seventeen Places have been designated at a municipal level.

== Registered Places of Scenic Beauty ==
As of 1 August 2025, three Monuments have been registered (as opposed to designated) as Places of Scenic Beauty at a national level.

Place	Municipality	Comments	Image	Coordinates	Type	Ref.
Jikkoku Pass (Mount Higane) 十国峠（日金山） Jikkoku tōge (Higane-san)	Atami, Kannami			35°05′46″N 139°04′18″E		
Taishō-en 帯笑園; Taishō-en	Numazu			35°05′44″N 138°51′49″E		
Fugesturō Gardens 浮月楼庭園; Fugesturō teien	Shizuoka			35°05′44″N 138°51′49″E		

== See also ==
- Cultural Properties of Japan
- List of parks and gardens of Shizuoka Prefecture
- List of Historic Sites of Japan (Shizuoka)
