= Rakuju-en =

Park in Mishima, Shizuoka prefecture, Japan

- 楽寿園
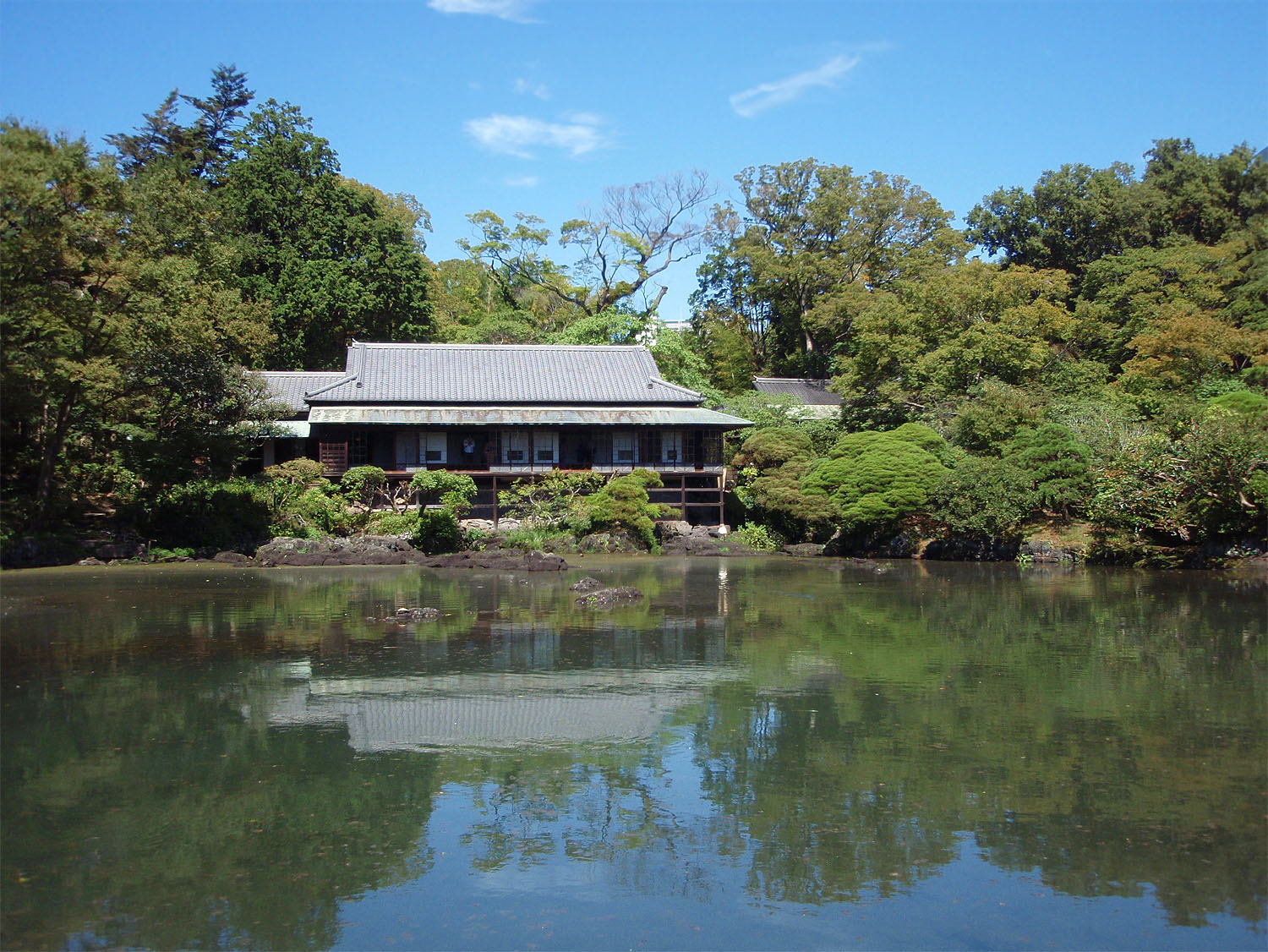
- Rakujukan and Kohamaga pond

- Location within Shizuoka Prefecture Location within Japan
- Type: Japanese garden
- Location: Mishima, Shizuoka, Japan
- Coordinates: 35°07′23″N 138°54′41″E

Rakuju-en (楽寿園) is a public park with a Japanese garden and zoo, located in the city of Mishima, Shizuoka Prefecture, Japan. It was designated as a National Place of Scenic Beauty of Japan as well as a Natural monument of Japan in 1954. In 2012, the Rakuju-en was designated as part of the Izu Peninsula Geopark.

== History ==
The site of Rakuju-en was once known as Kohamayama, and was the location of a Buddhist temple (Aizen-in), and two Shinto shrines (Sengen Jinja, Hirose Jinja), all of which no longer exist. The property was purchased by Prince Komatsu Akihito in 1890, and was developed into a villa with a Kyoto-style sukiya-zukuri-style residence, with extensive gardens. This residence, the "Rakuju-kan" still exists, and exhibits the works of six Meiji period Imperial Household Artists, which can be viewed on prior appointment.

On his death in 1911, the property passed to Korean Crown Prince Yi Un who named it Changdeokgung after one of the palaces in Seoul. In 1927, he sold the property to industrialist and property developer Oake Keizo, who was originally from Izu Province. In 1952, the property passed to the city of Mishima and was opened as a public park.

The extensive grounds also include the Mishima Local History Museum with a JNR Class C58 steam locomotive, a small amusement park and a small zoo.

== Gallery ==
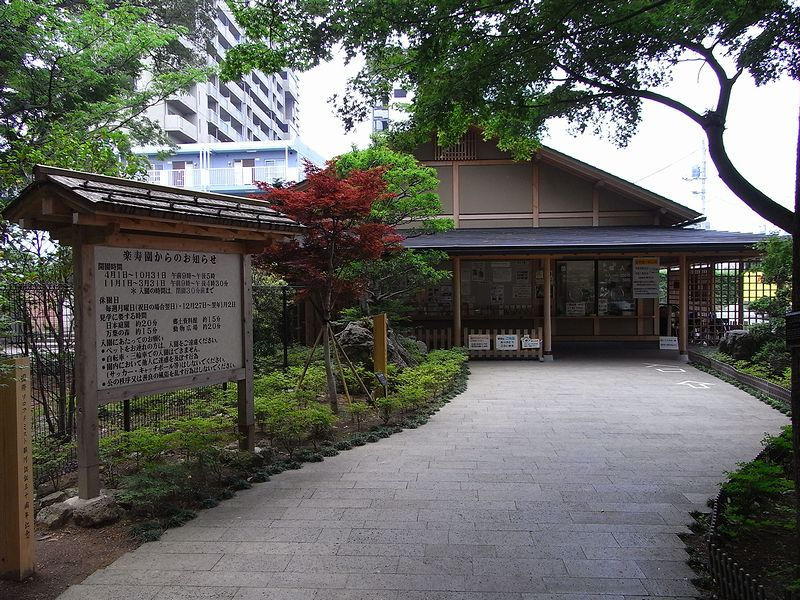
Main Gate

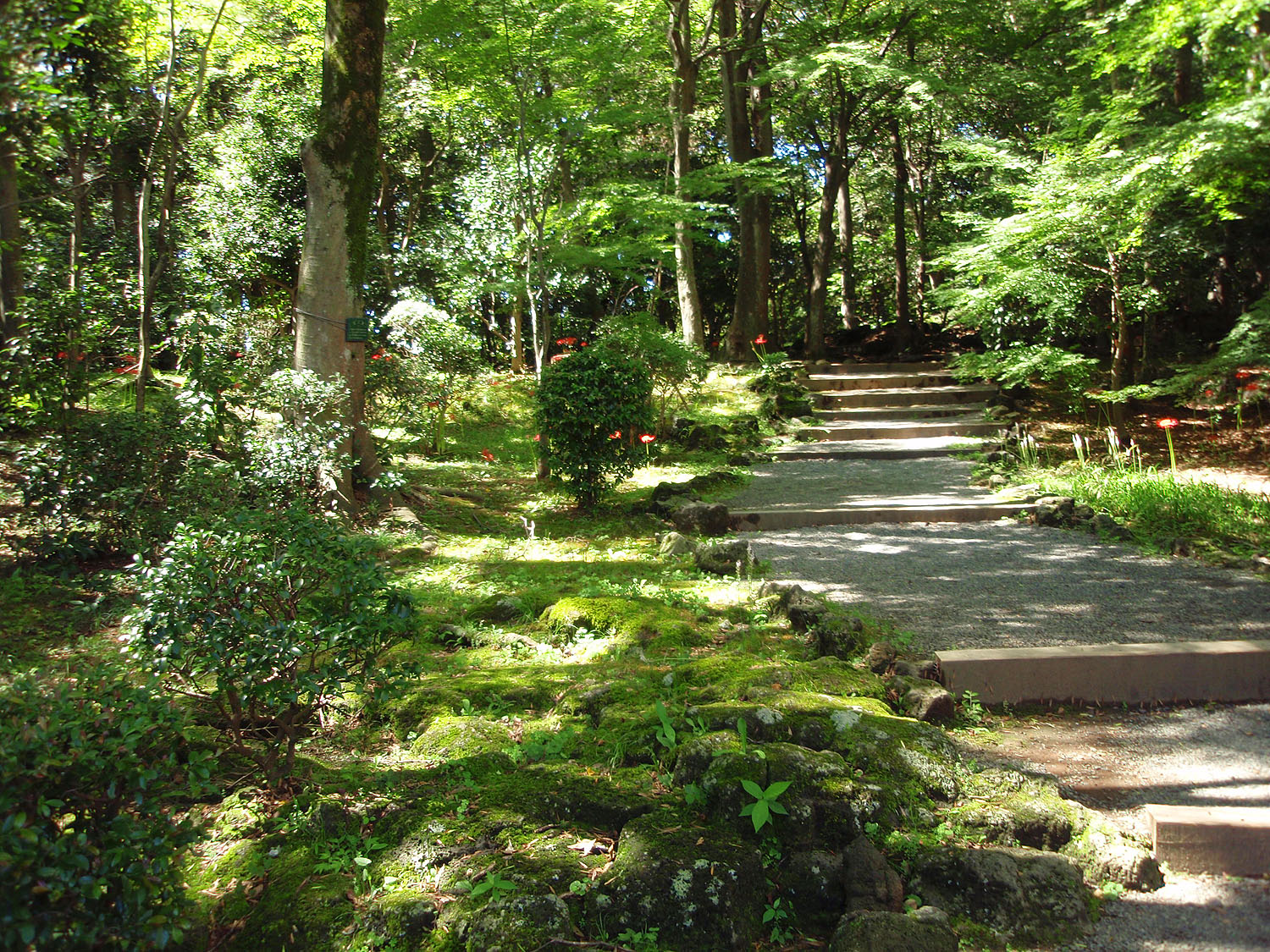
Walkway near Main Gate

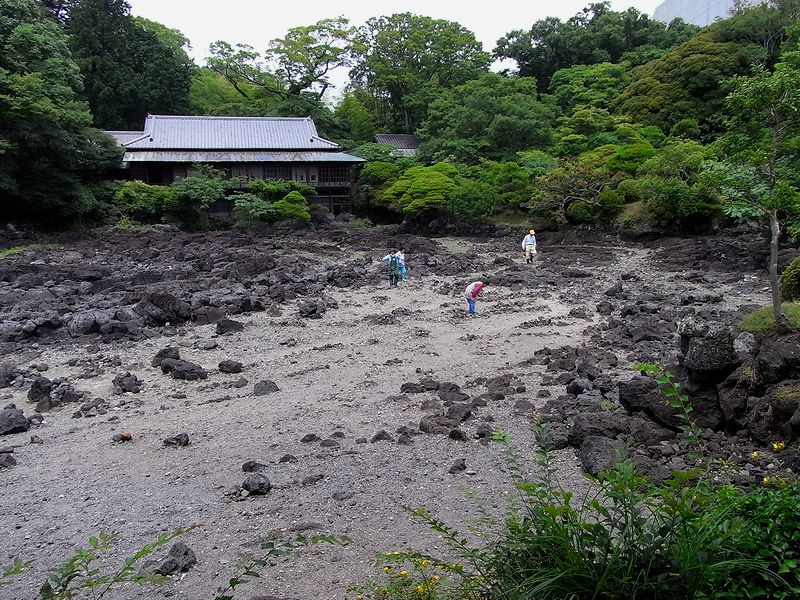
Rakuju-kan

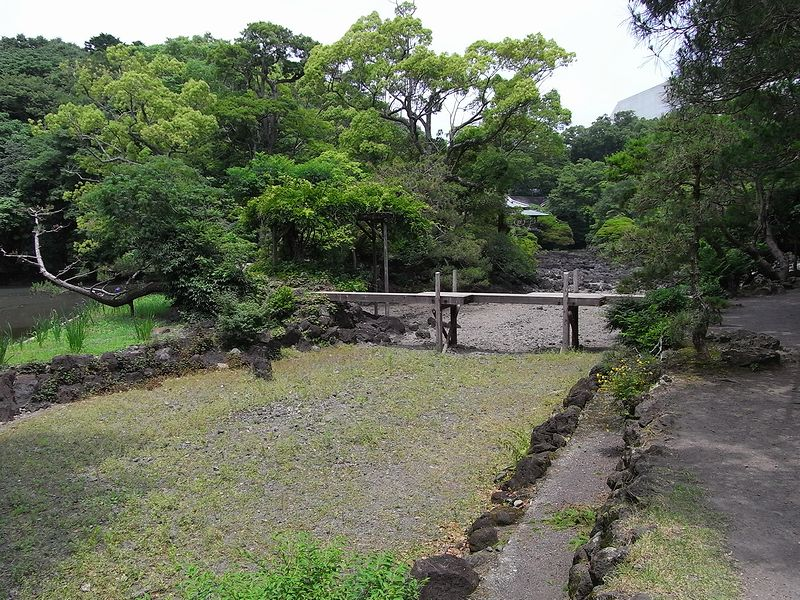
Japanese gardens

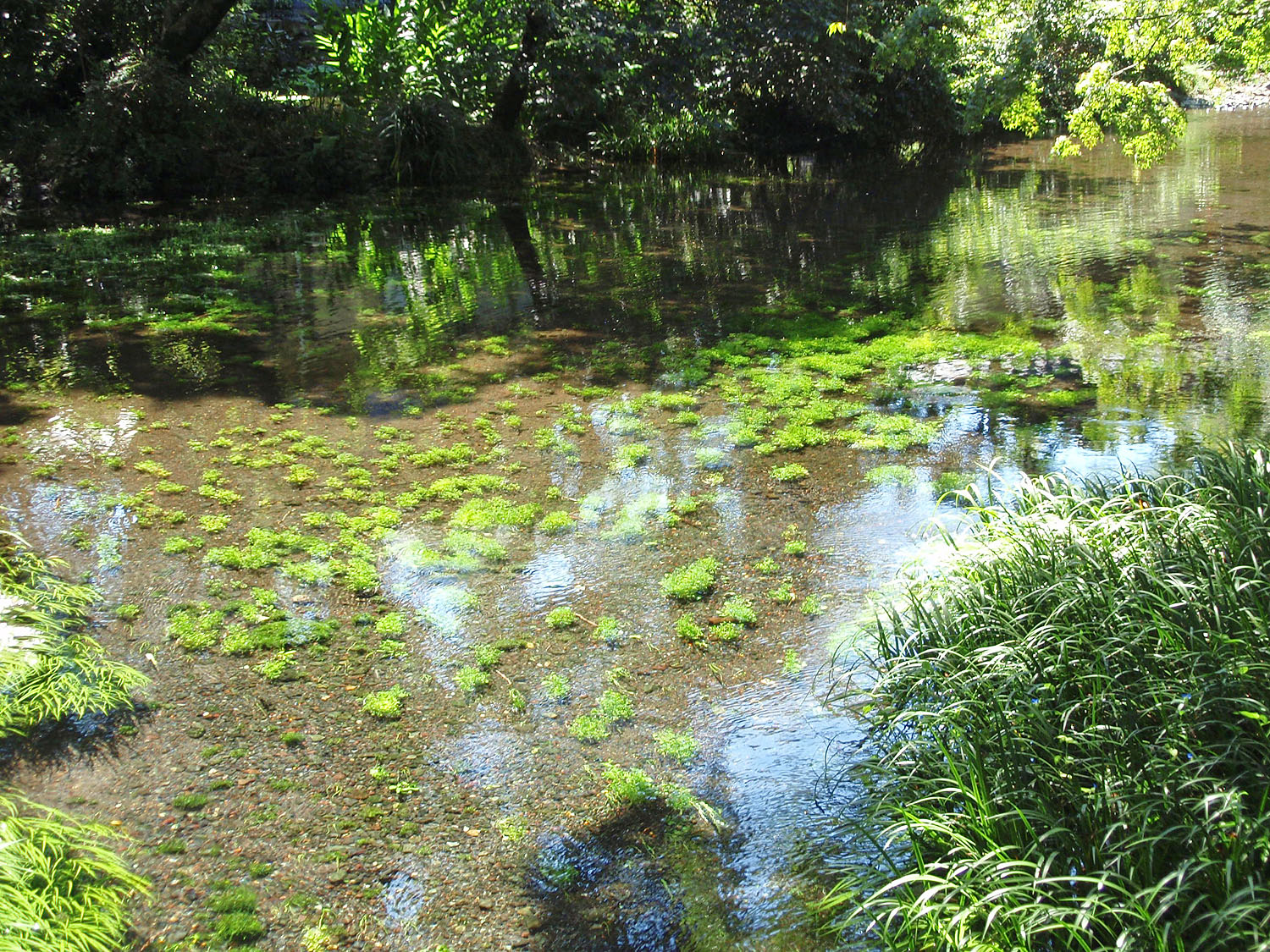
spring and small creek

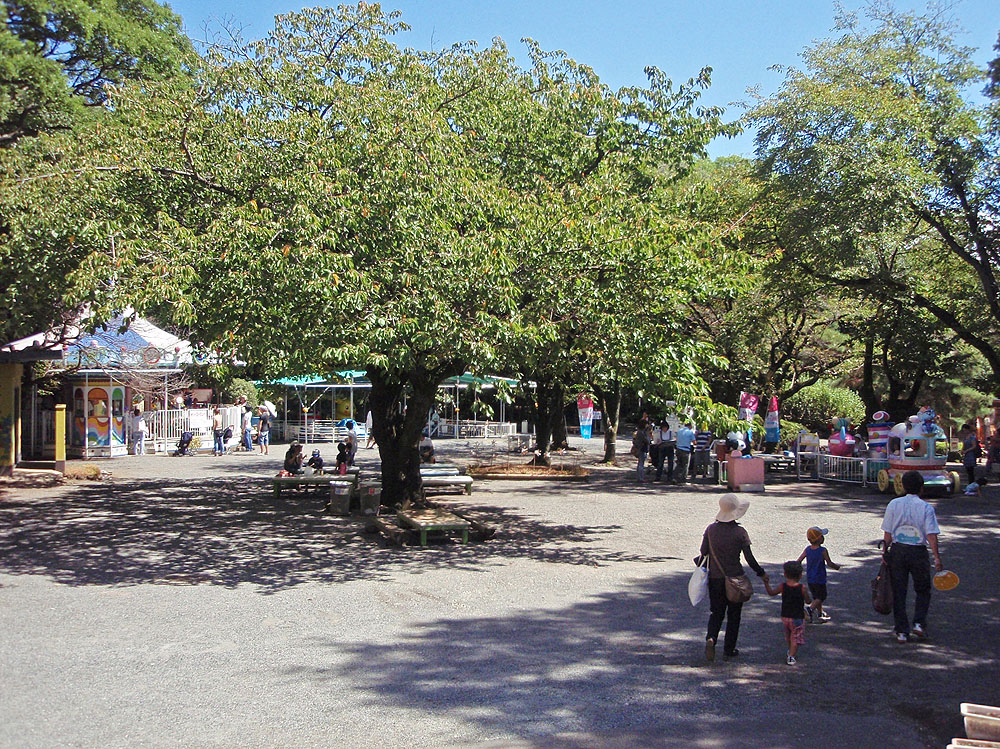
Amusement park

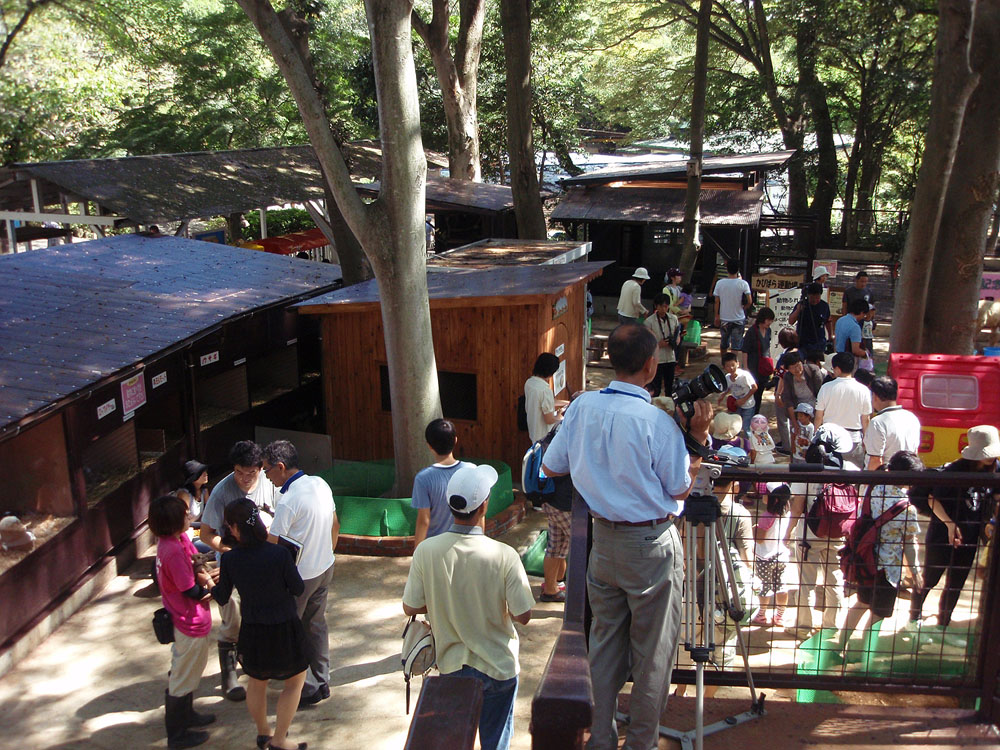
Petting zoo

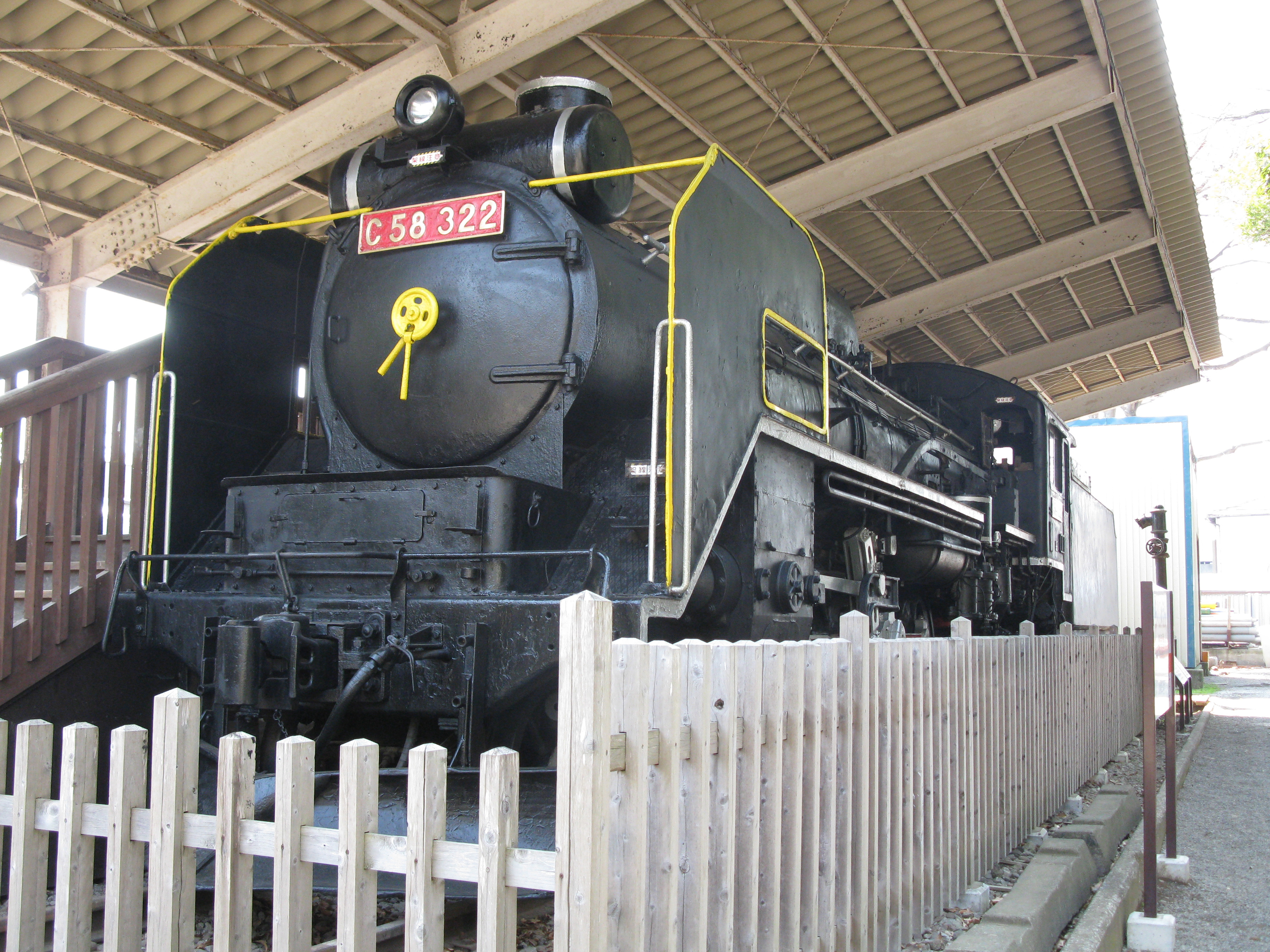
C58-322 steam locomotive

== See also ==
- List of Places of Scenic Beauty of Japan (Shizuoka)
