= Rinzai-ji =

- 臨済寺
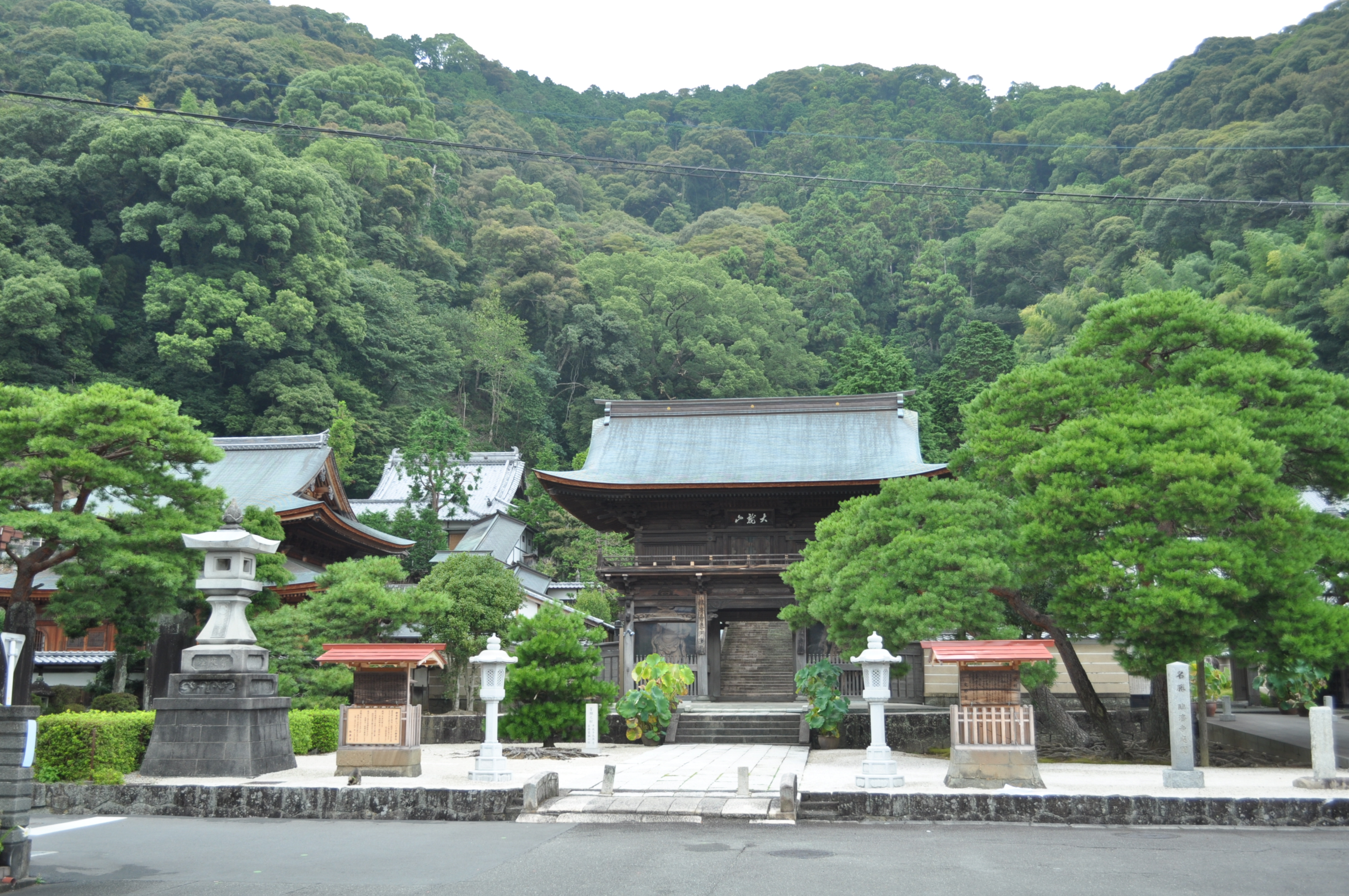
- Rinzai-ji Sanmon

- Rinzai-ji Rinzai-ji (Japan)

Religion
- Affiliation: Buddhism
- Deity: Amida Nyōrai
- Rite: Rinzai school

Location
- Location: 7-1 Ōiwa-chō, Aoi-ku, Shizuoka-shi, Shizuoka-ken
- Country: Japan
- Interactive map of Rinzai-ji
- Coordinates: 34°59′35″N 138°22′33″E

Architecture
- Founder: Imagawa Ucjichika
- Completed: 1536

Rinzai-ji (Japanese: 臨済寺), is a Buddhist temple belonging to the Myōshin-ji branch of the Rinzai school of Japanese Zen, Buddhism located in the Aoi ward of the city of Shizuoka, Shizuoka Prefecture, Japan. Its main image is a statue of Amida Nyōrai. It was the bodaiji of the Imagawa clan, a powerful Sengoku period daimyō clan. The temple is noted for its Japanese garden, which is a nationally designated Place of Scenic Beauty; however, the temple is only open to the public for two days each autumn, and it is not possible to view this garden other than during that period.

== History ==
Rinzai-ji was founded in 1536, by Imagawa Ujichika for his son, Imagawa Yoshimoto, on the site of a villa owned by his mother at the base of Shizuhata Castle. Yoshimoto had been sent into the priesthood as he was the third son, and was not regarded as being in the line of succession. His uncle, Sessai Chōrō was the founding priest. However, when both of Yoshimoto's elder brothers died, he returned to a secular life and became chieftain of the Imagawa clan after a bloody succession dispute. The temple continued to be used as the bodaiji for the clan. The temple was burned down in 1568 when the Takeda clan of Kai Province invaded Suruga Province.

When the young Tokugawa Ieyasu was held hostage in Sunpu by the Imagawa clan, he was sent to Rinzai-ji to be tutored by Sessai Chōrō. During the invasion of Suruga Province by the Takeda clan in 1568, Rinzai-ji was burned down. It was rebuilt by Tokugawa Ieyasu in 1582. A number of buildings at the temple date from the Edo period, including the current Main Hall and Sanmon.

== Cultural properties ==
=== National Important Cultural Properties ===
==== Hondō ====
The Hondō of Rinzai-ji is an irimoya-style structure from the early 17th century. It has a frontage of 22.7 meters ad a depth of 16.8 meters. It was designated an Important Cultural Property in 1983.

=== National Place of Scenic Beauty ===
==== Rinzai-ji gardens ====
The Japanese garden at Rinzai-ji became a nationally designated Place of Scenic Beauty in 1936.

== Gallery ==
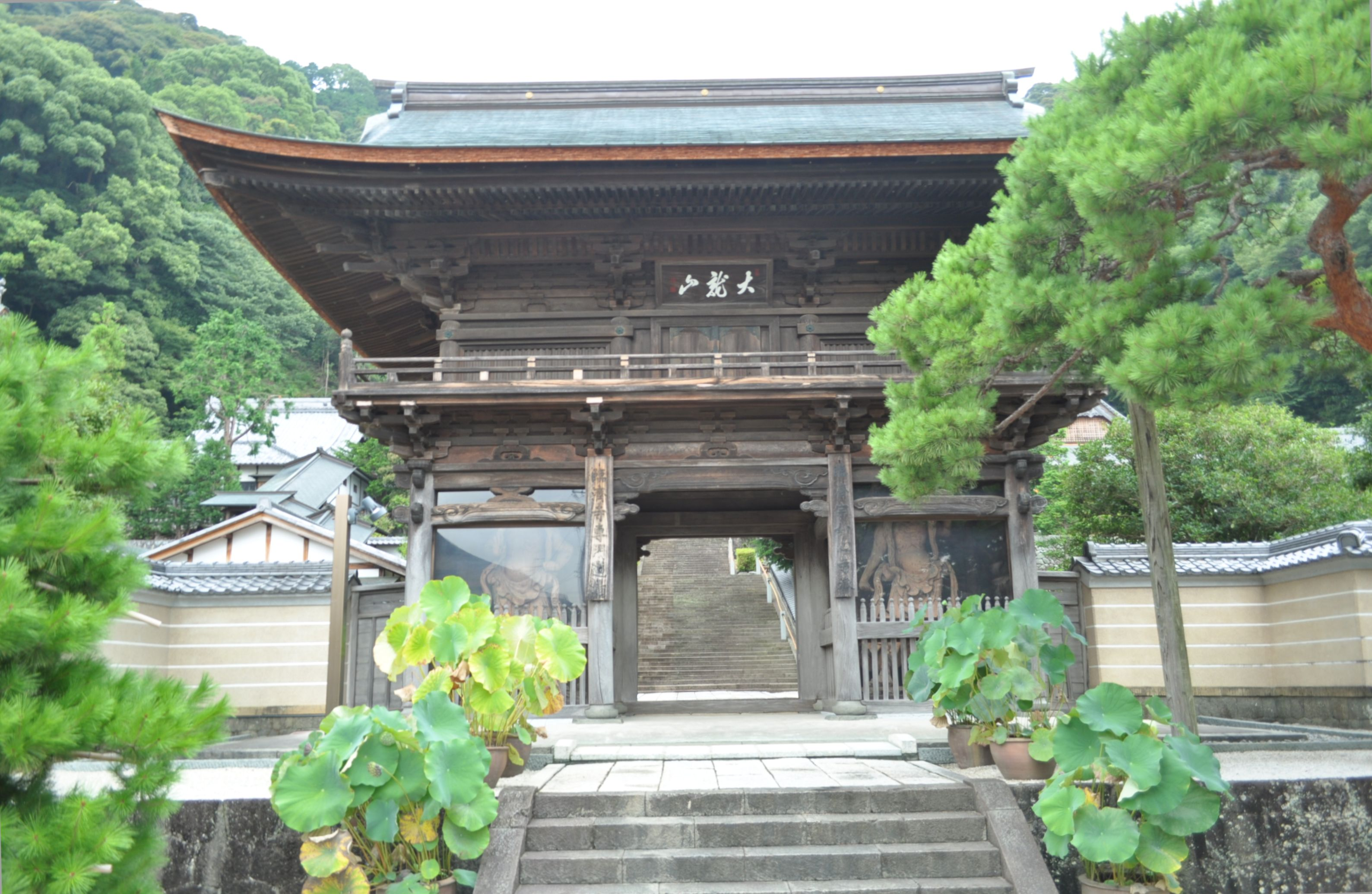
Sanmon

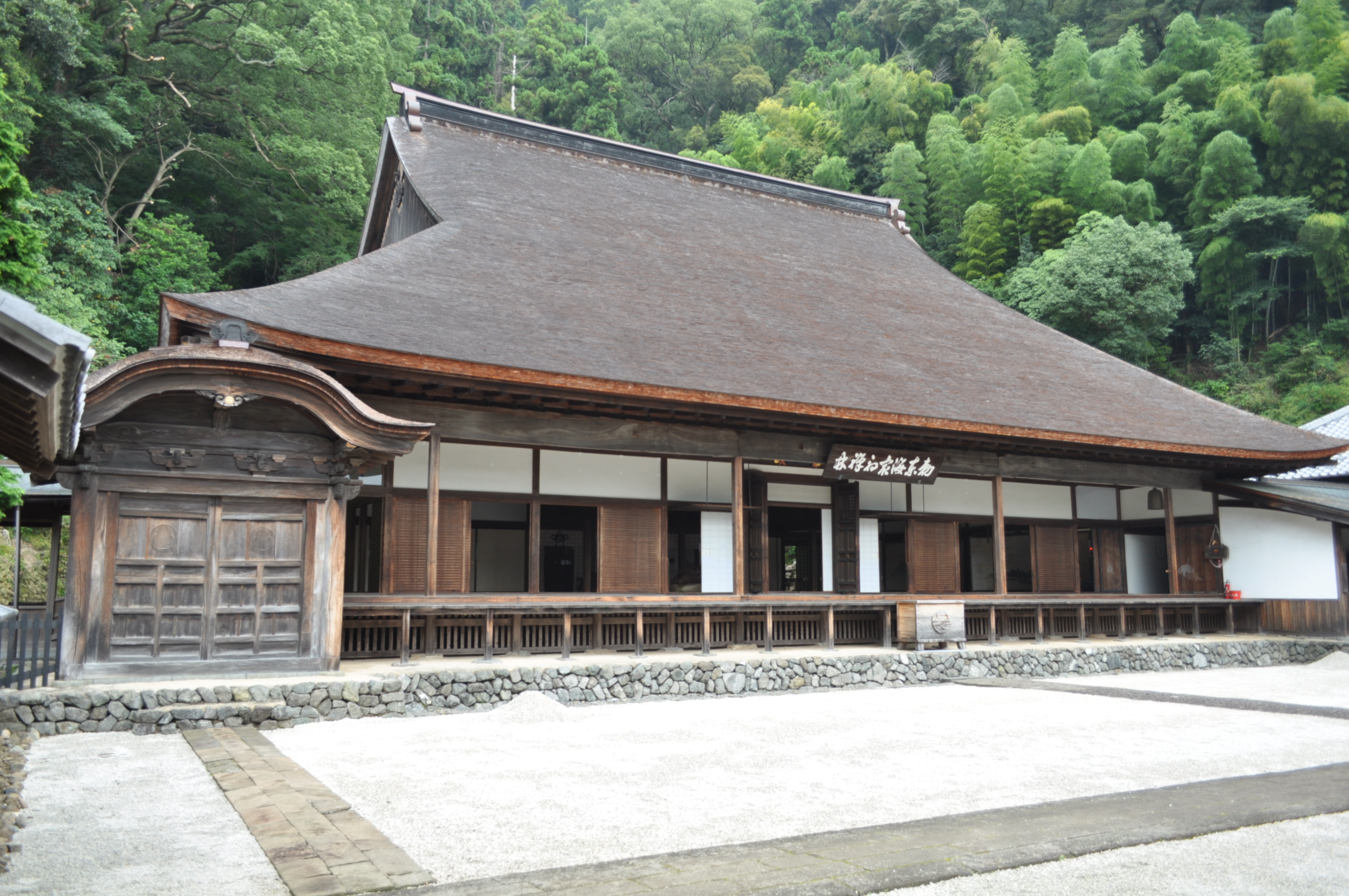
Hondō

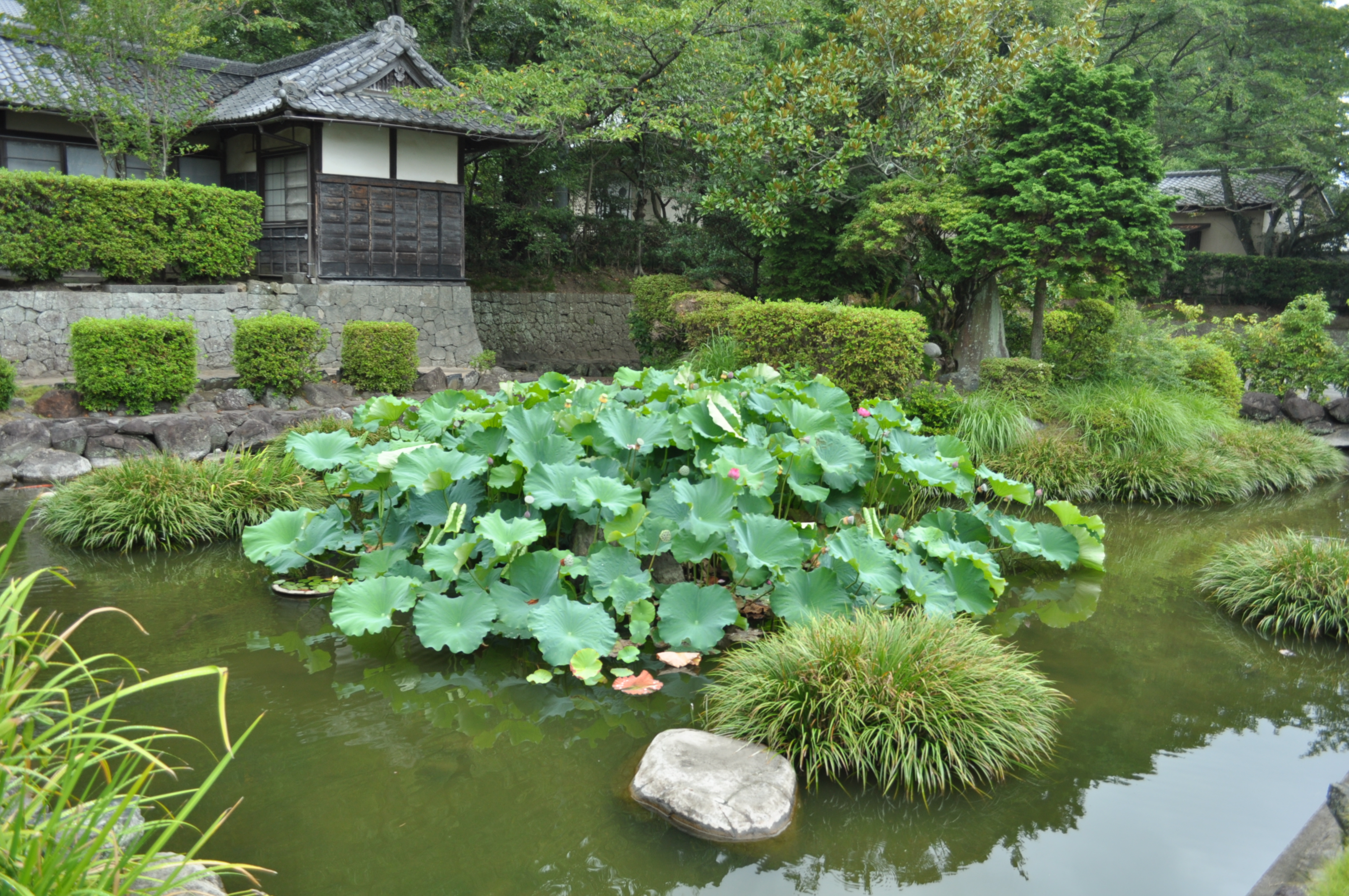
Rinzai-ji gardens

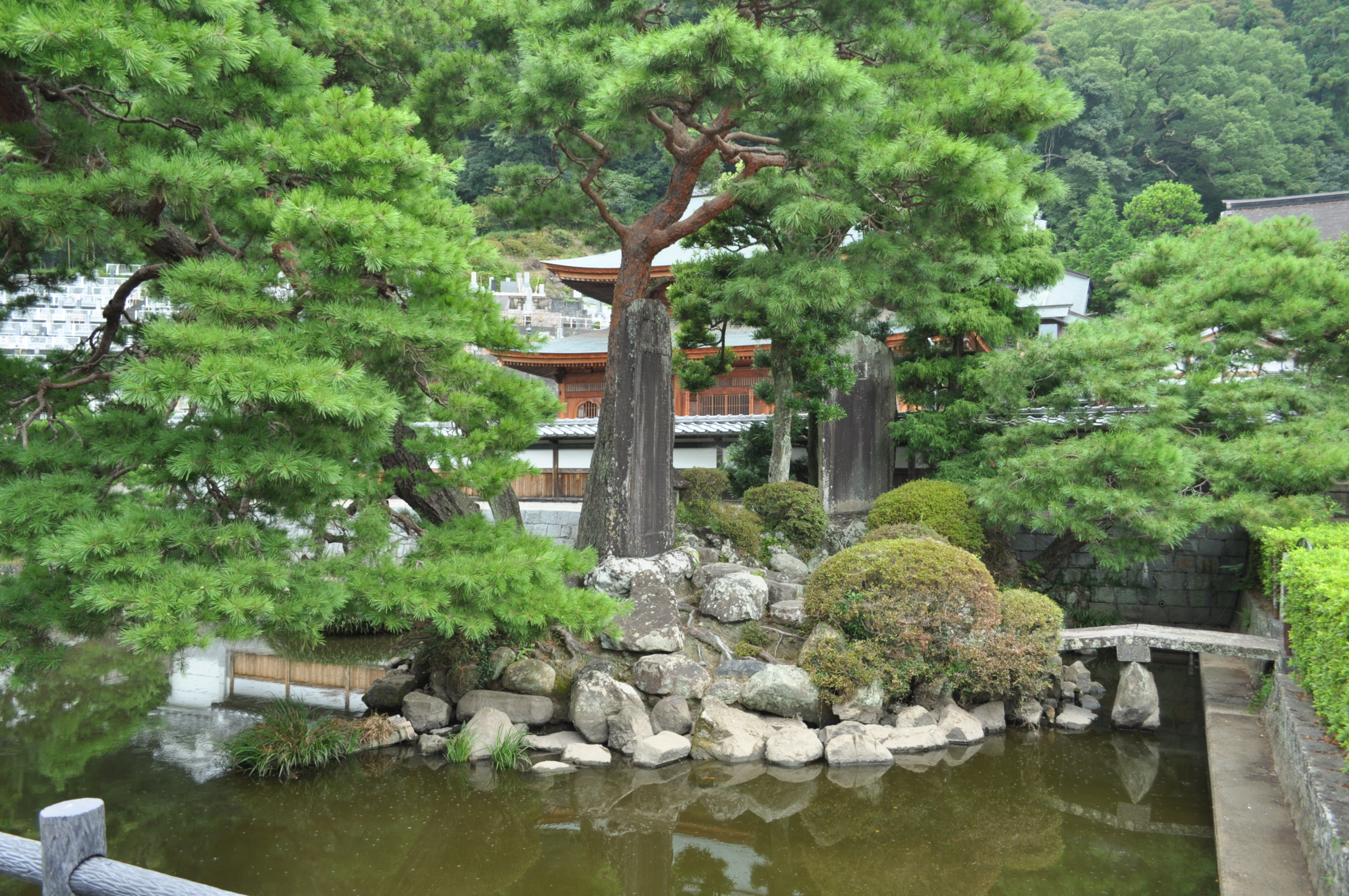
Rinzai-ji gardens

== See also ==
- List of Places of Scenic Beauty of Japan (Shizuoka)
