= Spring Snow (film) =

- DVD cover
- Directed by: Isao Yukisada
- Written by: Shinsuke Sato; Chihiro Ito
- Based on: Spring Snow by Yukio Mishima
- Produced by: Morio Amagi; Kei Haruna; Minami Ichikawa; Hirotsugu Usui
- Starring: Satoshi Tsumabuki; Yūko Takeuchi; Sosuke Takaoka; Tomorowo Taguchi; Takaaki Enoki
- Cinematography: Mark Lee Ping Bin
- Edited by: Tsuyoshi Imai
- Music by: Taro Iwashiro
- Production companies: Cine Bazar; Fuji Television; Hakuhodo DY Holdings; Horipro; Stardust Promotion
- Distributed by: Toho
- Release date: 9 April 2005 (Japan)
- Running time: 150 minutes
- Country: Japan
- Language: Japanese

Spring Snow (Japanese: 春の雪, Hepburn: Haru no Yuki) is a 2005 film adaptation of Yukio Mishima's novel of the same name, directed by Isao Yukisada. The cast includes Satoshi Tsumabuki as Kiyoaki Matsugae, Yūko Takeuchi as Satoko Ayakura, and Sosuke Takaoka as Shigekuni Honda.

Spring Snow was nominated for nine Japanese Academy Awards. "Be My Last", the main theme song for the film, was performed by Hikaru Utada. This was her 14th Japanese-language single release.

== Plot ==
Spring Snow starts in 1912, as Emperor Taishō begins his reign and Japan's upper classes (kazoku) are mimicking the tastes and manners of Europe's aristocrats. Among them are two children, Kiyoaki Matsugae who is the only son of the Marquess Matsugae and Satoko Ayakura who is the only daughter of the Earl Ayakura.

Even as a child, Satoko had romantic aspirations for her friendship with Kiyoaki. However, her father, wary of the womanizing ways of Kiyoaki's father, fears for his daughter's involvement. He instructs her tutor, Tadeshina, to ensure the girl's heart is not broken.

A decade later, as Kiyoaki is finishing Gakushūin high school, the beautiful and eligible Satoko is still stuck on her childhood sweetheart. To avoid her, Kiyoaki playfully considers setting her up with his uptight school friend, Shigekuni Honda, and writes a lurid confession of frequent trips to Tokyo's entertainment (the theatre of Goethe's Faust) quarter, then posts the letter to Satoko before Shigekuni can stop him. That evening, Kiyoaki has second thoughts, and requests the letter be destroyed, as his decadent adventures were fabrications.

== Cast ==
- Satoshi Tsumabuki
- Yūko Takeuchi
- Sosuke Takaoka
- Tomorowo Taguchi
- Takaaki Enoki
- Kenjirō Ishimaru
- Michiyo Ōkusu
- Kyōko Kishida
- Ayako Wakao
