= The Sea of Fertility =

Series of novels by Yukio Mishima

First edition covers

The Sea of Fertility (豊饒の海, Hōjō no Umi) is a tetralogy of novels written by the Japanese author Yukio Mishima. The four novels are Spring Snow (1969), Runaway Horses (1969), The Temple of Dawn (1970), and The Decay of the Angel (1971). The series, which Mishima began writing in 1964 and which was his final work, is usually thought of as his masterpiece. Its title refers to the Mare Fecunditatis, a lunar mare. The first English translated editions by Alfred A. Knopf and the Charles E. Tuttle Company featured cover designs by the graphic artist Joseph del Gaudio.

== Plot ==
The main timeline of the story stretches from 1912 to 1975. The viewpoint of all four books is that of Shigekuni Honda, a law student in Spring Snow who eventually becomes a wealthy retired judge in The Decay of the Angel. Each of the novels depicts what Honda comes to believe are successive reincarnations of his schoolfriend Kiyoaki Matsugae, and Honda's attempts to save them from the early deaths to which they seem to be condemned by karma. This results in both personal and professional embarrassment for Honda, and eventually destroys him.

The friend's successive reincarnations are:

1. Kiyoaki Matsugae, an emotionally turbulent aristocrat
2. Isao Iinuma, a nationalist influenced by the story of the Shinpūren rebellion
3. Ying Chan, a physically beautiful and indolent Thai princess
4. Tōru Yasunaga, a brilliant yet manipulative and sadistic orphan

Other characters who appear in more than one book include Satoko Ayakura (Kiyoaki's lover), Tadeshina (Satoko's maid), Imperial Prince Toin, Shigeyuki Iinuma (Kiyoaki's servant and Isao's father), Keiko Hisamatsu, and Rié (Honda's wife).

== Background ==
Although The Temple of Dawn contains lengthy arguments in favour of the concept of reincarnation, Mishima's biographers note that he did not believe in it himself. An earlier work of about the same length, Kyoko's House, had been spurned by critics; it has been conjectured that he embarked on The Sea of Fertility in defiant response. It expresses many of Mishima's deepest-held convictions about the nature and purposes of human life, and the last book is thought to encapsulate an (extremely negative) personal assessment of himself and his own legacy.

== Response ==
The tetralogy was described by Paul Theroux as "the most complete vision we have of Japan in the twentieth century". Charles Solomon wrote in 1990 that "the four novels remain one of the outstanding works of 20th-Century literature and a summary of the author's life and work." Although the first book, Spring Snow, is a loving recreation of Japan in the brief Taishō period, and is well-grounded in its time and place, references to current affairs are generally tangential to what is later to become Honda's obsessive quest to understand the workings of individual fate and to save his friend. Richard T. Kelly wrote that the tetralogy reveals "all his gifts – an eye for detail and scene-making, a sensuous regard for the physical, and a cool detachment that could be terrifying in its terseness."

Yasser Nasser of The Bubble said that "the first book is by far the best, presenting a vision of Japan that is both alien and relatable to the Western reader."

== Volumes ==
1. Spring Snow (春の雪, Haru no Yuki), 1965–1967, published 1969
2. Runaway Horses (奔馬, Honba), 1967–1968, published 1969
3. The Temple of Dawn (暁の寺, Akatsuki no Tera), 1968–1970, published 1970
4. The Decay of the Angel (天人五衰, Tennin Gosui), 1970–1971, published 1971

== See also ==
- Mitama
