= Hagoromo (play) =

Noh play

羽衣
- English title: The Feather Mantle
- Category: 3rd — katsura mono
- Characters: shite angel waki Hakuryō, a fisherman wakizure companion(s)
- Place: Pine Grove of Miho, Suruga Bay
- Time: spring, at night
- Sources: Tango fudoki (8th century); Nōin (11th century)
- Schools: all

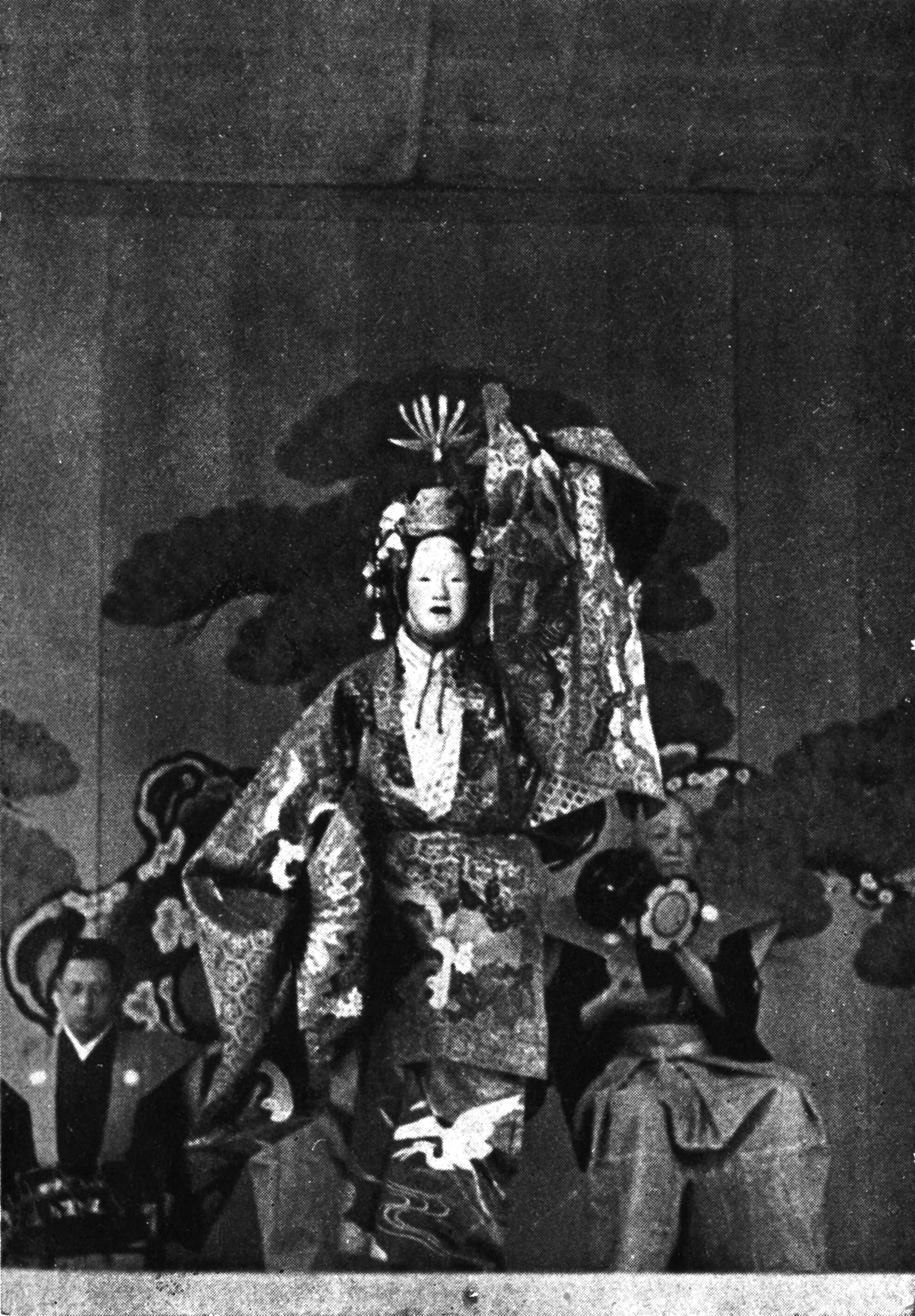
Hagoromo, UMEWAKA Minoru II(2世梅若実), 1940

Hagoromo (羽衣, The Feather Mantle) is among the most-performed Japanese Noh plays. It is an example of the traditional swan maiden motif.

== Sources and history ==
The earliest recorded version of the legend dates to the eighth century. The play however apparently combines two legends, one concerning the origins of the Suruga Dance (Suruga-mai) and another the descent of an angel onto Udo Beach. A parallel story may also be found in the 14th volume of the fifth-century Sou-shen chi. A poem by the 11th century poet Nōin is quoted.

The authorship of the Noh play Hagoromo is unknown. The earliest references to the play in historical records date to 1524, which suggests that it was written well after Zeami's time.

== Plot ==
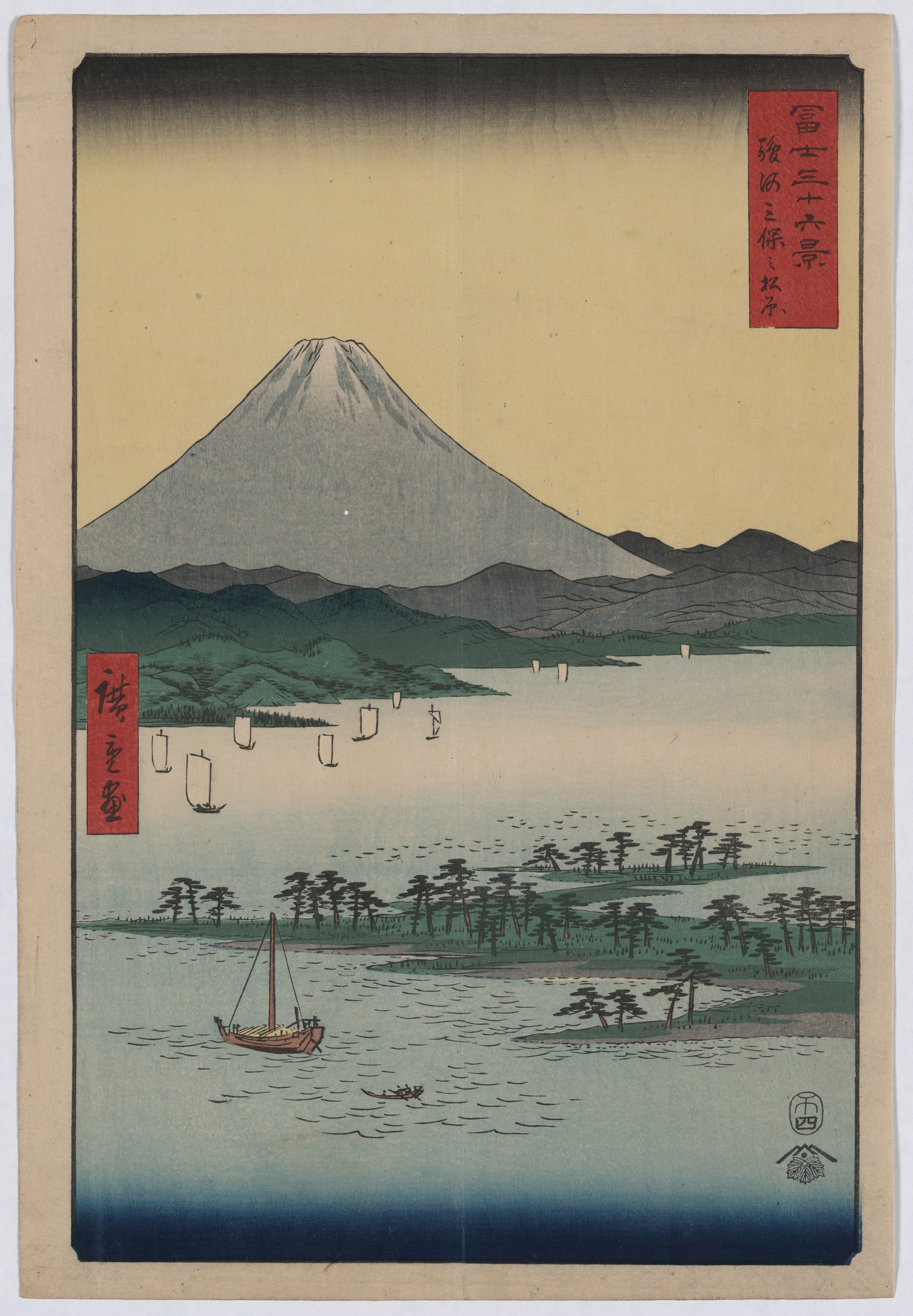
Woodblock print (Hiroshige, 1858) depicting the beach at Miho, where Hagoromo is set.

A fisherman is walking with his companions at night when he finds the Hagoromo, the magical feather-mantle of a tennin (an aerial spirit or celestial dancer) hanging on a bough. The tennin sees him taking it and demands its return—she cannot return to Heaven without it. The fisherman argues with her, and finally promises to return it, if she will show him her dance or part of it. She accepts his offer. The Chorus explains the dance as symbolic of the daily changes of the moon. The words about "three, five, and fifteen" refer to the number of nights in the moon's changes. In the finale, the tennin disappears like a mountain slowly hidden in mist.

== Adaptations ==
W. B. Yeats' At the Hawk's Well drew extensively from the Hagoromo legend.

An abridged version of the plot of play is attested in German, with the name Das Federkleid, in Japanische Märchen und Sagen (1885). An English translation exists in the book Green Willow; and other Japanese fairy tales, with the name The Robe of Feathers.

A literary treatment of the play was given as The Fisherman and the Moon-Maiden in Japanese Fairy World (1880). Another version exists with the name The Angel's Robe.

Osamu Tezuka based a short story in his Phoenix series on the story of the Hagoromo, but with a sci-fi twist, featuring a time-displaced human girl from the distant future instead of a tennin. A 2004 short film based on Tezuka´s Phoenix features a drastically different retelling. The story was later adapted into the manga and anime series Ceres, The Celestial Legend.

== See also ==
- The princess and the cowherd
- Tsuru no Ongaeshi
