= Spring Snow =

Novel by Yukio Mishima

- First edition (Japanese)
- Author: Yukio Mishima
- Original title: 春の雪 (Haru no Yuki)
- Translator: Michael Gallagher
- Language: Japanese
- Series: The Sea of Fertility
- Publisher: Shinchosha (orig.) & Alfred A. Knopf (Eng. trans.)
- Publication date: 1969
- Publication place: Japan
- English publication date: 1972
- Media type: Print (hardback & paperback)
- Pages: 269
- ISBN: 0-677-14960-3 (Eng. trans.)
- OCLC: 207633
- Dewey Decimal: 551.4/6
- LC Class: GC2 .S83 1969
- Followed by: Runaway Horses

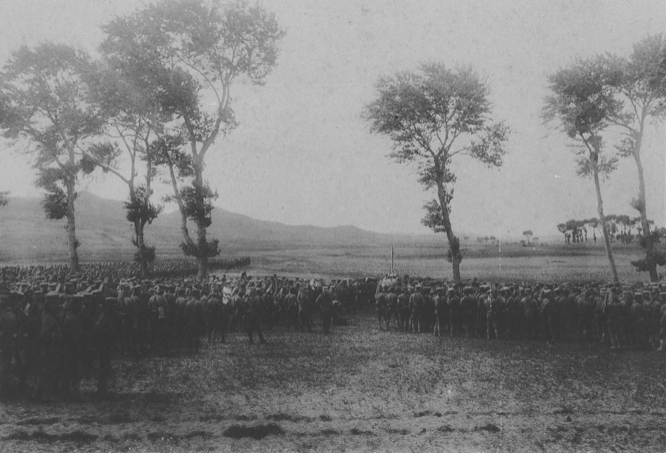
The photograph of the military funeral at Tokuri-ji described at the beginning of Spring Snow

Spring Snow (春の雪, Haru no Yuki) is a novel by Yukio Mishima, the first in his Sea of Fertility tetralogy. It was published serially in Shinchō from 1965 to 1967, and then in book form in 1969. Mishima did extensive research, including visits to Enshō-ji in Nara, to prepare for the novel.

== Plot ==
The novel is set in the early years of the Taishō period with the reign of the Emperor Taishō, and is about the relationship between Kiyoaki Matsugae, the son of a rising up and coming rich family, and Satoko Ayakura, the daughter of an aristocratic family fallen on hard times. Shigekuni Honda, a schoolfriend of Kiyoaki's, is the main witness to the events. The novel's themes centre on the conflicts in Japanese society caused by westernization in the early 20th century.

The main action stretches from October 1912 to March 1914. Kiyoaki's family originated in Kagoshima, where his dead grandfather, the former Marquis, is still revered. The family now lives in grand style near Tokyo, with wealth acquired very recently.

=== Kiyoaki's world ===
The novel opens with images from Kiyoaki's childhood, in the years after the Russo-Japanese War: including a torchlight procession witnessed by Honda, a photograph of memorial services at Tokuri-ji on 26 June 1904, a lyrical description of the Matsugae estate near Shibuya, a visit by Emperor Meiji, and an account of Kiyoaki's role as a page for Princess Kasuga during New Year's Festivities at the Imperial Palace. We are introduced to his mother, Tsujiko, and grandmother, to Shigeyuki Iinuma, his tutor, and to the serious Honda, a friend from the Peers School.

On Sunday, 27 October 1912, the 18-year-old Kiyoaki and Honda are talking on an island in the ornamental lake on the estate when they see Kiyoaki's mother, her maids, and two guests: Satoko Ayakura, the 20-year-old daughter of a count, and her great-aunt, the Abbess of Gesshu. The Ayakura family is one of twenty-eight of the rank of Urin, and they live in Azabu. Kiyoaki is aware that Satoko has a crush on him, and pretends indifference to her. Shortly after they all meet, there is a bad omen: they see a dead black dog at the top of a high waterfall. The Abbess offers to pray for it. Satoko insists on picking flowers for the dog with Kiyoaki. While Satoko is alone with Kiyoaki, she blurts out: "Kiyo, what would you do if all of a sudden I weren't here any more?" He is discomfited by the inexplicable question, and resents the fact that she has startled him with it.

Back at the house, the Abbess delivers a sermon on the doctrine of Yuishiki or the consciousness-only theory of Hosso Buddhism, telling the parable of Yuan Hsiao, the man who, in pitch darkness, drank from a skull by accident. She argues the significance of an object is bestowed by the observer.

Ten days later, on 6 November, Kiyoaki has dinner with his parents; they discuss his otachimachi (お立ち待ち), that had been held on 17 August 1909, and mention that Satoko has just rejected an offer of marriage. This explains her mysterious question. Kiyoaki and his father play billiards, then go for a stroll that reminds Kiyoaki of his father's former womanising. The marquis tries to persuade him to go with him to a brothel and he walks away in disgust. Later he cannot sleep, resolving to take revenge on Satoko for deliberately perplexing him. We are shown Kiyoaki's bedroom: a screen bearing poems of Han Shan, and a carved jade parrot. We can also see that Kiyoaki has three moles in a row on the left side of his back.

=== The Siamese princes, Iinuma and Tadeshina ===
In December, two princes arrive from Siam to study at the Peers School, and are given rooms by the Matsugaes. They are Prince Pattanadid (a younger brother of the new king, Rama VI) and his cousin, Prince Kridsada (a grandson of Rama IV), nicknamed "Chao P." and "Kri", respectively. Chao P is deeply in love with Kri's sister, Princess Chantrapa ("Ying Chan"), and wears an emerald ring she gave him as a present. They ask Kiyoaki if he has a sweetheart and he names Satoko, although he has just sent her a "wildly insulting letter" the day before, in which he claims falsely that he has recently visited a brothel for the first time and has lost all respect for women, including her. To save the situation, he telephones Satoko and makes her promise to burn any letter she receives from him, and she agrees.

Chapter 7 describes Honda's stuffy household, and includes his musings on the Laws of Manu, which he has been required to study, and an anecdote about a second cousin, Fusako, who was caught making a pass at him at a family gathering.

The two princes meet Satoko at the Imperial Theatre in Tokyo. She is courteous, and Kiyoaki concludes that she has burnt the letter. Chapter 9 portrays Shigeyuki Iinuma, a reactionary 23-year-old from Kagoshima, who has been Kiyoaki's tutor for the last six years. He bemoans his ineffectiveness, and the decadent state of Japan, while worshipping at the Matsugae family's shrine. Shortly after the new year, Kiyoaki reveals to him that he knows of his affair with a maid, Miné, and blackmails him into concealing his own trysts with Satoko. Satoko's maid, old Tadeshina, promises to help.

In Chapter 11, we are given an extract from Kiyoaki's dream-diary.

=== Kiyoaki and Satoko ===
One day in February, Satoko's parents travel to Kyoto to see a sick relative; taking advantage of this, she persuades Kiyoaki to skip school and join her on a rickshaw ride through the snow. They kiss for the first time. When they pass the parade ground of the Azabu 3rd Regiment he has a vision of thousands of ghostly soldiers standing upon it, reproducing the scene in the photograph described in Chapter 1. Miles away, Honda has a similar premonitory shudder, seeing his friend's empty desk in the schoolroom. The next morning, they meet very early in the school grounds and have a long conversation in which Honda expresses his conviction of the reality of fate and inevitability.

In Chapter 14, it is revealed that Kiyoaki has rewarded Iinuma for his cooperation by giving him the key to the library so that the tutor can meet Miné there secretly. Iinuma hates him for this but accepts the arrangement. Satoko writes her first love letter, and Kiyoaki, torn between his morbid pride and his genuine passion for her, finally replies to it sincerely.

On 6 April 1913, the Marquis Matsugae holds a cherry blossom viewing party for his friend Prince (Haruhisa) Toin, inviting only Satoko and her parents, the two princes, and Baron Shinkawa and his wife. The guests are depicted as ludicrously half-Westernised. During a private moment, Satoko and Kiyoaki embrace, but suddenly Satoko turns away and spurns him, calling him childish. Infuriated, Kiyoaki tells Iinuma what has happened, and the tutor responds with a story which makes him realise that Satoko did indeed read the letter she was supposed to burn. He concludes that she has been leading him on all along in order to humiliate him.

Breaking off all contact, he eventually burns a letter from her in front of Iinuma.

=== Prince Harunori and Satoko ===
Towards the end of April, the Marquis tells Kiyoaki that Satoko is being considered as a wife for Prince Toin's third son. Kiyoaki responds with indifference. The Marquis then announces to his son's surprise that Iinuma is to be dismissed: the affair with Miné has been discovered. The same night, Kiyoaki has another dream.

In early May, Satoko visits the Toinnomiya villa by the sea and meets Prince Harunori. Formal proposals quickly follow by mail. Kiyoaki is filled with satisfaction to see Satoko, Tadeshina and Iinuma drift out of his life; and he takes pride in his lack of emotion when Iinuma tearfully takes his leave, later comparing his own ultra-correct conduct with the elegant progress of a beetle on his window-sill. The absence of Iinuma makes that year's omiyasama festival, commemorating Kiyoaki's grandfather, more perfunctory than ever.

In the meantime, the Thai princes have moved from the Matsugae household to private dormitories on the grounds of the Peers School. Chao P. asks Kiyoaki to return him his emerald ring from the marquis's safe-keeping; he has not received a letter from Ying Chan in months, and is pining for her. Kiyoaki tears up the one last letter he receives from Satoko. One day, his mother leaves for the Ayakura villa in order to congratulate the family, casually informing him that the marriage to Prince Harunori will now definitely go ahead. All of a sudden he feels emotionally shattered, and spends the next few hours in a daze. At the end of it, he realizes he is in love with Satoko. This is the turning point of the novel.

=== Kasumicho and Kamakura ===
He takes a rickshaw to the Ayakura villa, and, making sure his mother has left, sends for Tadeshina. Astonished, she takes him to an obscure boarding-house in Kasumicho where he threatens to show Satoko's last letter (which he tore up) to Prince Toin if she does not arrange a meeting. Three days later, he returns to the boarding-house and encounters Satoko; they make love; to Tadeshina's despair, he demands another encounter.

Kiyoaki goes directly to Honda and gives a full account of everything that has happened. His friend is amazed, but supportive; not long afterwards, a visit to the district court solidifies his decision not to involve himself in the drama of other people's lives.

At this time, Chao P loses his emerald ring at the Peers School. Kri insists that it has been stolen, but the prefect forces the pair to search through 200 square yards of grass in the rain. This incident prompts them to leave the school. The Marquis Matsugae, fearing that they will leave Japan with unpleasant memories, asks them not to return to Siam immediately but to join his family at their holiday villa at Kamakura for the summer. It is there that the subject of reincarnation is brought up for the first time, in conversations between Kri, Chao P, Honda and Kiyoaki. The liaison between Kiyoaki and Satoko is maintained by Honda, who arranges for a Ford Model T to transport Satoko between Tokyo and Kamakura in secret. Kiyoaki has a third major prophetic dream.

The Thai princes receive a letter informing them of the death of Ying Chan by illness. Devastated, they return to Siam a week later.

=== Discovery ===
Tadeshina learns from the Matsugaes' steward that Kiyoaki does not possess Satoko's last letter, but continues to cover for them. In October, she realises that Satoko is pregnant, a fact they both hide from Kiyoaki. At the restaurant of the Mitsukoshi department store, they inform him that there can be no further contact. Kiyoaki and Honda, while discussing this, stumble across another bad omen: a dead mole on the path in front of them. Kiyoaki picks it up and throws it in a pond.

After a long period of no news, Kiyoaki is summoned to the billiard-room by his father. Tadeshina has attempted suicide, leaving a confidential note to the Marquis revealing the affair to him. At first, the Marquis talks calmly, but when Kiyoaki is unapologetic he beats his son with his billiard-cue. Kiyoaki is rescued by his grandmother; the household immediately starts to focus on limiting the damage.

Count Ayakura is strongly tempted to punish Tadeshina, but she knows too much about his secret resentment of the upstart Matsugaes, and he cannot afford to give her any encouragement to reveal it—in particular, the instruction he gave her (in 1905) that Satoko should lose her virginity before any bridegroom chosen by the Marquis should touch her.

The Marquis Matsugae meets Count Ayakura and they arrange an abortion for Satoko in Osaka. On the way back to Tokyo, Satoko and her mother stop at the Gesshu Temple to see the Abbess. Satoko slips away and hides from her mother, who later discovers that she has cut off her hair and resolved to become a nun. The Abbess, who suspects that a plot against the Emperor is unfolding, hopes to thwart it by shielding Satoko. Baffled as to what to do, the weak-willed Countess returns to Tokyo for help. But neither the Count nor the Marquis succeed at removing Satoko from the convent.

=== Final events ===
The betrothal is cancelled with a forged medical certificate, backdated a month, declaring Satoko to be mentally ill. In February 1914, Honda gives Kiyoaki money to travel to the convent in an effort to meet Satoko. He turns up at the front door repeatedly but is always rebuffed, and his health declines as he forces himself to trudge through the snow from the inn in Obitoke to the convent and back again as a form of penance. Eventually Honda comes looking for him after receiving a telegram, and is shocked to see how ill he is; concluding that a meeting with Satoko is vital, he goes to the convent alone on February 27, but the Abbess firmly refuses to allow any such meeting, and on the same night Honda and Kiyoaki leave for Tokyo.

During the train journey, the deathly sick Kiyoaki tells Honda: "Just now I had a dream. I'll see you again. I know it. Beneath the falls." He has written a note to his mother, asking her to give Honda his dream-diary. Two days after his return, on 2 March 1914, Kiyoaki dies at the age of 20.

== Characters ==
Major characters

- Kiyoaki "Kiyo" Matsugae (1895–1914)
- The Marquis and Marquise Matsugae
- The former Marquise Matsugae, Kiyo's grandmother
- Satoko Ayakura (b. 1893)
- The Count and Countess Ayakura
- Shigekuni Honda (b. 1895)
- Mr. and Mrs. Honda
- Shigeyuki Iinuma
- Mine, a maid
- Yamada, the steward
- Tadeshina, Satoko's maid
- Baron and Baroness Shinkawa
- The Abbess of Gesshu, Satoko's great-aunt
- Prince Haruhisa Toin and his wife (the Toinnomiyas)
- Prince Harunobu Toin, his third son
- Prince Kridsada "Kri"
- Prince Pattanadid "Chao Praong"

Minor characters

- Emperor Meiji
- Princess Kasuga
- Dr. Mori
- Dr. Ozu
- Mr. Kitazaki, innkeeper
- Itsui, the friend of Honda who owns the car
- Mr Mori the driver
- Fusako, Honda's second cousin
- Tomi Masuda, Hidé, and Matsukichi Hijikata, involved in the court case
- "The Monster", the deformed son of a marquis
- a school prefect

== Reception ==
A writer for Kirkus Reviews wrote, "Mishima's novel begins slowly but picks up momentum in the second half along with episodes of sly humor as well as the tragedy of its finale." In The New York Times, Hortense Calisher stated that Spring Snow is praiseworthy for "its marvelous incidentals, graphic and philosophic, and for its scene-gazing [...] no doubt partially researched, but the author's vitality and native omniscience are triumphant." Charles Solomon wrote in 1990 that "the four novels remain one of the outstanding works of 20th-Century literature and a summary of the author’s life and work."

In 2014, Yasser Nasser of The Bubble lauded Spring Snow as easily the best of the Sea of Fertility tetralogy, as well as "one of those novels of the last century that is almost perfectly written, capturing a sense of tragedy that Japanese literature has always been so wont to do. [...] Mishima manages to deftly avoid any entanglement in the melodramatic." Nasser said the book is tonally consistent and that the novelist sticks to narrative "without getting lost in dream-like descriptions" like Yasunari Kawabata. A writer for The Quill stated that in Spring Snow Mishima "shows the sheer beauty and power that Japanese poetry can carry", and the reviewer described a speech about changing history as "perhaps [...] comparable to Shakespeare's 'To be, or not to be'" soliloquy. In 2014, the novel was ranked in The Telegraph as one of the 10 all-time greatest Asian novels.

The David Bowie song 'Heat' from The Next Day (2013) makes reference to the dog scene from the book in the song's opening.

== References to other works ==
- The screen in Kiyoaki's bedroom has poems by Han Shan (ch. 5)
- The kabuki plays that the five watch at the Imperial Theatre, near Hibiya Park in Tokyo, are Lion Dance (about two rival generals of the Kamakura period) and The Rise and Fall of the Taira (ch. 8)
- Iinuma's favourite books in the library include the works of Han Fei, the Testament of Seiken of Asami Keisai (1652-1711), The Eighteen Histories, and Commentaries on the Four Classics; also, a poem by Kayo Honen called Song of a Noble Heart (ch. 14)
- The Marquise talks about how she played The Green of the Pines on the piano while accompanied by a koto and shamisen (ch. 18)
- While very young, Kiyoaki and Satoko copied verses from the "Okura One Hundred Poets" (Japanese Ogura Hyakunin Isshu) card-game into an album: the poems by Minamoto no Shigeyuki and Onakatomi no Yoshinobu (ch. 24)
- Chao P tells a story from the Jataka (ch. 33)
- Honda listens to the Abbess talk about The Thirty Verses and The Providence of the Greater Vehicle by Asanga (ch. 54)
- Another son of a marquis, called the Monster because of his facial and physical defects, is shown as frequently carrying a book by Giacomo Leopardi (ch. 48)
- The dream and reincarnation themes of Hamamatsu Chūnagon Monogatari inspired Spring Snow, and a former teacher of Mishima's had recently released an edition of Hamamatsu as Mishima began work on Spring Snow.
- Honda reads Ikki Kita's The Theory of Japan's National Polity and Pure Socialism (国体論及び純正社会主義 Kokutairon oyobi Junsei Shakaishugi) but cannot relate to the author's strong feelings.

== Notes ==
- Until shortly after World War II, Japanese people generally reckoned age by number of different years lived in rather than by birthdays. So Kiyoaki and Honda were born in 1895 and Satoko in 1893.

== Adaptations ==
- Spring Snow was made into a Japanese-language film, directed by Isao Yukisada, in 2005. Part of the movie was filmed at the temple of Enshō-ji, the real-life model for the book's Gesshu-ji.

Shortly afterwards it was announced that it would be adapted for manga by Riyoko Ikeda and serialised in the women's magazine Shukan Josei.
