= Miho no Matsubara =

Japanese park

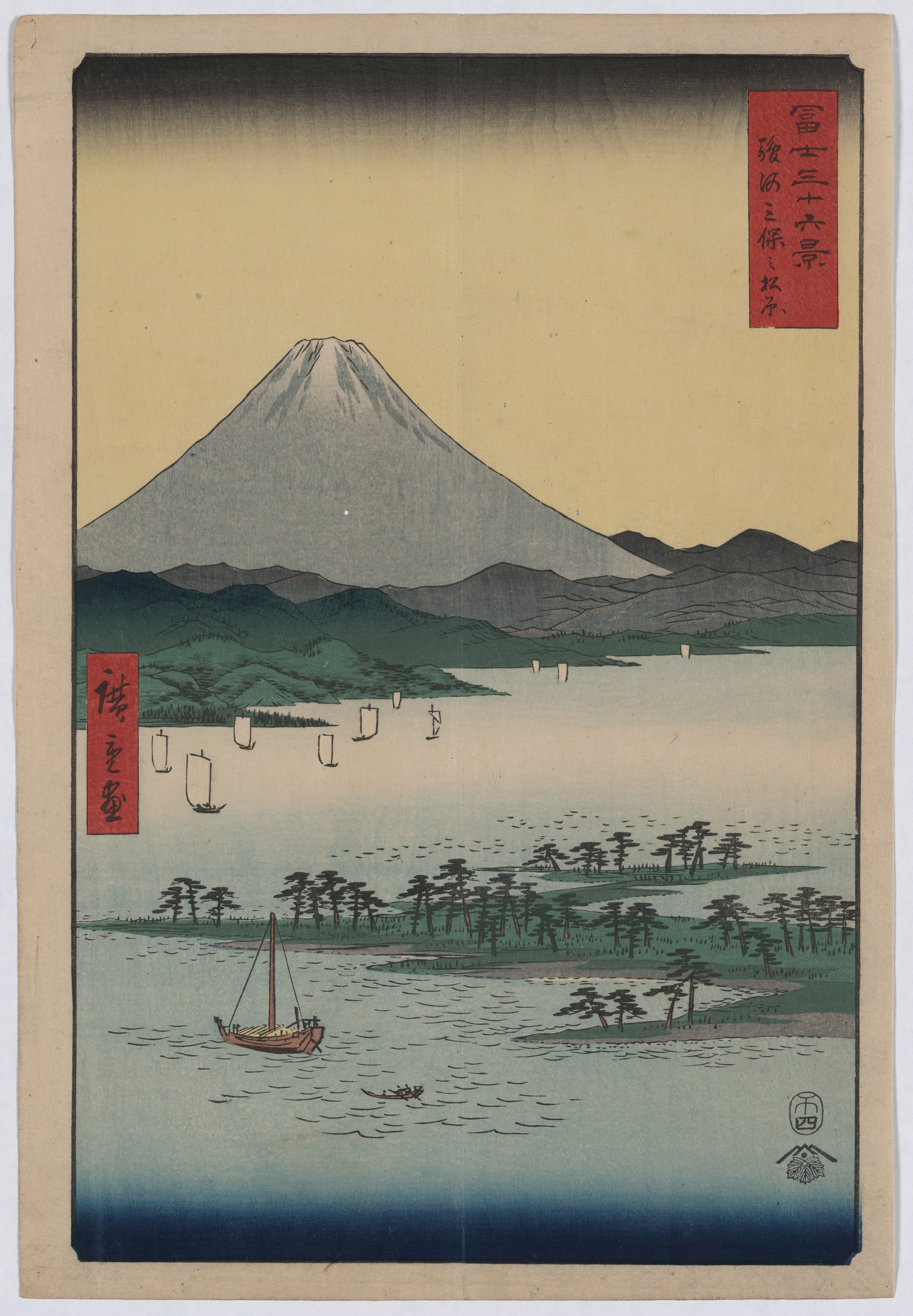
- Hiroshige's ukiyo-e woodblock print of Miho no Matsubara

- Location within Shizuoka Prefecture Location within Japan
- Location: Shimizu-ku, Shizuoka, Japan
- Coordinates: 34°59′42″N 138°31′22″E
- Established: 2013

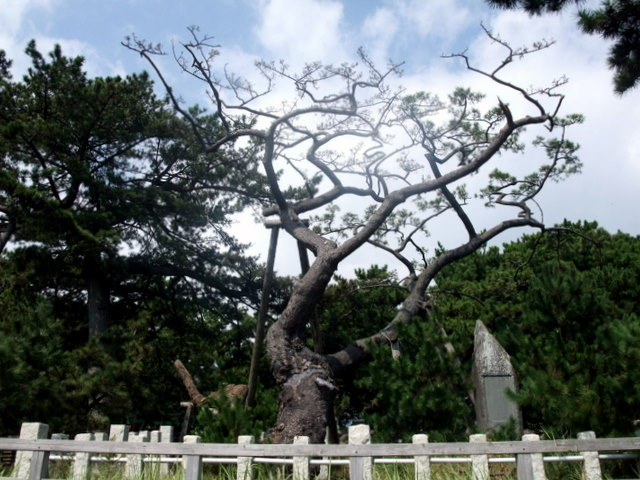
Hagoromo no Matsu where it is said the angel floated

Miho no Matsubara (三保の松原, Pinery of Miho, Pine grove at Miho) is a scenic area on the Miho Peninsula in Shimizu Ward of Shizuoka City, Japan. Its seven-kilometre seashore is lined with pine trees. It is the location of the legend upon which the Noh drama Hagoromo is based; on the second Saturday and Sunday of October, the city of Shizuoka holds a Hagoromo Festival and a performance of the Noh drama takes place near the pine tree of the legend.

It was designated as a National Places of Scenic Beauty of Japan in 1922. In 2013 the pine groves were added to the World Heritage List as part of the Fujisan Cultural Site.

== Overview ==
Miho no Matsubara is renowned as a seashore with green pine trees and sand spanning over seven kilometers. It has a great scenic view of Mount Fuji and the Izu Peninsula across Suruga Bay. Due to its natural environment, it is designated as one of New Three Views of Japan (新日本三景, Shin Nihon Sankei) along with its three pine groves. Additionally, it has been selected as one of the top 100 white sand beaches and green pine groves of Japan. It has an old pine tree dating back 650 years called Hagoromo no Matsu and is said to be where the angel wearing a Hagoromo floated down. The Miho shrine nearby preserves a piece of her plumage.

Miho no Matsubara is known as the site of the legend of Hagoromo ("The Feathered Robe"), which is based on the traditional swan maiden motif. The story of Hagoromo concerns a celestial being flying over Miho no Matsubara who was overcome by the beauty of the white sands, green pines, and sparkling water. She removed her feathered robe and hung it over a pine tree before bathing in the beautiful waters. A fisherman named Hakuryo was walking along the beach and saw the angel. He took her robe and refused to return it until she performed a heavenly dance for him. As the angel could not return to heaven without her robe, she complied with Hakuryo's request. She danced in the spring twilight and returned to heaven in the light of the full moon leaving Hakuryo looking longingly after her. (See Arthur Waley, Hagoromo. The No Plays of Japan. New York: Alfred A. Knopf, 1922.) A statue of Hakuryo watching the dance is at the entrance to the park.

On the second Saturday and Sunday of October, the city of Shizuoka holds a Hagoromo Festival near the site of the old pine tree. The Noh play Hagoromo is performed by firelight (Takigi Noh) and also creative dances in honor of the French ballet dancer Hélène Giuglaris are performed. Giuglaris (1916–1951) loved the story of Hagoromo very much but never saw the Noh performance, nor did she visit Miho during her lifetime. Nonetheless, her dying wish was, "Bury my hair near the Hagoromo pine tree at Mihonomatsubara beach". Above the Mihonomatsubara beach, overlooking the pine tree and the sea, is a monument to Giuglaris, and a lock of her hair lies beneath it. The monument shows Giuglaris holding a Noh mask, and below her figure is a poem written by her husband, Marcel Giuglaris, who visited Miho four months after Elene's death with a lock of hair and her dance costume

    English translation (anonymous):
             The wind of Miho's
             Breaking waves
             Speaks of She in Paris
             Whose life Hagoromo took away.
             If I listen, my days
             Will take flight.

== Present ==
While Miho no Matsubara still has a large, sandy beach, its sands are now uniformly black, perhaps from the volcanic rock that first formed the peninsula. One local resident's story is that the Abe River provided the white sand that made Miho such a scenic spot. During construction of the nearby Shinkansen line, too much of the Abe River's white sand was used. Over time, the sea swept away the layers of white sand and no new sand was available to replenish the sand carried out to sea, leaving behind the black volcanic sand.

== See also ==
- List of Places of Scenic Beauty of Japan (Shizuoka)

== Gallery ==
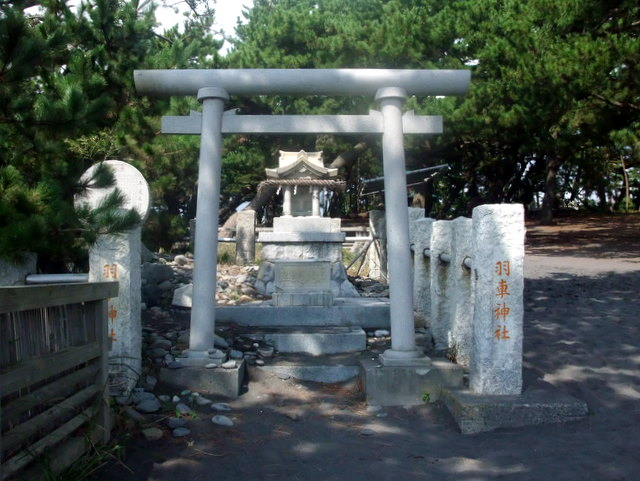
Haguruma shrine standing by Hagoromo no Matsu

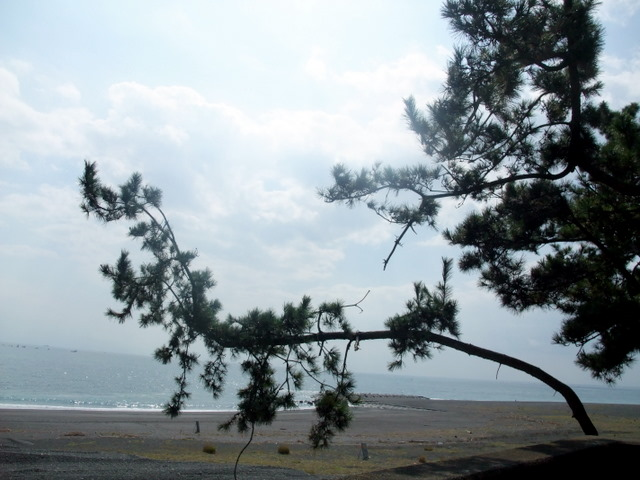
The view of Miho no Matsubara

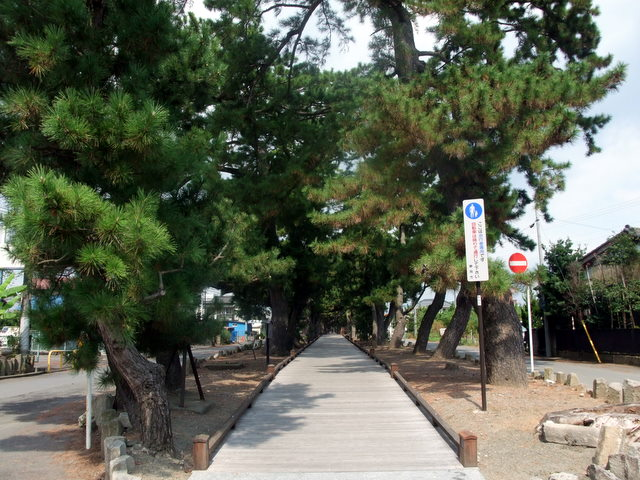
Road of God. The road to Hagoromo no Matsu from Miho shrine.

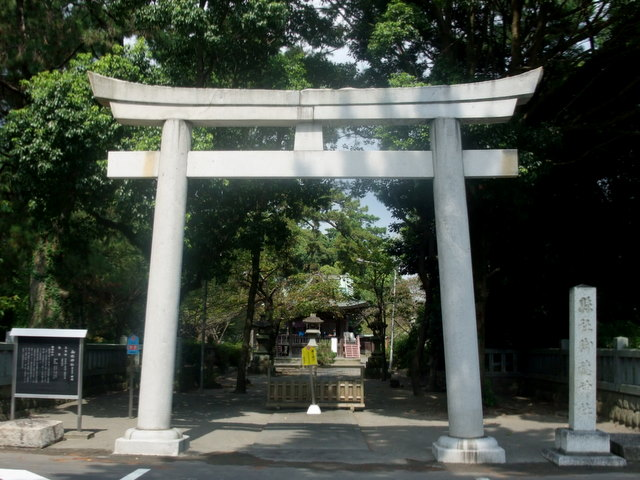
Torii of Miho shrine

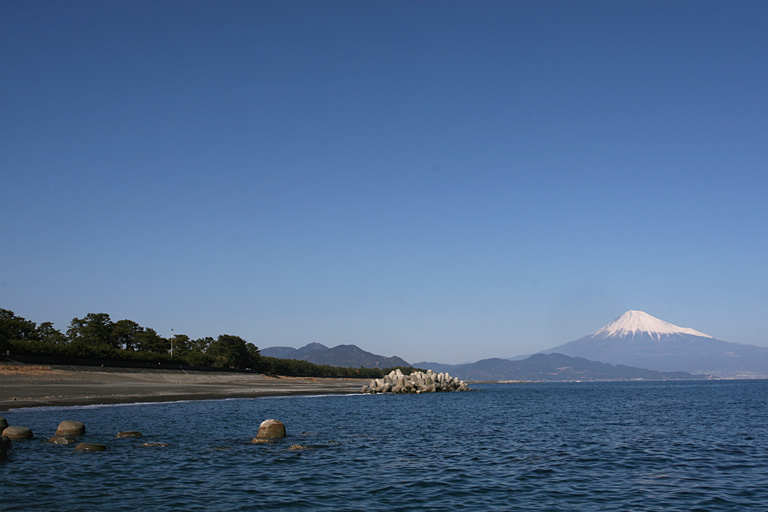
Miho no Matsubara and Mount Fuji
