= Yukio Mishima bibliography =

The bibliography of Kimitake Hiraoka, pen name Yukio Mishima, includes novels, novellas, short stories and literary essays, as well as plays that were written not only in a contemporary-style, but also in the style of classical Japanese theatre, particularly in the genres of noh and kabuki. However, although Mishima took themes, titles and characters from the noh canon, he included his own twists and modern settings, such as hospitals and ballrooms, which startled audiences who were accustomed to the long-settled originals.

In total, Mishima wrote 34 novels (including some entertainment novels), about 50 plays, 25 books of short stories, and at least 35 books of essays, one libretto, as well as one film.

An asterisk (*) denotes works written in Mishima's Gakushūin period. This article was completed with reference to the Japanese Wikipedia entry of Mishima. For a full list of his works, see work by Yamazaki in the further reading.

== Novels ==
- Tōzoku (盗賊 Thieves), 1948
  - Tōzoku―Dai 1-Shō Monogatari no Hottan (Koi no Shūkyoku soshite Monogatari no Hottan) (盗賊 第1章 物語の発端 (恋の終局そして物語の発端) Thieves―Chapter 1 Beginning of a Story （End of Love, and The Beginning of a Story）) 1948
  - Tōzoku―Dai 2-Shō Kesshin to sono Fushigina Kōka (Jisatsu Kitosha) (盗賊 第2章 決心とその不思議な効果 (自殺企画者) Thieves―Chapter 2 Determination and The Mysterious Effect （Suicide Planner）) 1947
  - Tōzoku―Dai 3-Shō Deai (盗賊 第3章 出会 Thieves―Chapter 3 Encounter) 1948
  - Tōzoku―Dai 4-Shō Shūto na Kyōbō―Jō (Biteki Seikatsusha) (盗賊 第4章 周到な共謀―上 (美的生活者) Thieves―Chapter 4 Careful Conspiracy―upper (One Who Lives Beauty) ) 1948
  - Tōzoku―Dai 5-Shō Shūto na Kyōbō―Ge (Karei) (盗賊 第5章 周到な共謀―下 (嘉例) Thieves―Chapter 5 Careful Conspiracy―second (An Auspicious Occasion)) 1948
  - Tōzoku―Dai 6-Shō Jikkō―Mijikaki Daidanen (盗賊 第6章 実行―短き大団円 Thieves―Chapter 6 Practice―Short Grand finale) 1948
- Kamen no Kokuhaku (仮面の告白 Confessions of a Mask), 1949
- Ai no Kawaki (愛の渇き Thirst for Love), 1950
- Junpaku no Yoru (純白の夜 Pure White Nights), 1950
- Ao no Jidai (青の時代 The Age of Blue), 1950
- Natsuko no Bōken (夏子の冒険 Natsuko's Adventure), 1951
- Nippon-sei (につぽん製 Made in Japan), 1952-1953
- Kinjiki (禁色 Forbidden Colors)
  - Kinjiki (禁色 Forbidden Colors), 1951
  - Higyō (秘楽 Secret Pleasure), 1953
- Koi no Miyako (恋の都 The Capital of Love), 1954
- Shiosai (潮騒 The Sound of Waves), 1954
- Megami (女神 Goddess), 1954-1955
- Shizumeru Taki (沈める滝 The Sunken Waterfall), 1955
- Kōfukugō Shuppan (幸福号出帆 The S.S. Happiness Sets Sail), 1955（Book Published in 1956）
- Kinkaku-ji (金閣寺 The Temple of the Golden Pavilion), 1956
- Nagasugita Haru (永すぎた春 Too Much of Spring), 1956
- Bitoku no Yoromeki (美徳のよろめき The Misstepping of Virtue), 1957
- Kyōko no Ie (鏡子の家 Kyoko's House), 1959
  - Kyōko no Ie Dai-1 bu (鏡子の家 第一部 Kyoko's House, pt. 1)
  - Kyōko no Ie Dai-2 bu (鏡子の家 第二部 Kyoko's House, pt. 2)
- Utage no Ato (宴のあと After the Banquet), 1960
- Ojōsan (お嬢さん The Mademoiselle), 1960
- Kemono no Tawamure (獣の戯れ The Frolic of the Beasts), 1961
- Utsukushii Hoshi (美しい星 Beautiful Star), 1962
- Ai no Shissō (愛の疾走 Dash of Love), 1963
- Gogo no Eikō (午後の曳航 The Sailor Who Fell from Grace with the Sea), 1963
- Nikutai no Gakkō (肉体の学校 The School of Flesh), 1963（Book Published in 1964）
- Kinu to Meisatsu (絹と明察 Silk and Insight), 1964
- Ongaku (音楽 The Music), 1964
- Fukuzatsuna Kare (複雑な彼 That Complicated Guy), 1966
- Yakaifuku (夜会服 Evening Dress), 1967
- Mishima Yukio Letter Kyōshitsu (三島由紀夫レター教室 Letters―Yukio Mishima's Letter Lessons), 1967-1968
- Inochi Urimasu (命売ります Life for Sale), 1968
- Hōjō no Umi (豊饒の海 The Sea of Fertility tetralogy)
  - Haru no Yuki (春の雪 Spring Snow), 1965-1967（Book Published in 1969）
  - Honba (奔馬 Runaway Horses), 1967-1968（Book Published in 1969）
  - Akatsuki no Tera (暁の寺 The Temple of Dawn), 1968-1970（Book Published in 1970）
  - Tennin Gosui (天人五衰 The Decay of the Angel), 1970-1971（Book Published in 1971）

== Short stories ==
- Sukanpo―Akihiko no osanaki omoide (酸模―秋彦の幼き思ひ出 Sorrel Flowers—Akihiko's Memory of the Early Childhood), 1938 *
- Zazen Monogatari (座禅物語 Tale of Zazen), 1938 *
- Hakamairi (墓参り Grave Visit), 1938, part of the 鈴鹿鈔 series *
- Gyōshō Seika (暁鐘聖歌 Hymn of the Dawn Bell), 1938, part of the「鈴鹿鈔」series *
- Yakata (館 Mansion), 1939, an unfinished and unpublished Short Story *
- Kokoro no Kagayaki (心のかゞやき Glow of the Heart), 1940, unfinished *
- Koguma no Hanashi (仔熊の話 Story of the Bear Cub), 1940 *
- Shinkan (神官 Shinkan), 1940 *
- Damie-garasu (彩絵硝子 Colored Picture Glass), 1940 *
- Hanazakari no Mori (花ざかりの森 The Forest in Full Bloom), 1941（Book Published in 1944）*
- Aokakiyama no Monogatari (青垣山の物語 Tale of Mount Aokakiyama), 1942 *
- Ottō to Maya (苧菟と瑪耶 Ottō and Maya), 1942 *
- Minomo no Tsuki (みのもの月 The Reflection of the Moon), 1942 *
- Tamakiharu (玉刻春 Tamakiharu), 1942 *
- Yoyo ni Nokosan (世々に残さん For Posterity), 1943 *
- Inori no Nikki (祈りの日記 Diary of Prayers), 1943 *
- Mandara Monogatari (曼荼羅物語 Tale of Mandara), 1943 *
- Hiougi (檜扇 Hiougi), 1944 *
- Asakura (朝倉 Asakura), 1944 *
- Yoru no Kuruma (夜の車 A Car in the Night), 1944
  - Title changed to Chusei ni okeru Ichi Satsujin-Jōshūsha no nokoseru Tetsugakuteki Nikki no Bassui (中世に於ける一殺人常習者の遺せる哲学的日記の抜粋 Philosophical Diary of a Serial Killer from Middle Ages)
- Esugai no Kari (エスガイの狩 Esugai's Hunting), 1945
- Chūsei (中世 The Middle Ages), 1945
- Kurojima no Ō no Monogatari no Ichibamen (黒島の王の物語の一場面 A Scene from the Tale of the King of Kurojima Island), 1945
- Ayame no Mae (菖蒲前 In Front of the Iris), 1945
- Nise Don Fan Ki (贋ドン・ファン記 Tale of the Fake Don Juan), 1946
- Tabako (煙草 Cigarette), 1946
- Misaki nite no Monogatari (岬にての物語 A Story at the Cape), 1946
- Koi to Betsuri to (恋と別離と Love, and Parting), 1947
- Karu no Miko to Sotoori Hime (軽王子と衣通姫 Prince Karu and Princess Sotoori), 1947
- Karasu (鴉 The Crow), 1947
- Yoru no Shitaku (夜の仕度 Preparations for the Evening), 1947 (Book Published in 1948)
- Raudo Supika (ラウドスピーカー Loudspeaker), 1947
- Haruko (春子 Haruko), 1947
- Sakasu (サーカス The Circus), 1948
- Futoku (婦徳 Feminine Virtues), 1948
- Zeppun (接吻 The Kiss), 1948
- Densetsu (伝説 The Legend), 1948
- Hakuchō (白鳥 Swan), 1948
- Tetsugaku (哲学 Philosophy), 1948
- Chōchō (蝶々 The Butterfly), 1948
- Junkyō (殉教 Martyrdom), 1948
- Shinsetsu na Otoko (親切な男 The Kind Man), 1948
- Kazoku Awase (家族合せ Family Card Game), 1948
- Ningen Kigeki (人間喜劇 The Human Comedy), 1948
- Kashiramoji (頭文字 Initials), 1948
- Jizen (慈善 Charity), 1948
- Hōseki Baibai (宝石売買 Precious Stone Broker), 1948
- Tsumibito (罪びと The Offender), 1948
- Kōshoku (好色 Sensuality), 1948
- Fujitsu na Yogasa (不実な洋傘 The Unfaithful Umbrella), 1948
- Yagi no Kubi (山羊の首 A Goat's Head), 1948
- Shishi (獅子 Lion), 1948
- Kōfuku to iu Byōki no Ryōhō (幸福といふ病気の療法 Treatment for the Sickness named Happiness), 1949
- Koi no Omoni (恋重荷 The Heavy Burden of Love), 1949
- Dokuyaku no Shakaiteki Kōyō ni Tsuite (毒薬の社会的効用についてOn the Social Utility of Poison), 1949
- Daijin (大臣 The Cabinet Minister), 1949
- Magun no Tsūka (魔群の通過 Passing of a Host of Devils), 1949
- Jidō (侍童 Page), 1949
- Tengoku ni Musubu Koi (天国に結ぶ恋 Love Ordained in Heaven), 1949
- Fuin (訃音 Obituary), 1949
- Butaigeiko (舞台稽古 Stage Rehearsal), 1949
- Hoshi (星 The Star), 1949
- Bara (薔薇 The Rose), 1949
- Taikutsu na Tabi (退屈な旅 Boring Journey), 1949
- Shinsetsu na Kikai (親切な機械 The Polite Machine), 1949
- Kōkyō (孝経 The Book of Filial Piety), 1949
- Kazan no Kyūka (火山の休暇 Volcano Vacation), 1949
- Kaibutsu (怪物 The Monster), 1949
- Hanayama-in (花山院 Hanayama Temple) 1950,
- Kajitsu (果実 Fruits), 1950
- Enō (鴛鴦 The Mandarin Ducks), 1950
- Shugaku Ryokō (修学旅行 Field Trip), 1950
- Nichiyōbi (日曜日 Sunday), 1950
- Tōnori-kai (遠乗会 Long Distance Riding Club), 1950 （Book Published in 1951）
- Kokei Monmon (孤閨悶々 Alone and Yearning), 1950
- Nisshoku (日食 Solar Eclipse), 1950
- Kuidōraku (食道楽 Gluttony), 1950
- Mesu-inu (牝犬 A Female Dog), 1950
- Joryū Risshiden (女流立志伝 The Story of a Successful Woman), 1951
- Katei Saiban (家庭裁判 Family Litigation), 1951
- Idai na Shimai (偉大な姉妹 The Remarkable Sisters), 1951
- Hakone-Zaiku (箱根細工 Hakone-Work), 1951
- Isu (椅子 The Chair), 1951
- Shi no Shima (死の島 Island of Death), 1951
- Tsubasa (翼 Wings), 1951
- Migi Ryoshū Tsukamatsuri Sōrō (右領収仕候 Paid in Full), 1951
- Tenagahime (手長姫 The Long-Armed Princess), 1951
- Asagao (朝顔 Morning Glory), 1951
- Keitaiyō (携帯用 Portable), 1951
- Rikyū no Matsu (離宮の松 The Pinetree on the Palace Grounds), 1951
- Kurosu-Wado-Pazuru (クロスワード・パズル Crossword Puzzle), 1952
- Gakusei Kabuki Katagi (学生歌舞伎気質 The Temperament of the Student Kabuki), 1952
- Kinsei Shūtome Katagi (近世姑気質 The Temperament of the Early Modern Mother-in-Law), 1952
- Kingyo to Okusama (金魚と奥様 Goldfish and Madam), 1952
- Manatsu no Shi (真夏の死 Death in Midsummer), 1952
- Futari no Roujō (二人の老嬢 Two Old Maids), 1952
- Bishin (美神 Goddess of Beauty), 1952
- Eguchi Hatsu-jo Oboegaki (江口初女覚書 Memorabilia of Eguchi Hatsu), 1953
- Hina no Yado (雛の宿 The House of Dolls), 1953
- Tabi no Bohimei (旅の墓碑銘 Epitaph for a Journey), 1953
- Kyū-teisha (急停車 A Sudden Stop), 1953
- Tamago (卵 Eggs, Tamago), 1953
- Fuman na Onnatachi (不満な女たち Unsatisfied Women), 1953
- Hanabi (花火 Fireworks), 1953
- Radige no Shi (ラディゲの死 The Death of Radiguet), 1953
- Yōki na Koibito (陽気な恋人 The Cheerful Lover), 1953
- Hakurankai (博覧会 The Exhibition), 1954
- Geijutsu Gitsune (芸術狐 Pseudo Art), 1954
- Kagi no Kakaru Heya (鍵のかかる部屋 A Room to be locked), 1954
- Fukushū (復讐 Revenge), 1954
- Shi o Kaku Shōnen (詩を書く少年 The Boy Who Wrote Poetry), 1954 （Book Published in 1956）
- Shigadera Shōnin no Koi (志賀寺上人の恋 The Priest of Shiga Temple and His Love), 1954
- Mizuoto (水音 The Sound of Water), 1954
- S・O・S, 1954
- Umi to Yuyake (海と夕焼 Sea and Sunset), 1955
- Shimbun-gami (新聞紙 Swaddling Clothes), 1955
- Akinai-bito (商ひ人 The Shopkeeper), 1955
- Yama no Tamashii (山の魂 The Spirit of the Mountain), 1955
- Yane o Ayumu (屋根を歩む Walking on the Roof), 1955
- Botan (牡丹Peonies), 1955
- Aoi Dotera (青いどてら The Blue Padded Kimono), 1956
- Jūkyu-sai (十九歳 Nineteen Years Old), 1956
- Ashi no Seiza (足の星座 Foot Constellation), 1956
- Segaki-bune (施餓鬼舟 The Requiem Boat), 1956
- Hashi-zukushi (橋づくし The Seven Bridges), 1956
- Onnagata, (女方 Onnagata), 1957
- Irogonomi no Miya (色好みの宮 The Palace of Sensuality), 1957
- Kiken (貴顕 The Dignitary), 1957
- Kage (影 The Shadow), 1959
- Hyakuman-en Senbei (百万円煎餅 Three Million Yen), 1960
- Ai no Shokei (愛の処刑 Love's Penance), 1960
- Sutā (スタア Star), 1960
- Yūkoku (憂國 Patriotism), 1960
- Ichigo (苺 Strawberry), 1961
- Bōshi no Hana (帽子の花 The Flower Hat), 1962
- Mahōbin (魔法瓶 Thermos Flasks), 1962
- Tsuki (月 Moon), 1962
- Budōpan (葡萄パン Raisin Bread), 1963
- Shinju (真珠 The Pearl), 1963
- Jidōsha (自動車 Cars), 1963
- Kawaisō na Papa (可哀さうなパパ Poor Papa), 1963
- Ame no naka no funsui (雨のなかの噴水 Fountains in the Rain), 1963
- Kippu (切符 Tickets), 1963
- Ken (剣 Sword), 1963
- Gettan-sō Kitan (月澹荘奇譚 The Strange Tale of Shimmering Moon Villa), 1965
- Mikumano Mōde (三熊野詣 Acts of Worship), 1965
- Kujaku (孔雀 The Peacocks), 1965
- Asa no Jun'ai (朝の純愛 True Love at Dawn), 1965
- Nakama (仲間 Companions), 1966
- Eirei no Koe (英霊の聲 Voices of the Fallen Heroes), 1966
- Kōya yori (荒野より From the Wilderness), 1966
- Tokei (時計 Clock), 1967
- Ranryō-ō (蘭陵王 The Dragon Flute), 1969

=== Short story collections ===
- Hanazakari no Mori (花ざかりの森 The Forest in Full Bloom), 1944
- Misaki nite no Monogatari (岬にての物語 A Story at the Cape), 1947
- Yoru no Shitaku (夜の仕度 Preparations for the Evening), 1948
- Magun no Tsūka (魔群の通過 Passing of a Host of Devils), 1949
- Kaibutsu (怪物 The Monster), 1950
- Manatsu no Shi (真夏の死 Death in Midsummer and other stories), 1953 — includes Patriotism
- Hashi-zukushi (橋づくし The Seven Bridges), 1958
- Sutā (スタア Star), 1961
- Mikumano Mōde (三熊野詣 Acts of Worship), 1965

== Plays ==
=== Shingeki ===
- Higashi no Hakase tachi (東の博士たち Magi of the East), 1939 *
- Rotei (路程 The Journey), 1939, unpublished *
- Kirusuto Koutanki (基督降誕記 The Birth of Christ), 1939 *
- Yakata (館 The Mansion), 1939, unfinished *
- Yagatemi Date to (やがてみ楯と To Become the Shield), 1943 *
- Ayame (あやめ Iris), 1948
- Kataku (火宅 Burning House), 1948
- Ai no Fuan (愛の不安 The Anxiety of Love), 1949
- Tōdai (灯台 The Lighthouse), 1949
- Niobe (ニオベ Niobe), 1949
- Seijo (聖女 The Holy Woman), 1949
- Majinreihai (魔神礼拝 Adoration of the Devil), 1950
- Koi ni Natta Oshōsan (鯉になつた和尚さん The Monk Who Became a Koi), 1951
- Shinshi (紳士 The Gentleman), 1952, silent play
- Tada Hodo Takai Mono wa Nai (只ほど高いものはない Nothing is as Expensive as Gratis), 1952
- Yoro no Himawari (夜の向日葵 Twilight Sunflower), 1953
- Wakodo yo Yomigaere (若人よ蘇れ Arise, Youth!), 1954
- Bokushingu (ボクシング Boxing), 1954
- Koi niwa Nanatsu no Kagi ga Aru (恋には七ツの鍵がある There Are Seven Keys to Love), 1955
- Sangenshoku (三原色 Primary Colors), 1955
- Fune no Aisatsu (船の挨拶 Greetings at the Boat), 1955
- Shiroari no Su (白蟻の巣 Termites' Nest), 1955
- Daishōgai (大障碍 Steeplechase), 1956
- Rokumeikan (鹿鳴館 Rokumeikan), 1956
- Asa no Tsutsuji (朝の躑躅 Morning Azalea), 1957
- Bara to Kaizoku (薔薇と海賊 Roses and Pirates), 1958
- Onna wa Senryo Sarenai (女は占領されない Women Never Be Captured), 1959
- Nettaiju (熱帯樹 Tropical Tree: A Tragedy in Three Acts), 1960
- Toka no Kiku (十日の菊 Tenth-Day Chrysanthemums or The Day after the Fair), 1961
- Kuro-tokage (黒蜥蜴 The Black Lizard), 1961
- Yorokobi no Koto (喜びの琴 The Harp of Joy), 1964
- Koi no Hokage (恋の帆影 The Sails of Love), 1964
- Sado Kōshaku Fujin (サド侯爵夫人 Madame de Sade), 1965
- Shitakiri Suzume (舌切雀 Tongue-cut Sparrow), 1965
- Suzaku-ke no Metsubō (朱雀家の滅亡 The Decline and Fall of the Suzaku), 1967
- Waga Tomo Hittorā (わが友ヒットラー My Friend Hitler), 1968
- Raiō no Terasu (癩王のテラス The Terrace of The Leper King), 1969

=== Modern noh plays ===
Kindai Nōgaku shu (近代能楽集 Modern Nō Plays)

- Kantan (邯鄲 The Magic Pillow), 1950
- Aya no Tsuzumi (綾の鼓 The Damask Drum), 1951
- Sotoba Komachi (卒塔婆小町 Komachi at the Stupa or Komachi at the Gravepost), 1952
- Aoi no Ue (葵上 The Lady Aoi), 1954
- Hanjo (班女 The Waiting Lady with the Fan), 1955
- Dōjōji (道成寺 Dōjō Temple), 1957
- Yuya, (熊野 Yuya), 1959
- Yoroboshi (弱法師 The Begging Monk or The Blind Young Man), 1960
- Genji Kuyō, (源氏供養 Memorial Service of Prince Genji), 1962
- Busu (附子 Busu), a Modern Kyogen play written in 1957, published in 1971, but was never performed professionally.
- Long After Love (Long After Love), a compilation of other Modern Noh plays for performance in New York, written in 1957, published in 1971

=== Kabuki ===
- Jigoku Hen (地獄変 Hell Screen), 1953 (based on Hell Screen, Ryūnosuke Akutagawa's short story)
- Iwashi Uri Koi Hikiami (鰯売恋曳網 The Sardine Seller's Net of Love), 1954
- Yuya (Kabuki), (熊野 (歌舞伎) Yuya (Kabuki)), 1955
- Fuyō no Tsuyu Ōuchi Jikki (芙蓉露大内実記 The Blush on the White Hibiscus Blossom: Lady Fuyo and the True Account of the Ōuchi Clan), 1955, an adaptation of Euripides' Hippolytos and Racine's Phèdre
- Musume-gonomi Obi Tori no Ike (むすめごのみ帯取池 Sash Stealing Pond), 1958
- Chinsetsu Yumiharizuki (椿説弓張月 Half Moon (like a Bow and arrow setting up): The Adventures of Tametomo or literally A Wonder Tale: The Moonbow), 1969

=== Ballet ===
- Miranda, (ミランダ Miranda), 1968

=== Libretto ===
- Minoko, (美濃子 Minoko), 1964

=== Operetta ===
- Toketa Tennyo (溶けた天女 Celestial Beauty who Melted or Angel Lady who Melted), 1954, never premiered
- Bon Dia Senyōra (ボン・ディア・セニョーラ Bon Dia Signora), 1954

=== Buyō ===
- Konkai Kikunoariake (狐会菊有明 Konkai Kikunoariake), 1944, never premiered
- Hade-kurabe Chikamatsu Musume (艶競近松娘 The Charming Figure Competition of Chikamatsu Girls), 1951
- Himegimi to Kagami (姫君と鏡 The Eldest Princess and the Mirror), 1951
- Muromachi Hangonkō (室町反魂香 The Dead Appearance Incense in Muromachi) 1953
- Hashi-zukushi (Buyō) (橋づくし (舞踊) The Seven Bridges (Buyō)), 1958

=== Translated adaptations ===
- Jean Cocteau's Orphée, 1956, Buyō adaptation
- Racine's Britannicus, 1957
- Oscar Wilde's Salome, 1960
- Goethe's Proserpina, 1962
- Puccini's Tosca, 1963
- Helen Bannerman's The Story of Little Black Sambo, 1964
- Gabriele d'Annunzio's Le Martyre de Saint Sébastien, 1965
- Victor Hugo's Ruy Blas, 1966
- Arabian Nights, 1967
- Jean Cocteau's L'Aigle à deux têtes, 1967

== Notes, autobiography, essays, diaries, and travelogues ==
- Tanuki no Shinja (狸の信者 Follower of the Racoon), 1938, part of the「鈴鹿鈔」series *
- Kannagara no Michi (惟神之道 The Way of the Gods), 1941 *
- Shibai Nikki (芝居日記 Drama Diaries), 1942 *
- Azuma Fumihiko Chōshi (東文彦 弔詞 Condolences for Fumihiko Azuma), 1943 *
- Azuma Takashi-ni o Kokusu (東徤兄を哭す Lamenting Takashi Azuma), 1943 *
- Yanagizakura Zakkenroku (柳桜雑見録 Yanagizakura Notes), 1943 *
- Hiraoka Kamitate Den (平岡公威伝 The Life of Kamitate Hiraoka), 1944 *
- Funsōkyō (扮装狂 The Costume Fanatic), 1944 *
- Haikyo no Asa (廃墟の朝 The Morning of Ruins), 1944 *
- Shiron Sonohoka (詩論その他 Poetic Theory and Others), 1945
- Wakare (別れ The Parting), 1945
- Shōwa Nijūnen Hachigatsu no Kinen ni (昭和廿年八月の記念に In Memory of August 1945), 1945
- Sengo Goroku (戦後語録 Postwar Sayings), 1945
- Kawabata Yasunari Inshōki (川端康成印象記 Impressions of Yasunari Kawabata), 1946
- Waga Sedai no Kakumei (わが世代の革命 Revolution of Our Age), 1946
- Manekarezaru Kyaku (招かれざる客 The Uninvited Guest), 1947
- Jushosha no Kyoki, (重症者の兇器 The Murder Weapon of Seriously Ill Person), 1948
- Shitei (師弟 Teacher and Student), 1948
- Tsutankāmen no Kekkon (ツタンカーメンの結婚 The Marriage of Tutankhamun), 1948
- Hanjidaiteki na Geijutsuka (反時代的な芸術家 The Artist against Our Times), 1948
- Higeki no Arika (悲劇の在処 The Whereabouts of Tragedy), 1949
- Gikyoku o Kakitagaru Sōsetsugaki no Nōto (戯曲を書きたがる小説書きのノート Notes of a Novelist Who Wants to Write Drama), 1949
- Osaka no Tsurekomiyado ―「Ai no Kawaki」no Shōsa Ryokō no Ichiya (大阪の連込宿 ――「愛の渇き」の調査旅行の一夜 Love Hotels in Osaka ― A Night of Investigation for Thirst for Love), 1950
- Kyoei no Tsuite (虚栄について On Vanity), 1950
- Koe to Kotoba Tsukai ― Dansei no Motomeru Risō no Josei (声と言葉遣ひ――男性の求める理想の女性 Servant of Voice and Words ― The Ideal Woman Desired by Men), 1950
- Kogen Hoteru (高原ホテル A Hotel in the Highlands), 1951
- Aporo no Sakazuki (アポロの杯 The Cup of Apollo), 1952, Travelogue
  - Hoku-bei Kikō (Amerika Nikki) (北米紀行 (あめりか日記) North America Travelogue (American Diary))
  - Nan-bei Kikō (San Pauro no "Hato no Machi") (南米紀行 (サン・パウロの「鳩の街」) South America Travelogue (São Paulo's "Pigeon Town"))
  - Ōshū Kikō (欧州紀行 Europe Travelogue)
  - Tabi no Omoide (旅の思ひ出 Memories of the Travel)
- Enshigan no Tabibito (遠視眼の旅人The Farsighted Traveller), 1952
- Saikō no Gizensha to Shite ― Koutaishidenka e no Tegami (最高の偽善者として――皇太子殿下への手紙 As the Finest Hypocrite ― A Letter to the Crown Prince), 1952
- Watashi no Sukina Sakuchūjinbutsu ― Girisha kara Gendai made no Nakani (私の好きな作中人物――希臘から現代までの中に My Favourite Literary Characters ― from Ancient Greece to the Present), 1952
- Tanoshiki Gokōkai o ― Kōtaishidenka e (愉しき御航海を――皇太子殿下へ Bon Voyage ― To the Crown Prince), 1953
- Zōshōshūjin no Omoide ― Boku wa Ōkuradaijin (蔵相ぞうしょう就任の想ひ出――ボクは大蔵大臣 Memories of My Inauguration as Minister ― I Am the Minister of Finance), 1953
- Dōdōnuguri no Hōrō (堂々めぐりの放浪 Roaming in Circles), 1953
- Shibai to Watashi (芝居と私 Drama and I), 1954
- Onnagirai no Ben (女ぎらひの弁 Speech of A Misogynist), 1954
- Sukina Josei (好きな女性 Women I Like), 1954
- Watashi no Shōsetsu no Hōhō (私の小説の方法 The Way I Write Novels), 1954
- Kūhaku no Yakuwari (空白の役割 The Role of Blankness), 1955
- Shūmatsukan kara no Shuppatsu ― Shōwa Nijūnen no Jigazō (終末感からの出発――昭和二十年の自画像 Departure from Apocalyptic Feelings ― Self-Portrait of 1945), 1955
- Hachigatsu Jūgonichi Zengo (八月十五日前後 Around August 15), 1955
- Gigyoku no Yūwaku (戯曲の誘惑 The Allure of Drama), 1955
- Shōsetsuka no Kyūka (小説家の休暇 The Holiday of a Novelist), 1955
- Shin Renai Kōza (新恋愛講座 New Lectures about Love), 1956
- Rekishi no Soto ni Jibun o Tazunete ― Sanjūdai no Shosei (歴史の外に自分をたづねて――三十代の処生 To Search for Oneself Outside of History ― Living in One's Thirties), 1956
- Radige ni Tsukarete ― Watashino Dokusho Henreki (ラディゲに憑かれて――私の読書遍歴 Possessed by Radiguet ― My Reading History), 1956
- Waga Manga (わが漫画 My Manga), 1956
- Waga Miseraretaru Mono (わが魅せられたるもの Those Who Enchant Me), 1956
- Jiko Kaizō no Kokoromi ― Omoi Buntai to Ōgai e no Keitō (自己改造の試み――重い文体と鴎外への傾倒 An Attempt at Self Change ― Devotion to Heavy Literary Style and Ōgai), 1956
- Bodi-biru tetsugaku (ボディ・ビル哲学 Philosophy of Bodybuilding), 1956
- Aru Gūwa (或る寓話 A Certain Fable), 1956
- Bungaku to Supōtsu (文学とスポーツ Literature and Sports), 1956
- Bokushingu to Shōsetsu (ボクシングと小説 Boxing and the Novel), 1956
- Tōsui ni Tsuite (陶酔について On Intoxication), 1956
- Waga Shishunki (わが思春期 My Adolescence), 1957
- Gakuya de kakareta Engeki-ron, (楽屋で書かれた演劇論 Backstage Essays), 1957
- Tabi no Ehon, (旅の絵本 Picture Book of a Journey), 1957 (Book Published in 1958), New York Travelogue
- Ratai to Ishō, (裸体と衣裳 Naked body and Apparel), 1959 Diary
- Gaiyū Nikki (外遊日記 Foreign Travelogue), 1958
- Fudōtoku Kyōiku Kōza (不道徳教育講座 Lectures on Immoral Education)
  - Fudōtoku Kyōiku Kōza (不道徳教育講座 Lectures on Immoral Education), 1959
  - Zoku Fudōtoku Kyōiku Kōza (続不道徳教育講座 Continued Lectures on Immoral Education), 1960
- Watashi no Miaikekkon (私の見合結婚 My Arranged Marriage), 1958
- Sakka to Kekkon (作家と結婚 Marrying an Author), 1958
- Haha o Kataru ― Watashi no Saijō no Dokusha (母を語る――私の最上の読者 Talking about Mother ― My Best Reader), 1958
- Dōjin Zakki (同人雑記 Notes on My Friends), 1958
- Jū-hachi-sai to Sanjū-yon-sai no Shōzōga (十八歳と三十四歳の肖像画 With 18 and 34 years:Two Portraits), 1959
- Boku wa Obuje ni Naritai (ぼくはオブジェになりたい I Want to Become an Object d’Art), 1959
- Yume no Genryō (夢の原料 The Ingredients of a Dream), 1960
- Paramiddo to Mayaku (ピラミッドと麻薬 Pyramids and Narcotics), 1961
- Bi ni Sakarau Mono (美に逆らふもの That Which Opposes Beauty), 1961, travelogue to the Tiger Balm Garden in Hong Kong
- Gisha e no Kyōshū (汽車への郷愁 Homesickness for Trains), 1961
- Hōritsu to Bungaku (法律と文学 Law and Literature), 1961
- Dai-ichi no Sei (第一の性 The First Sex), 1962-64
- Watashi no Henreki Jidai (私の遍歴時代 My Wandering Years), 1963 （Book Published in 1964）, autobiography
- Watashi no Naka no “Otokorashisa” no Kouhaku (私の中の“男らしさ”の告白 Confession on the "Masculinity" within Myself), 1963
- Shōsetsuka no Musuko (小説家の息子 The Son of a Novelist), 1963
- ―S・F Fan no Wagamama na Kibō (―S・Fファンのわがままな希望 ―The Self-Indulgent Wishes of a Sci-fi Fan), 1963
- Waga Sōsaku Hōhō (わが創作方法 My Creative Method), 1963
- Shashinshū「Barakei」no Moderu o Tsutomete ― Purasu・Mainasu ’63 (写真集「薔薇刑」のモデルをつとめて――ぷらす・まいなす'63 Trying My Best as Model for the Photobook Barakei ― Plus or Minus ’63), 1963
- Yume to Jinsei (夢と人生 Dream and Life), 1964
- Watashi no Shōsetsu Sakuhō (私の小説作法 My Way of Novel-writing), 1964
- Tengu Dō (天狗道 The Way of the Tengu), 1964
- Kumanoro ― Shin Nippon Meisho Annai (熊野路――新日本名所案内 Kumano Road ― Guide to a New Japanese Sight), 1964
- Shūtō Zuihitsu (秋冬随筆 Autumn and Winter Writings), 1964
- Jikkanteki Supōtsu Ron (実感的スポーツ論 A Theory of Sports Grounded in Reality), 1964
- Tōyō to Seiyō o Musubi Hi (東洋と西洋を結び火――開会式 A Flame that Ties Orient and Occident ― Opening Ceremony), 1964
- 「Wakare mo Tanoshi」no Saiden (「別れもたのし」の祭典――閉会式 Festival of “Happy Parting” ― Closing Ceremony), 1964
- Otoko no Oshiyare (男のおしやれ Men's Fashion), 1964
- Han-teijo Daigaku (反貞女大学 College of Unchasteness), 1965 （Book Published in 1966）
- Hōgakushi to Shōsetsu (法学士と小説 The Bachelor of Laws and the Novel), 1965
- Rondon Tsūshin・Igirisu Kikō (ロンドン通信・英国紀行 Communications from London・U.K. Travelogue), 1965
- Watashi no Sensō to Sengo Taigen ― Nijū Nen me no Hachigatsu Jūgo Nichi (私の戦争と戦後体験――二十年目の八月十五日, My Prewar and Postwar Experiences ― The Twentieth August 15), 1965
- Taiyō to Tetsu (太陽と鉄 Sun and Steel: Art, Action and Ritual Death), 1968, a collection of autobiographical essays.
  - F104 (エピロオグ―F104 Epilogue―F104) 1968
- Owari no bigaku (をはりの美学 Aesthetics of Ending) 1966
- 「Warera」kara no Tonsō ― Watashi no Bungaku (「われら」からの遁走――私の文学 Flight from the “We” ― My Literature), 1966
- Waga Ikujiron (わが育児論 My Theory of Childrearing), 1966
- Ni・Nirokujiken to Watashi (二・二六事件と私 The 2/26 Incident and Me), 1966
- Tōgyūshi no Bi (闘牛士の美 Beauty of the Bullfighter), 1966
- Watashi no Isho (私の遺書 My Suicide Note), 1966
- Watashi no Kirai na Hito (私のきらひな人 People I Hate), 1966
- Bītoruzu Kenbutsu Ki (ビートルズ見物記 Notes on Watching The Beatles), 1966
- Watashi no Kenkōhō ― Mazu Bodī Biru (私の健康法――まづボデービル How I Stay Healthy ― Bodybuilding First), 1966
- Nentō no Mayoi (年頭の迷ひ Lost at the Beginning of the Year), 1967
- Otoko no Bigaku (男の美学 Aesthetics of Men), 1967
- Ajisai no Haha (紫陽花の母 Hydrangea's Mother), 1967
- Ikanishite Eisei o? (いかにして永生を？Immortality, How?), 1967
- Seinen ni Tsuite (青年について On the Youth), 1967
- Indo no Inshō (インドの印象 Impressions on India), 1967
- 「Bungei Bunka」no Koro (「文芸文化」のころ Back in My Time of the Bungei Bunka), 1968
- Nihon no Koten to Watashi (日本の古典と私 Japanese Classics and Me), 1968
- Dentō no Idea ― Waga Bungaku no Yōranki (電灯のイデア――わが文学の揺籃期 Lightbulb Ideas ― The Infancy of My Literature), 1968
- Gunpuku o Kiru Otoko no Jyōken (軍服を着る男の条件 The Conditions to Wearing Military Uniform as a Man), 1968
- Gaijū no Shiseikatsu (怪獣の私生活 The Private Life of a Monster), 1968
- Hoteru (ホテル Hotel), 1969
- 「Hitokiri」Shutsuen no Ki (「人斬り」出演の記 Notes on Appearing in Hitokiri), 1969
- Gekiga ni Okeru Wakamono Ron (劇画における若者論 A Theory of Young People Regarding the Gekiga), 1970
- Koma (独楽 Spinning Top), 1970
- Aisuru to Iu Koto (愛するといふこと On Loving), 1970
- Takigahara Buntonchi wa Daini no Waga Ie (滝ヶ原分屯地は第二の我が家 Takigahara Sub-camp Is My Second Home), 1970

== Literary, art, and drama criticism ==
- Tanaka Fuyuji Shōron (田中冬二小論 Short Essay on Fuyuji Tanaka), 1940 *
- Ōchō Shinri Bungaku Shōshi (王朝心理文学小史 Concise History of Psychological Literature in the Dynastic Periods), 1942 *
- Kokon no Kisetsu (古今の季節 Past and Present Seasons), 1942 *
- Ise Monogatari no Koto (伊勢物語のこと On the Tale of Ise), 1942 *
- Uta wa Amaneshi (うたはあまねし Songs Everywhere), 1942 *
- Yumeno no Shika (夢野之鹿The Deer of Yumeno), 1943 *
- Koza no Gyokuseki ― Itō Shizuo Oboegaki (古座の玉石――伊東静雄覚書 The Gemstone of Koza ― A Memorandum on Shizuo Itō), 1944 *
- Dan Kazuo「Hanagatami」― Oboegaki (檀一雄「花筐」――覚書 Kazuo Dan’s Flower Basket ― A Memorandum), 1944 *
- Kawabata shi no「Jojōka」ni Tsuite (川端氏の「抒情歌」について On Kawabata’s Lyric Poetry), 1946
- Sōjūrō no Koto nado ― Haiyū Ron (宗十郎のことなど――俳優論 On Sōjūrō and Others ― A Theory of Actor), 1947
- Sōjūrō Oboegaki (宗十郎覚書 A Memorandum on Sōjūrō), 1947
- Sōmonka no Genryu, (相聞歌の源流 The Source of the Sōmon), 1948
- Jōshi ni Tsuite ― Yaya Kyōgeki na Giron (情死について――やゝ矯激な議論 On Double Suicide ― A Somewhat Radical Argument), 1948
- Kawabata Yasunari Ron no Ichi Hōhō ―「Sakuhin」ni Tsuite (川端康成論の一方法――「作品」について A Method from the Theory of Yasunari Kawabata ― On the “Artwork”), 1949
- Nakamura Shikan Ron (中村芝翫論 A Theory of Shikan Nakamura), 1949
- Shōsetsu no Gikō ni Tsuite (小説の技巧について On the Techniques of the Novel), 1949
- Ugetsu Monogatari ni Tsuite (雨月物語について On the Tales of Moonlight and Rain), 1949
- Goku Mijikai Shōsetsu no Kōyō (極く短かい小説の効用 The Utility of the Extremely Short Novel), 1949
- On Oscar Wilde, 1950
- Bungaku ni Okeru Haru no Mezame (文学に於ける春のめざめ, The “Spring Awakening” of Literature), 1951
- Hihyōka ni Shōsetsu ga Wakaruka (批評家に小説がわかるか Does the Critic Understand the Novel?), 1951
- Shin Koten Ha (新古典派 Neoclassicism), 1951
- Nihon no Shōsetsuka wa Naze Gigyoku o Kakanai ka? (日本の小説家はなぜ戯曲を書かないか？Why Don't Japanese Novelists Write Drama?), 1951
- Dan Kazuo no Hiai (檀一雄の悲哀 The Pathos of Kazuo Dan), 1951
- 「Hanjo」Haiken (「班女」拝見 Seeing Hanjo), 1952
- Hizoku na Buntai ni Tsuite (卑俗な文体について On Vulgar Literary Style), 1954
- Wattō no《Shiteeru e no Funade》(ワットオの《シテエルへの船出》Watteau's The Embarktion for Cythera), 1954
- Akutagawa Ryūnosuke ni Tsuite (芥川龍之介について On Ryūnosuke Akutagawa). 1954
- Yokomitsu Toshikazu to Kawabata Yasunari (横光利一と川端康成 Toshikazu Yokomitsu and Yasunari Kawabata), 1955
- Kawabata Yasunari Besuto・Surī ―「Yama no Oto」「Sorihashi Rensaku」「Kinjū」(川端康成ベスト・スリー――「山の音」「反橋連作」「禽獣」The Best Three of Yasunari Kawabata ― The Sound of the Mountain, Sorihashi Bridge Series, Of Birds and Beasts), 1955
- Geijutsu ni Erosu wa Hitsuyō ka (芸術にエロスは必要か Is Eros Necessary to Art?), 1955
- Fukuda Tsuneari shi no Kao (福田恆存氏の顔 The Face of Tsuneari Fukuda), 1955
- Katō Michio shi no Koto (加藤道夫氏のこと On Michio Katō), 1955
- Boku no Eiga o Miru Shakudo・Shinemasukōpu to Engyoku (ぼくの映画をみる尺度・シネマスコープと演劇 My Film-Watching Standards, CinemaScope, and Theatre), 1956
- Eien no Tabibito―Kawabata Yasunari-shi no Hito to Sakuhin (永遠の旅人―川端康成氏の人と作品 The Eternal Traveler―Yasunari Kawabata's Personality and Works), 1956
- Seibugeki Raisan (西部劇礼讃 In Praise of the Western Film), 1956
- Gakuya de kakareta Engeki-ron, (楽屋で書かれた演劇論 Backstage Essays), 1957
- Kawabata Yasunari no Tōyō to Seiyō (川端康成の東洋と西洋 The Orient and Occident of Yasunari Kawabata), 1957
- Gendai Shōsetsu wa Koten Tarieru ka (現代小説は古典たり得るか Can the Contemporary Novel Do the Job of Classics?), 1957
- Shinjū Ron (心中論 A Theory of Double Suicide), 1958
- Bunshō Dokuhon (文章読本 Writing Manual), 1959
- Kawabata Yasunari shi Saisetsu (川端康成氏再説 Another Explanation of Yasunari Kawabata), 1959
- Rokusei Nakamura Utaemon Josetsu (六世中村歌右衛門序説 Introduction to Nakamura Utaemon VI), 1959
- 「Erochishizumu」― Joruju・Bataiyu Cho Muro Junsuke Yaku (「エロチシズム」――ジョルジュ・バタイユ著 室淳介訳 Eroticism ― by Georges Bataille, translated by Junsuke Muro)
- Ishihara Shintarō shi no Shosakuhin (石原慎太郎氏の諸作品 The Works of Shintarō Ishihara), 1960
- Berafonte San (ベラフォンテ讃 In Praise of Belafonte), 1960
- 「Kuroi Orufe」o Mite (「黒いオルフェ」を見てOn Seeing Orfeu Negro), 1960
- Kasugai Ken shi no「Miseinen」no Jobun (春日井建氏の「未青年」の序文 Preface to Ken Kasugai's The Minor), 1960
- Takeda Taijun hi ― Sōryo de Aru Koto (武田泰淳氏――僧侶であること Taijun Takeda ― On Being a Monk), 1960
- Sonzaishinai Mono no Bigaku ―「Shinkokinshū」Chinkai (存在しないものの美学――「新古今集」珍解 The Aesthetics of Nonexistent Things ― An Odd Interpretation of the Shinkokinshū), 1961
- Recommending Mr. Yasunari Kawabata for the 1961 Nobel Prize for Literature, 1961
- Kawabata Yasunari shi to Bunkakunshō (川端康成氏と文化勲章 Yasunari Kawabata and the Order of Culture), 1961
- Shūmatsukan to Bungaku (終末観と文学 Eschatology and Literature), 1961
- 「Jun Bungaku to wa?」Sono Hoka (「純文学とは？」その他 What is Pure Literature? and Others), 1962
- Gendaishi to Shite no Shōsetsu (現代史としての小説 The Novel as Contemporary History), 1962
- Tanizaki Junichirō Ron (谷崎潤一郎論 A Theory of Junichirō Tanizaki), 1962
- Kawabata Yasunari Dokuhon Josetsu (川端康成読本序説 Introduction to the Yasunari Kawabata Reader), 1962
- Odori (踊り Dance), 1963
- Hayashi Fusao Ron (林房雄論 A Theory of Fusao Hayashi), 1963
- Hosoe Eikō Josetsu (細江英公序説 An Introduction to Eikō Hosoe), preface to Barakei, 1963
- Romanchikku Engeki no Fukkō (ロマンチック演劇の復興 Revival of the Romantic Theatre), 1963
- Henshishitta Yūga (変質した優雅 Perverted Elegance), 1963
- Geijutsu Dansō (芸術断想 Thoughts on Art), 1963
- Bungakuza no Shokun e no「Kōkaijō」―「Yorokobi no Koto」no Jōen Kyohi ni Tsuite (文学座の諸君への「公開状」――「喜びの琴」の上演拒否について An Open Letter to My Friends at the Bungakuza ― on the Rejection to Staging Yorokobi no Koto), 1963
- Raizō Take no Koto (雷蔵丈のこと On Take Raizō), 1964
- Kaisetsu『Nihon no Bungaku 38 Kawabata Yasunari』(解説『日本の文学38 川端康成』Commentary “Japanese Literature 38 Yasunari Kawabata"), 1964
- Kaisetsu『Gendai no Bungaku 38 Enchi Fumiko』(解説『現代の文学20 円地文子集』Commentary “Contemporary Literature 20 Fumiko Enchi Series”), 1964
- Bungaku ni Okeru Kōha ― Nihon Bungaku no Dansei teki Genri (文学における硬派――日本文学の男性的原理 The Tough Guy of Literature ― The Masculine Principle of Japanese Literature), 1964
- Gendai Bungaku no San Hōkō (現代文学の三方向 The Three Directions of Contemporary Literature), 1965
- Bungaku teki Yogen ― Shōwa Yonjū Nendai (文学的予言――昭和四十年代 A Literary Prophecy ― In the Time of 1965), 1965
- Tanizaki Chō Jidai no Shūen (谷崎朝時代の終焉 The End of the Tanizaki Era), 1965
- Kaisetsu『Nihon no Bungaku 2 Mori Ōgai (Ichi) 』(解説『日本の文学2 森鴎外（一）』Commentary “Japanese Literature 2 Ōgai Mori (1)”), 1966
- Kiken na Geijutsuka (危険な芸術家 The Dangerous Artist), 1966
- Eiga teki Nikutai Ron ― Sono Bubun Oyobi Zendai (映画的肉体論――その部分及び全体 A Cinematic Theory of the Body ― Its Parts and Its Whole), 1966
- Narushishizumu Ron (ナルシシズム論 A Theory of Narcissism), 1966
- Tanizaki Junichirō, Geijutsu to Seikatsu (谷崎潤一郎、芸術と生活 Junichirō Tanizaki, Art and Life), 1966
- Itō Shizuo no Uta ― Waga Shika (伊東静雄の詩――わが詩歌 The Poems of Shizuo Itō ― Our Poetry), 1966
- Tanizaki Junichirō Shō (谷崎潤一郎頌 In Praise of Junichirō Tanizaki), 1966
- Seinen Zō (青年像 Portrait of Youth), 1967
- Kokinshū to Shinkokinshū (古今集と新古今集 The Kokinshū and Shinkokinshū), 1967
- Poppukōn no Shinreijutsu ― Yoko’o Tadanori Ron (ポップコーンの心霊術―横尾忠則論 Popcorn Spiritualism ― A Theory of Yoko’o Tadanori), 1968
- 『Sentōgosho』Jobun (『仙洞御所』序文 Preface to Sentō Imperial Palace), 1968
- Shosetsu towa Nanika (小説とは何か What is the Novel?), 1968
- Noguchi Takehiko shi e no Kōkaijō (野口武彦氏への公開状 An Open Letter to Takehiko Noguchi), 1968
- Kaisetsu『Nihon no Bungaku 40 Hayashi Fusao・Takeda Rintarō・Shimaki Kensaku』(解説『日本の文学40 林房雄・武田麟太郎・島木健作』Commentary "Japanese Literature 40 Fusao Hayashi・Rintarō Takeda・Kensaku Shimaki"), 1968
- Hinuma shi to Shi (日沼氏と死 Hinuma and Death), 1968
- Shinoyama Kishin Ron (篠山紀信論 A Theory of Kishin Shinoyama), 1968
- All Japanese are perverse, 1968
- Kaisetsu『Nihon no Bungaku 4 Ozaki Kōyō・Izumi Kyōka』(解説『日本の文学4 尾崎紅葉・泉鏡花』 Commentary "Japanese Literature 4 Kōyō Ozaki・Kyōka Izumi"), 1969
- Jo (序 Preface to Tamotsu Yatō’s Photobook Hadakamatsuri), 1969
- Tsuruta Kōji Ron ―「Shōchō Tobaku」to「Hishakaku to Kiratsune」no Naka no (鶴田浩二論――「総長賭博」と「飛車角と吉良常」のなかの A Theory of Kōji Tsuruta ― In Shōchō Tobaku and Hishakaku to Kiratsune), 1969
- Nihon Bungaku Shoshi (日本文学小史 Some Histories of Japanese Literature), 1969 （Book Published in 1972）, an unfinished Literary criticism
- Kaisetsu『Nihon no Bungaku 52 Nozaki Kazuo・Tonomura Shigeru・Kanbayashi Akatsuki』(解説『日本の文学52 尾崎一雄・外村繁・上林暁』 Commentary "Japanese Literature 40 Kazuo Nozaki・Shigeru Tonomura・Akatsuki Kanbayashi"), 1969
- 『Nemureru Bijo』Ron (『眠れる美女』論 A Theory of The House of the Sleeping Beauties), 1970
- Matsugo no Me (末期の眼 Yasunari Kawabata's The Eye at the Deathbed), 1970
- Kaisetsu『Shinch ōNihon Bungaku 6 Tanizaki Junichirō Sho』(解説『新潮日本文学6 谷崎潤一郎集』 Commentary "Shinchō Japanese Literature 6 Junichirō Tanizaki Series"), 1970
- Sei teki Henshitsu kara Seiji teki Henshitsu e ― Bisukonti「Jigoku ni Ochita Yūja domo」o Megutte (性的変質から政治的変質へ――ヴィスコンティ「地獄に堕ちた勇者ども」をめぐって From Sexual Perversion to Political Perversion ― On Visconti's The Damned), 1970
- Kaisetsu『Nihon no Bungaku 34 Uchida Hyakken・Makino Shinichi・Inagaki Taruho』(解説『日本の文学34 内田百閒・牧野信一・稲垣足穂』 Commentary "Japanese Literature 34 Hyakken Uchida・Shinichi Makino・Taruho Inagaki"), 1970
- Yanagida Kunio『Tōno Monogatari』― Meicho Sai Hakken (柳田国男『遠野物語』――名著再発見 Kunio Yanagida’s Tale of Tōno ― Rediscovering a Literary Masterpiece), 1970
- Bōga (忘我 Ecstasy), 1970

== Public opinion and columns ==
- Shi no Bunryō (死の分量 The Weight of Death), 1953
- Dōtoku to Kodoku (道徳と孤独 Morality and Loneliness), 1953
- Moraru no Kangaku ― Geijutsuka ni Okeru Seijitsu no Mondai (モラルの感覚――芸術家における誠実の問題 Sense of Morality ― The Issue of Honesty in the Artist), 1953
- Shin Fasshizumu Ron (新ファッシズム論 A Theory of Neofascism), 1954
- Yokubō no Jūsoku ni Tsuite ― Kōfuku no Shinrigaku (欲望の充足について――幸福の心理学 On the Satisfaction of Desires ― The Psychology of Happiness), 1955
- Denki Sentakuki no Mondai (電気洗濯機の問題 The Problem with Laundary Machines), 1956
- Kame wa Usagi ni Oitsuku ka? ― Iwayuru Kōshikoku no Shomondai (亀は兎に追ひつくか？――いはゆる後進国の諸問題 Can the Tortoise Catch up with the Rabbit? ― The Many Problems of So-called “Third-World Countries”), 1956
- Kinofukefu (きのふけふ Recently), 1957, column
- Seishun no Annyui (青春の倦怠 The Ennui of Youth), 1957
- Yūrakuchō (憂楽帳 The Yūrakuchō Column of the Mainichishinbun), 1959, column
- Kantōgen (巻頭言 Foreword to the Fujinkōron), 1959
- Shakai Ryōri Mishima-tei (社会料理三島亭 Cooking of Societies―Kitchen Mishima), 1960
- Hitotsu no Seijiteki iken (一つの政治的意見 Party of One), 1960
- Hasshatō (発射塔 Launch Tower), 1960, column
- Amerikajin no Nihon Shinwa (アメリカ人の日本神話 Japan: The Cherished Myths), 1961
- Ma ― Gendai teki Jōkyō no Shōchō teki Kōzu (魔――現代的状況の象徴的構図 Demon ― A Symbolic Composition of the Contemporary State of Affairs), 1961
- Horie Seinen ni Tsuite (堀江青年について On Horie the Youth), 1962
- Tenkataihei no Shisō (天下泰平の思想 The Ideology of World Peace), 1963
- Seito o Shinpukusaseru dake no Wanryoku o ― Suparuta Kyōiku no Osusume (生徒を心服させるだけの腕力を――スパルタ教育のおすすめ Only as Much Force as to Gain the Devotion of Students ― Recommending the Agoge), 1964
- Kyokugen to Riariti (極限とリアリティー Extremity and Reality), 1964
- Kanojo mo Naita, Watashi mo Naita―Joshi Bare (彼女も泣いた、私も泣いた―女子バレー She Cried, and I Cried―Women Volleyball), 1964 Tokyo Olympic Reports
- Bunburyōdō (文武両道 Bunburyōdō), 1965
- Nihonjin no Hokori (日本人の誇り Pride of the Japanese), 1966
- Ochazuke Nashonarizum (お茶漬ナショナリズム Chazuke Nationalism), 1966
- Hōritsu to Mochiyaki (法律と餅焼き The Law and Roasting Mochi), 1966
- Danzō Geidō Saigunbi (団蔵・芸道・再軍備 Danzō, Performing Arts, and Rearmament), 1966
- Jo (序 舩坂弘著『英霊の絶叫』 Preface to Hiroshi Funasaka's Eirei no Zekkyō), 1966
- Nihon e no Shijō (日本への信条 Creed to Japan), 1967
- Bōkyaku to Bika (忘却と美化 Forgetting and Beautification), 1967
- 「Dōgi teki Kakumei」no Ronri ― Isobe Ittōshukei no Ikō ni Tsuite (「道義的革命」の論理――磯部一等主計の遺稿について The Logic of “Moral Revolution” ― On the Posthumous Manuscripts of Lieutenant Isobe), 1967
- Watashi no Naka no Hiroshima ― Genbaku no Hi ni Yosete (私の中のヒロシマ――原爆の日によせて The Hiroshima in Me ― On the Atomic Bomb Memorial Day), 1967
- Jinsei no Hon ― Suematsu Taihei Cho『Watashi no Shōwa Shi』(人生の本――末松太平著『私の昭和史』The Book of Life ― Taihei Suematsu's My Shōwa History), 1967
- Hagakure Nyūmon (葉隠入門 On Hagakure: The Samurai Ethic and Modern Japan), 1967
- Seinen Ron ― Kimi Jishin no Ikikata o Kangaeru Tame ni (青年論――キミ自身の生きかたを考へるために A Theory of Youth ― for Thinking about Your Own Way of Living), 1967
- JNG Karian (J・N・G仮案 An Informal Proposal of the Japan National Guard), 1968
- Sokoku Bōeitai wa Naze Hitsuyō ka? (祖国防衛隊はなぜ必要か？Why Is a National Defense Army Necessary?), 1968
- Aikokushin (愛国心 Patriotism), 1968
- Tsuburaya Ni’i no Jijin (円谷二尉の自刃The Suicide of First Lieutenant Tsuburaya), 1968
- Ni・Niroku Jiken ni Tsuite ― “Nihonshugi” Chimidoro no Saigo (二・二六事件について――“日本主義”血みどろの最期 On the February 26 Incident ― The Gory End of “Japanism”), 1968
- Wakaki Samurai no Tame no Seishin Kōwa (若きサムラヒのための精神講話 Spiritual Lectures for the Young Samurai), 1968
- Firutā no Susuhiroi ― Nihonbunkakaigi Hossoku ni Yosete (フィルターのすす払ひ――日本文化会議発足に寄せて Cleaning the Filter ― On the Founding of the Nihonbunkakaigi), 1968
- Bunka Bōei-ron (文化防衛論 On the Defense of Culture), 1968 （Book Published in 1969）
- Kinou to Bi (機能と美 Function and Beauty), 1968
- Eiyo no Kizuna de Tsunage Kiku to Katana (栄誉の絆でつなげ菊と刀 The Crysanthenum and the Sword Tied by a Bond of Honour), 1968
- Hashikawa Bunsō e no Kōkaijō (橋川文三への公開状 An Open Letter to Bunsō Hashikawa), 1968
- Jiyū to Kenryoku no Jyōkyō (自由と権力の状況 The Situation of Freedom and Power), 1968
- 「Senjiroku」ni Tsuite (「戦塵録」について On the Senjinroku), 1969
- Tōdai o Dōbutsuen ni Shiro (東大を動物園にしろ Let's Turn Tokyo University into a Zoo), 1969
- Gendai Seinen Ron (現代青年論 A Theory of the Contemporary Youth), 1969
- Ishi no Wakamono (維新の若者 Young People of the Restoration), 1969
- Han Kakumei Sengen (反革命宣言 A Counter-revolutionary Declaration), 1969
- Jieitai Nibun-ron (自衛隊二分論 Theory of Dividing Japan Self-Defense Forces into Two), 1969
- Ikkanfuwaku (一貫不惑 Ikkanfuwaku), 1969
- Sabaku no Jūnin e no Ronri teki Chōji ― Tōron o Owari e te (砂漠の住人への論理的弔辞――討論を終へて A Logical Condolence to the Inhabitants of the Desert ― Please End the Debates), 1969
- Kita Ikki Ron ―「Nihon Kaizō Hōan Taikō」o Chūshin to Shite (北一輝論――「日本改造法案大綱」を中心として A Theory of Ikki Kita ― Centering on the Outline for the Reorganization of Japan), 1969
- Nihon Bunka no Shinen ni Tsuite (日本文化の深淵について A Problem of Culture), 1969
- Kōdōgaku Nyūmon (行動学入門 Introductions to the Philosophy of Action), 1969 （Book Published in 1970）
- Mishima Yukio no Fakuto・Megaroporisu (三島由紀夫のファクト・メガロポリス Yukio Mishima's Megalopolis of Facts), 1969
- STAGE-LEFT IS RIGHT FROM AUDIENCE (abridged translation “Okinama and Madame Butterfly’s Offspring”), 1969
- Tatenokai no koto (「楯の会」のこと The Shield Society), 1969
- 「Kuni o Mamoru」to wa Nani ka (「国を守る」とは何か What Does It Mean to “Protect One’s Country”?), 1969 in literature
- 「Henkaku no Shisō」to wa ― Dōri no Jikken (「変革の思想」とは――道理の実現What an “Revolutionary Ideology” Means ― The Implementation of Reason), 1970
- Shin Chishikijin Ron (新知識人論 Neo-intellectualism), 1970
- 『Hasuda Zenmei to Sono Shi』Jobun (『蓮田善明とその死』序文 Preface to Zenmei Hasuda and His Death), 1970
- Mondaiteiki (問題提起 Raising a Question), 1970
- Shidō ni Tsuite ― Ishihara Shintarō e no Kōkaijō (士道について――石原慎太郎への公開状 On the Samurai Code ― An Open Letter to Shintarō Ishihara), 1970
- Hatashieteinai Yakusoku ― Watashi no Naka no Nijūgonen (果たし得てゐない約束――私の中の二十五年 A Promise Never Carried Out ― The Twenty-Five Years within Me), 1970
- Bushidō to Gunkokushugi (武士道と軍国主義 Samurai Code and Militarism), 1970
- Seikigun to Fuseikigun (正規軍と不正規軍 Regular and Irregular Armies), 1970
- Kakumei Tetsugaku to Shite no Yōmeigaku (革命哲学としての陽明学 Wang Yangming Thought as Revolutionary Philosophy), 1970
- Bushidō ni Kakeru Gendai no Bijinesu (武士道に欠ける現代のビジネスThe Absence of Samurai Code in Contemporary Business), 1970
- Waga Doushikan (わが同志観 My View on Comradeship), 1971

== Lectures and statements ==
- Nihon Bundan no Genjō to Seiyō Bungaku to no Kankei (日本文壇の現状と西洋文学との関係 The Status Quo of the Japanese Literary Circle and Its Relation to Western Literature), 1957.7.9 - University of Michigan
- INFLUENCES IN MODERN JAPANESE LITERATURE／YOMIURI JAPAN NEWS, 1958.2 - Tokyo Women's Club
- Bishoku to Bungaku (美食と文学 Gourmet and Literature), 1958.2.5 - commemorative event for the publication of Complete Works of Tanizaki Junichirō by the Chūōkōron magazine
- Nihon no Wakamono (日本の若者 Japanese Youth), 1961.9.18 - Holiday & University of California’s Symposium in Berkeley, California
- Watashi wa ikanishite Nihon no sakka ni nattaka (私はいかにして日本の作家となつたか How I have been grown up as the Japanese writer), 1966.4.18 - Speech at Foreign Correspondents' Club of Japan
- Bunkadaikakumei Ni Kansuru Seimei (文化大革命に関する声明 Statement on the Cultural Revolution), 1967.2.28 – joint statement with Yasunari Kawabata, Jun Ishikawa, Kōbō Abe in the Tokyo Shimbun and Sankei Shimbun
- Kotengeinō no Hōhō ni Yoru Seijijōkyō to Sei ― Sakka Mishima Yukio no Shōgen (古典芸能の方法による政治状況と性——作家・三島由紀夫の証言 Our Political Climate and Sex according to the Ways of Classical Theatre — A Testimony by Writer Yukio Mishima), 1967.2.23 – trial regarding the indecency in the film Kuroi Yuki at the Tokyo District Court
- Watashi no Jijubōei Ron (私の自主防衛論 My Theory of Autonomous National Defense), 1968.10.24 – extraordinary general meeting at the Japan Business Federation
- Shirōto Bōei Ron (素人防衛論 A Theory of National Defense for the Layman), 1968.11.20 – National Defense Academy of Japan at Yokosuka
- Nihon no Rekishi to Bunka to Dentō ni Tatte (日本の歴史と文化と伝統に立つて Situated in the History, Culture, and Traditions of Japan), 1968.12.1 – collaborative conference by the Tokyo Students’ Union and Kantō Students’ Union
- Nihon to wa Nani ka (日本とは何か What Is “Japan”?), 1969.10.15 – centennial of the Ministry of Finance
- Gendai Nihon no Shisō to Kōdō (現代日本の思想と行動 The Thoughts and Actions of Contemporary Japan), 1970.4.27 – regular meeting of the Sannō Research Society of Economics
- Watashi no Kiite Hoshii Koto (私の聞いて欲しいこと What I Want You to Know), 1970.5.28 – 84th anniversary of the founding of the Imperial Guards
- Aku no Hana ― Kabuki (悪の華――歌舞伎 Flowers of Evil ― Kabuki), 1970.7.3 – training school for Kabuki actors at the National Theatre
- 「Koritsu」no Susume (「孤立」のススメ Recommending “Isolation”), 1970.6.11, at the Shōshikai
- Waga Kuni no Jijubōei ni Tsuite (我が国の自主防衛について On the Autonomous National Defense of Our Country), 1970.9.3 – 3rd political workshop for the youth at the Shinseidōshikai (Association of the New Government)
- Geki (檄 An appeal), 1970.11.25 – JSDF Ichigaya Military Base

== Poems, haiku, and lyrics ==
- Akinoyoni… (アキノヨニ... Like Autumn…), 1931, haiku *
- Hinomaruno… (日ノマルノ... Of the Hinomaru…), 1932, haiku *
- Otōtōga… (おとうとが... My Brother…), 1932, haiku *
- Aki (秋 Autumn), 1932 *
- Imōto wa… (妹は... My Sister…), 1932, tanka *
- Mikan (蜜柑 Mandarin), 1937 *
- Kodama (こだま Tree Spirit), 1937 *
- Shayō (斜陽 Setting Sun), 1937 *
- Aki Nidai (秋二題 Two Titles for Autumn), 1937 *
- Shihen「Kinrei」(詩篇「金鈴」Poetry Collection Golden Bell), 1938 *
- Shinkirō no Kuni / Tsukiyosōren / Insei (蜃気楼の国／月夜操練／隕星 Country of Mirage / Drill on a Moonlit Night / Meteor), 1938, three poems in「鈴鹿鈔」*
- Shihen「Kyūkanchō」(詩篇「九官鳥」Poetry Collection Hill Myna), 1939 *
- Tanjōbi no Asa (誕生日の朝 Birthday Morning), 1939 *
- Mishiranu Heya de no Jisatsuja (見知らぬ部屋での自殺者 Person Who Committed Suicide in an Unknown Room), 1939 *
- Magagoto (凶ごと Ominous Word), 1940 *
- Shihen「Shōkyokushū」(詩篇「小曲集」Poetry Collection Short Pieces), 1940 *
- Shihen「Seijōshisō」(詩篇「青城詩抄」Poetry Collection Seijō Anthology), 1940 *
- Shihen「Jojōshishō」(詩篇「抒情詩抄」Poetry Collection Lyric Poetry Anthology), 1941 *
- Watakushi no Nozoi wa Okoru (わたくしの希ひは熾る My Hope Is Catching Fire), 1941 *
- Taishō (大詔 Imperial Rescript), 1942 *
- Ka no Hanano no Tsuyukesa (かの花野の露けさ Dews of Those Flower Fields), 1942 *
- Kiku (菊 Chrysanthemum), 1942 *
- Koi Kuyō (恋供養 Memorial Service for Romance), 1943 *
- Yoru no Semi (夜の蝉 Night Cicada), 1943 *
- Shijin no Tabi (詩人の旅 Journey of the Poet), 1944
- Mohaya Ironii wa Yameyo (もはやイロニイはやめよ Let’s Give Up on Irony Already), 1945
- Genka ― Natsu no Koibito (絃歌――夏の恋人 Genka ― Summer Lovers), 1945
- Kyōenma (饗宴魔 The Banquet Fanatic), 1945
- Ochiba no Uta (落葉の歌 Song of Fallen Leaves), 1946
- Kanpai (乾盃 Cheers), 1946
- Iddai Shihen (逸題詩篇 Nameless Poetry Collection), 1946
- Fushōsha (負傷者 The Injured), 1946
- Ko・Hasuda Zenmei e no Kenshi (故・蓮田善明への献詩 Poem for the Late Zenmei Hasuda), 1946
- Karunomiko Joshi (軽王子序詩 Introductory Poem for Prince Karu), 1946
- Atarashiki Koronbusu (新しきコロンブス The New Columbus), 1955, translation of Nietzsche's poem Der neue Columbus included in「小説家の休暇」
- Rihatsushi no Gengaku teki Yokubō to Futtobōru no Shokuyoku to no Sōkankankei (理髪師の衒学的欲望とフットボールの食慾との相関関係 The Correlation between a Barber’s Pedantic Wishes and Appetite for Football), 1957
- Shihen「Jūgosai Shishū」(詩篇「十五歳詩集」Poetry Collection Anthology of a Fifteen-years-old), 1957
- Kyōjo no Koiuta (狂女の恋唄 Lovesong of a Madwoman), 1958
- Mukashi to Ima, (むかしと今 Past and Present), 1958, translation of Hölderlin's poems Ehmals und Jetzt, Abendphantasie, Sokrates und Alcibiades
- Shukukonka Kantāta (祝婚歌 カンタータ Cantata for Wedding), 1959, for the Crown Prince
- Karakkazeyarō (からつ風野郎 Afraid to Die), 1960, for a film of the same name
- Ojōsan (お嬢さん The Mademoiselle), 1961, for a film (adaptation of Mishima's novel) of the same name
- Kurotokage no Uta (黒蜥蜴の歌 Song of the Black Lizard), 1962, for the musical Black Lizard
- Hohoemi (微笑 The Smile), translation of James Merrill's poems The Smile, Children of the World, 1964 (titles of originals unclear)
- Zōka ni Korosareta Funanori no Uta (造花に殺された舟乗りの歌 Song of a Boat Rider Killed by Artificial Flowers), 1966, for Akihiro Miwa’s charity recital
- Icarus (イカロス Icarus), 1967 - Epilogue of "Sun and Steel"
- Taika (隊歌 Song of the National Defense Army), 1968
- Okite! Aka no Wakaki Shishi-tachi (起て! 紅の若き獅子たち Awake! Young Red Lions), 1970, song of the Tatenokai
- Jisei no ku (辞世の句 Farewell Poems), 1970.11.25
  - 「益荒男が たばさむ太刀の 鞘鳴りに 幾とせ耐へて 今日の初霜」
  - 「散るをいとふ 世にも人にも 先駆けて 散るこそ花と 吹く小夜嵐」

== Photo subjects ==
- Barakei (薔薇刑 Ba Ra Kei: Ordeal by Rose), 1963 - photographer: Eikoh Hosoe
- Otoko no shi (男の死 The Death of a Man), 1970 - photographer: Kishin Shinoyama (Unpublished)

== Film ==
- Yūkoku (憂國 Patriotism), 1966

== Film adaptations ==
- 1951, August 31, Junpaku no Yoru (純白の夜 Pure White Nights), Directed by Hideo Ōba. Starring Michiyo Kogure, Masayuki Mori, and Yukio Mishima (as an Extra).
- 1953, January 14, Natsuko no Boken (夏子の冒険 Natsuko's Adventure), Directed by Noboru Nakamura. Starring Rieko Sumi, Masao Wakahara, Keiko Awaji.
- 1953, December 8, Nipponsei (にっぽん製 Made in Japan), Directed by Kōji Shima. Starring Fujiko Yamamoto, Ken Uehara.
- 1954, October 20, Shiosai (潮騒 The Sound of Waves). Directed by Senkichi Taniguchi. Starring Akira Kubo, Kyōko Aoyama, Toshiro Mifune.
- 1957, May 28, Nagasugita Haru (永すぎた春 Too Much of Spring). Directed by Shigeo Tanaka. Starring Ayako Wakao, Hiroshi Kawaguchi, Eiji Funakoshi.
- 1957, October 29, Bitoku no Yoromeki (美徳のよろめき The Misstepping of Virtue). Directed by Kō Nakahira. Starring Yumeji Tukioka, Rentarō Mikuni.
- 1958, August 19, Enjō (炎上 Conflagration) (金閣寺 The Temple of the Golden Pavilion). Directed by Kon Ichikawa. Starring Ichikawa Raizō, Tatsuya Nakadai, Ganjirō Nakamura.
- 1959, January 9, Fudōtoku Kyōiku Kōza (不道徳教育講座 Lectures on Immoral Education), Directed by Katsumi Nishikawa. Starring Shirō Ōsaka, Yumeji Tukioka, Hiroyuki Nagato, Masumi Okada, and Yukio Mishima (as the Navigator).
- 1959, February 24, Tōdai (灯台 The Lighthouse), Directed by Hedeo Suzuki. Starring Akira Kubo, Keiko Tsushima.
- 1961, February 15, Ojōsan (お嬢さん Mademoiselle), Directed by Tarō Yuge. Starring Ayako Wakao, Hiroshi Kawaguchi.
- 1962, March 14, Kurotokage (黒蜥蜴 The Black Lizard), Directed by Umeji Inoue. - Musical Film. Starring Machiko Kyō, Minoru Ōki.
- 1964, March 14, Ken (剣 Sword). Directed by Kenji Misumi. Starring Ichikawa Raizō.
- 1964, April 29, Shiosai (潮騒 The Sound of Waves), Directed by Kentarō Morinaga. Starring Sayuri Yoshinaga, Mitsuo Hamada.
- 1964, May 23, Kemono no Tawamure (獣の戯れ The Flirtation of Beasts), Directed by Sōkichi Tomimoto. Starring Ayako Wakao.
- 1965, February 14, Nikutai no Gakkō (肉体の学校 The School of Flesh), Directed by Ryō Kinoshita. Starring Kyōko Kishida, Tsutomu Yamazaki.
- 1966, April 12, Yūkoku (憂國 Patriotism). Directed by Yukio Mishima and Domoto Masaki. Starring Yukio Mishima.
- 1966, June 22, Fukuzatsuna Kare (複雑な彼 That Complicated Guy), Directed by Kōji Shima. Starring Jiro Tamiya, Mariko Taka, Nobuo Nakamura, Edith Hanson.
- 1967, February 18, Ai no Kawaki (愛の渇き Thirst for Love). Directed by Koreyoshi Kurahara. Starring Ruriko Asaoka, Nobuo Nakamura.
- 1968, August 14, Kurotokage (黒蜥蜴 The Black Lizard). Directed by Kinji Fukasaku. Starring Akihiro Miwa, Isao Kimura, and Yukio Mishima (as a Human Statue). Based on a novel by Edogawa Rampo and an adaptation by Yukio Mishima.
- 1971, September 24, Shiosai (潮騒 The Sound of Waves), Directed by Shirō Moritani. Starring Itsuto Asahina, Midori Onozato.
- 1972, November 11, Ongaku (音楽 The Music). Directed by Yasuzo Masumura. Starring Noriko Kurosawa, Toshiyuki Hosokawa.
- 1975, April 26, Shiosai (潮騒 The Sound of Waves), Directed by Katsumi Nishikawa. Starring Momoe Yamaguchi, Tomokazu Miura.
- 1976, July 17, Kinkaku-ji (金閣寺 The Temple of the Golden Pavilion). Directed by Yoichi Takabayashi. Starring Saburo Shinoda, Toshio Shiba.
- 1976, August 28, Gogo no Eikō (午後の曳航 The Sailor Who Fell from Grace with the Sea). Directed by Lewis John Carlino. Starring Sarah Miles, Kris Kristofferson.
- 1980, November 15, Kōfukugō Shuppan (幸福号出帆 The S.S. Happiness Sets Sail), Directed by Kōichi Saitō. Starring Mariko Fuji.
- 1983, November 2, Ai no Shokei (愛の処刑 The Execution of Love), Directed by Masayoshi Nogami. Starring Hesuke Miki, Hajime Ishigami.
- 1985, October 10, Shiosai (潮騒 The Sound of Waves), Directed by Tugunobu Kotani. Starring Chiemi Hori, Shingo Tsurumi, Tetsurō Tanba.
- 1986, September 20, Rokumeikan (鹿鳴館 The Rokumeikan), Directed by Kon Ichikawa. Starring Ruriko Asaoka, Bunta Sugawara, Kōji Ishizaka, Kiichi Nakai, Kyōko Kishida, Yasuko Sawaguchi.
- 1998, November 18, L'École de la chair (肉体の学校 The School of Flesh). Directed by Benoît Jacquot. Starring Isabelle Huppert, Vincent Martinez, Vincent Lindon, Jean-Louis Richard, Marthe Keller.
- 2005, October 29, Haru no Yuki (春の雪 Spring Snow). Directed by Isao Yukisada. Starring Satoshi Tumabuki, Yūko Takeuchi, Sousuke Takaoka, Ayako Wakao.
- 2017, May 26, Utsukusi Hoshi (美しい星 Beautiful Star). Directed by Daihachi Yoshida. Starring Lily Franky, Kazuya Kamenashi, Ai Hashimoto, Tomoko Nakajima, Kuranosuke Sasaki.

== Starring ==
- 1960, May 23, Karakkaze Yarō (からっ風野郎 Afraid to Die). Directed by Yasuzo Masumura. Starring Yukio Mishima and Ayako Wakao.
- 1969, August 9, Hitokiri (人斬り Hitokiri). Directed by Hideo Gosha. Starring Shintaro Katsu, Tatsuya Nakadai, Yujiro Ishihara and Yukio Mishima.

== Sources ==
- Satō, Hideaki; Inoue, Takashi; Yamanaka, Takeshi, eds. (2005). 決定版 三島由紀夫全集 第42巻 年譜・書誌 [Definitive Edition Yukio Mishima Complete Works No.42 – Biographical Sketch and Bibliography] (in Japanese). Shinchosha. ISBN 978-4-10-642582-0.
- Matsumoto, Tōru; Satō, Hideaki; Inoue, Takashi, eds. (2000). 三島由紀夫事典 [Encyclopedia of Yukio Mishima] (in Japanese). Bensei Shuppan. ISBN 978-4-585-06018-5.
- Isoda, Kōichi, ed. (1983). 新潮日本文学アルバム20 三島由紀夫 [Yukio Mishima]. Shincho Japanese literature Album No.20 (in Japanese). Shinchosha. ISBN 978-4-10-620620-7.
