= Densetsu =

Densetsu may refer to:

== Literature ==
- "Densetsu", a 1948 short story by Yukio Mishima
- Densetsu series, a 2012–2018 novel series by Nisio Isin

== Songs ==
- "Densetsu", from the 1998 Pocket Monsters Sound Anime Collection
- "Densetsu", the ending theme of the 2007 film GoGo Sentai Boukenger vs. Super Sentai

== Television ==
- "Densetsu", a 2002 episode of X
- "Densetsu", a 2017 episode of Zero: Dragon Blood
- "Densetsu", a 2023 episode of Bastard!!
- "Densetsu", a 2024 episode of Dragon Ball Daima
