= Death in Midsummer =

Death in Midsummer may refer to:

- Death in Midsummer (short story), a 1952 short story by Yukio Mishima
- Death in Midsummer and Other Stories, a 1966 anthology of Yukio Mishima short stories
- Death in Midsummer, a single from the Deerhunter album Why Hasn't Everything Already Disappeared?
