= Star (short story) =

Short story by Yukio Mishima

- Short story by Yukio Mishima
- Original title: スタア (Sutā)
- Translator: Sam Bett
- Country: Japan
- Language: Japanese

Publication
- Published in: Gunzo
- Publication type: Periodical
- Publisher: Kodansha
- Media type: Print (Magazine)
- Publication date: November 1960
- Published in English: 4 April 2019

"Star" (Japanese: スタア, Hepburn: "Sutā") is a short story by Yukio Mishima. It was originally published in the November 1960 issue of Gunzo, a literary magazine published by Kodansha. It was later included alongside "Patriotism" and "Hyakuman'en senbei" (百万円煎餅) in the short story collection of the same name, Sutā (スタア), which was published on 30 January 1961 by Shinchosha.

Published shortly after Mishima had his first starring role in a film, "Star" tells the story of a popular young actor disillusioned with fame and the anxieties he has about his career and public image. Relatively forgotten in Japan and overshadowed by Mishima's other works, "Star" was later translated into English by Sam Bett. Bett's translation was published as a standalone novella in paperback format by New Directions Publishing on 30 April 2019 (ISBN 978-0-8112-2842-8) and through the Penguin Modern Classics series of Penguin Books on 4 April 2019 (ISBN 978-0-241-38347-6). Bett was awarded the 2019–2020 Japan-U.S. Friendship Commission Prize for the Translation of Japanese Literature for his translation of Mishima's short story.

== Plot ==
The story centers on Rikio "Richie" Mizuno, a twenty-three-year-old actor disillusioned with fame and the film industry. He acts in a series of films where he plays a tough and hardened Yakuza gangster. Rikio prides himself for his appearance and physical build, and is adored by crowds of obsessive fans. However, he is dominated by an anxiety about himself and repeatedly expresses both fear and excitation over the inevitability of his aging. He finds release through his relationship with Kayo, his personal assistant and lover. She is an unattractive woman, but Rikio is drawn to her authenticity. She is honest in her characterizations of herself, including her physical appearance and her age, especially when compared to the youthful Rikio. She often mocks Rikio about his body, his flamboyant and flirtatious lifestyle, his stardom, the countless letters of fan mail he receives, and the starlets he acts alongside in films. Her authenticity contrasts with the inauthenticity of Rikio, who wears a "mask" every day as an actor and has a carefully cultivated public persona for his fans and the media.

In one scene, an aspiring actress named Yuri Asano ambushes Rikio while he is filming on set. She succeeds in persuading the director of the film to write a role for her into the script. However, her charm wears off on the director when she messes up the part and reveals herself rather unskilled in acting. After being cut from the script, she escapes to the dressing room and attempts suicide by overdosing on Valamin. Everyone on the set witnesses the scene as a doctor tries to inject saline into her arm but is disrupted when she repeatedly slaps the syringe out of his hand. Kayo and Rikio joke about the incident later that night, with Kayo mocking the Yuri's twitching and protesting. The film studio's public relations team spin the story to say that Rikio intervened and saved the woman's life.

The story ends with Rikio and Kayo pondering Rikio's suicide, or if old age will one day take him.

== Background ==
"Star" was written either during or shortly after Mishima acted in Afraid to Die (1960), a Yakuza film directed by Yasuzo Masumura. In the film, Mishima played a young gangster recently released from prison, where he served time for avenging the murder of his mobster boss father. It was his first starring role in a film. The process was physically and mentally draining for Mishima. Masumura was unsatisfied with Mishima's acting skills, and demanded many retakes as a result. Production of the film was further marred when, on 1 March 1960, Mishima fell down an escalator and injured his head. He was hospitalized for nine days. Filming concluded on 15 March 1960, and Mishima told reporters the next day he "had had his fill of appearing in films."

"Star" has been described as being "mostly forgotten" now in Japan and overshadowed by Mishima's other works.

In Bett's translation, he changed the protagonist's original name, Yutaka, to Rikio, in part to help English-language readers "access the symbolism" of the story but also due to the phonetic similarity between Rikio and the name Takeo, the name of Mishima's character in Afraid to Die.

== Reception ==
=== Translation ===
Bett's translation, published in 2019 as the novella Star, received mostly favourable reviews from critics.

Publishers Weekly wrote, "Mishima is a master of the psychological: he blurs distinctions between Rikio's identity and the characters he plays in disorienting but never jarring transitions between movie scenes and reality." Thomas Gebremedhin of The Wall Street Journal called it "pitch-perfect novella" and "a stunning addition to the oeuvre of one of postwar Japans greatest storytellers." In The New York Times Book Review, musician and writer Patti Smith called the novella "a startlingly modern, hypervisual jewel." In the Los Angeles Review of Books, Jan Wilm wrote, "Even if Star is a relatively minor work in the pantheon of Mishimas greatness, it is an exquisite contemplation of existence and death, and Mishima's prose is extremely powerful and the translation finely executed." In his review in The Kenyon Review, Daniel Felsenthal wrote that Bett "manages to preserve a difficult balance of precision and lyricism that captures Mishima's coldly ecstatic voice".

In a less favourable review, Kirkus Reviews wrote that "the weightless story is mercifully brief."

Bett's translation was also reviewed in The Times Literary Supplement, The Japan Times, The Japan News, Booklist, Complete Review, PopMatters, Columbia Journal, and Spectrum Culture.
