= Takeo (given name) =

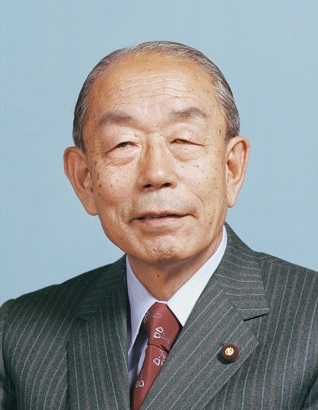
- Takeo Fukuda, the 67th Prime Minister of Japan
- Pronunciation: Tá-ké-ó
- Gender: Male

Origin
- Origin: Japanese
- Meaning: It can have many different meanings depending on the kanji used.

Takeo (たけお, タケオ) is a common masculine Japanese given name.

== Kanji ==
Takeo can be written using different kanji and can mean:

- 武夫, "military husband"
- 武雄, "military masculinity"
- 猛雄, "fierce masculinity"
- 健男, "healthy man"
- 健雄, "healthy masculinity"

The name can also be written in hiragana or katakana, especially by young boys who haven't learned kanji yet.

== People with the given name Takeo ==
- Takeo Ando (武夫, born 1938), professional Go player
- Takeo Arishima (武郎, 1878–1923), Japanese novelist
- Takeo Daigo (醍醐 猛夫; 1938–2019), Japanese baseball player
- Takeo Doi (健郎, 1920–2009), Japanese psychoanalyst
- Takeo Fukuda (赳夫, 1905–1995), 67th Prime Minister of Japan
- Takeo Fukui (威夫, born 1944), president and CEO of Honda Motor Co., Ltd.
- Takeo Hatanaka (武夫, 1914–1963), Japanese astronomer
- Takeo Hirose (武夫, 1868–1904), officer in the Imperial Japanese Navy
- Takeo Itō (武夫, 1889–1965), general in the Imperial Japanese Army
- Takeo Kajiwara (武雄, 1923–2009), Japanese professional Go player
- Takeo Kanade (武雄, born 1945), Japanese researcher in Computer Vision
- Takeo Kawamura (丈夫, born 1972), Japanese professional baseball player
- Takeo Kawamura (建夫, born 1942), Japanese politician
- Takeo Kikuchi (武夫, born 1939), Japanese industrial and fashion designer
- Takeo Kimura (木村 威夫, 1918–2010), Japanese filmmaker
- Takeo Kurita (健男, 1889–1977), vice-admiral in the Imperial Japanese Navy
- Takeo Miki (武夫, 1907–1988), 66th Prime Minister of Japan
- Takeo Miratsu (健雄, 1960–2006), Japanese video game and Anime composer
- Takeo Nishioka (武夫, 1936–2011), Japanese politician
- Takeo Otsuka (武生, born 1966), Japanese professional wrestler
- Takeo Shimotori (霜鳥 武雄; born 1928), Japanese sport wrestler
- Takeo Shiota (1881–1943), Japanese-American landscape architect
- Takeo Spikes (born 1976), American football linebacker
- Takeo Sugawara (菅原 武男; born 1938), Japanese hammer thrower
- Takeo Sugiyama (杉山 武雄; born 1933), Japanese basketball player
- Takeo Takagi (武雄, 1892–1944), admiral in the Imperial Japanese Navy
- Takeo Takahashi (丈夫), Japanese animation director
- Takeo Uesugi (上杉武夫, 1940–2016), Japanese-American landscape architect
- Takeo Yamaguchi (山口 長男; 1902–1983), Japanese painter
- Takeo Yano, Japanese judoka
- Takeo Yasuda (武雄, 1889–1964), general in the Imperial Japanese Army
- Takeo Yoshikawa (猛夫, 1914–1993), Japanese spy

== Fictional characters with the given name Takeo ==
- Takeo Saeki (剛雄), software developer
- Takeo Masaki, character in Call of Duty zombies series
- Otori Takeo, main character in the Tales of the Otori series by Lian Hearn
- Takeo Gōda (剛田 猛男), main character from the manga series, My Love Story!! by Kazune Kawahara.
- Takeo, mascot for the Nekocon anime convention
- Takeo Ishiyama, supporting character of Code Lyoko in which he is father of dutiful Lyoko warrior Yumi Ishiyama
- Takeo Sasaki, in the Marvel anime miniseries of X-Men the only child of Dr. Yui Sasaki and the immensely powerful telepath Charles Xavier
- Takeo Kumagami (熊耳武緒), character in Patlabor. A member of Section 2, Division 2, Team 2. Voiced by: Keiko Yokozawa
