= Thirst for Love (film) =

- Theatrical release poster
- Directed by: Koreyoshi Kurahara
- Screenplay by: Toshiya Fujita; Koreyoshi Kurahara
- Based on: 愛の渇き (Thirst for Love) by Yukio Mishima
- Produced by: Kazuo Otsuka
- Starring: Nobuo Nakamura; Ruriko Asaoka; Akira Yamanouchi
- Cinematography: Yoshio Mamiya
- Edited by: Akira Suzuki
- Music by: Toshiro Mayuzumi
- Production company: Nikkatsu
- Release date: 18 February 1967 (Japan)
- Running time: 99 minutes
- Country: Japan
- Language: Japanese

Thirst for Love (Japanese: 愛の渇き, Hepburn: Ai no kawaki) is a 1967 Japanese drama film directed by Koreyoshi Kurahara, starring Nobuo Nakamura and Ruriko Asaoka. It is also known as Longing for Love and The Thirst for Love. It tells the story of a young widow who becomes the mistress of her wealthy father-in-law. The film is based on the novel Thirst for Love by Yukio Mishima.

== Cast ==
- Nobuo Nakamura as Yakichi Sugimoto
- Ruriko Asaoka as Etsuko
- Akira Yamanouchi as Kensuke
- Yuko Kusunoki as Chieko
- Yoko Ozono as Asako
- Junko Shinami as Nobuko
- Takayuki Iwama as Natsuo
- Tetsuo Ishidate as Saburô
- Chitose Kurenai as Miyo

== Reception ==
Fernando F. Croce wrote for Slant Magazine in 2011, when the film was released on DVD by The Criterion Collection: "Kurahara makes use of an ample arsenal of cinematic effects—abrupt disjunctions of sound and image, intertitles alternating with inner monologues, strategic flashes of lurid color following sudden bloodbaths—to visualize the voluptuous turmoil of Mishima’s avant-garde writing, all while exploring his own motifs of fears and desires churning under tidy surfaces."
