= Thirst for Love =

Novel by Yukio Mishima

First edition (Japanese)

Thirst for Love (or 愛の渇き, Ai no Kawaki) is a 1950 novel by the Japanese writer Yukio Mishima. The word "kawaki" literally means thirst, but has a sense of parched dryness associated with it.

Thirst for Love is Mishima's third novel, following the immensely successful Confessions of a Mask (1949). Unlike the coming of age of a male narrator in Confessions, Mishima may have deliberately moved to a woman protagonist and a third person narrative. Donald Keene says of Thirst for Love that it is "a youthful work, but one of Mishima's best".

The book was adapted into the 1967 film Thirst for Love.

== Plot ==
The novel centers on the experience of Etsuko, a woman who has moved into the house of her in-laws following the death of her husband Ryosuke from typhoid. There she falls into a physical relationship with her father-in-law (Yakichi) which both repulses and numbs her. She comes to develop romantic feelings for the young gardener Saburo, who is oblivious of her interest, and turns out to be having an affair with the maid Miyo.

The story develops over a period of just over a month, from September 22, when the book opens with her buying two pairs of socks as a gift for Saburo, to October 28, 1949, when the story reaches its violent climax. The narrative progresses through a series of flashbacks, and intense, stream of consciousness reflections, focusing on Etsuko's obsession, which she attempts to hide in the beginning, but which reveals itself as it gradually spins out of control.

At times lyrical, the novel is starkly drawn, with dark brooding scenes interspersed with bright sunbursts. The text is particularly notable for its sharp and radical observations, as in: "Etsuko was a beautiful eczema. At Yakichi's age, he couldn't itch without eczema." (p. 134). The writing is interlaced with asides reflecting a dark brooding focus, as in the child taking pleasure after drowning a colony of ants in boiling water, or in mutilated rose petals lying face down in rainwater. These dark moments, as in much of Mishima's writings, tend to bring the reader to a foreboding of impending tragedy.

== Themes ==
The novel deals with themes which are prevalent throughout many of Mishima's other works, including unrequited sexual longing and the desire to inflict pain upon the object of one's love. Some have suggested a streak of narcissistic revenge arising from a pre-Oedipal complex running through this and several other Mishima texts.

== Translations and film ==
Thirst for Love was translated into English by Alfred H. Marks (Alfred A. Knopf, 1969). A paperback edition was released July 1971 from Berkley Books.

Ai no Kawaki was made into a 1967 film with the same title, directed by Koreyoshi Kurahara, with Ruriko Asaoka playing Etsuko.
