= List of Bastard!! episodes =

Bastard!! Heavy Metal, Dark Fantasy is a Japanese original net animation (ONA) series based on Kazushi Hagiwara's manga series of the same name. The series, produced by Liden Films, was announced in February 2022. The 24-episode ONA is directed by Takaharu Ozaki, with scripts written by Yōsuke Kuroda, character designs by Sayaka Ono, and music composed by Yasuharu Takanashi. The first 13 episodes were released worldwide on Netflix on June 30, 2022, while the remaining 11 episodes were released on September 15 of the same year. The opening theme is "Bloody Power Fame" by Coldrain, while the ending theme is "Blessless" by Tielle. In Japan, the ONA series began a televised broadcast on BS11 on January 11, 2023. (Note: BS11 lists the premiere for the series on Tuesday at 25:00, which is effectively Wednesday at midnight JST.)

A second season was announced in January 2023. It premiered on Netflix on July 31, 2023, and consists of 15 episodes. The opening theme is "New Dawn" by Coldrain, while the ending theme is "La Muse Perdue" by Tielle. The second season start broadcast on BS11 and other networks on January 3, 2024; (Note: BS11 lists the premiere for the series on Tuesday at 24:00, which is effectively Wednesday at midnight JST.) the first three episodes aired as a 90-minute special.

== Series overview ==
Season	Episodes		Originally released
1	24	13	June 30, 2022
1	24	11	September 15, 2022
2	15		July 31, 2023

== Episode list ==
=== Season 1 (2022) ===
No. overall	No. in season	Title	Directed by	Written by	Storyboarded by	Original release date
Part 1
1	1	"The Arrival"; Transliteration: "Tōjō" (Japanese: 登場)	Takaharu Ozaki	Yōsuke Kuroda	Takaharu Ozaki	June 30, 2022
2	2	"Rampage"; Transliteration: "Bōsō" (Japanese: 暴走)	Tomohiro Matsukawa	Yōsuke Kuroda	Taizō Yoshida	June 30, 2022
3	3	"Abduction"; Transliteration: "Yūkai" (Japanese: 誘拐)	Hye-jin Seo	Hideyuki Kurata	Takaharu Ozaki	June 30, 2022
4	4	"Invasion"; Transliteration: "Totsunyū" (Japanese: 突入)	Tatsuya Shiraishi	Hideyuki Kurata	Takaharu Ozaki	June 30, 2022
5	5	"Showdown"; Transliteration: "Ketchaku" (Japanese: 決着)	Junichi Kitamura	Hideyuki Kurata	Junichi Kitamura	June 30, 2022
6	6	"Destiny"; Transliteration: "In'nen" (Japanese: 因縁)	Daishi Katō	Yōsuke Kuroda	Satoshi Shimizu	June 30, 2022
7	7	"The Demon Beast"; Transliteration: "Majū" (Japanese: 魔獣)	Tomohiro Matsukawa	Yōsuke Kuroda	Shinji Itadaki	June 30, 2022
8	8	"The Progenitor"; Transliteration: "Shinsō" (Japanese: 真祖)	Yasuhiro Minami	Hideyuki Kurata	Shinji Itadaki	June 30, 2022
9	9	"Blue Nail"; Transliteration: "Ao Tsume" (Japanese: 青爪)	Kiyoshi Murayama	Hideyuki Kurata	Hisayasu Shiba	June 30, 2022
10	10	"The Goddess of Thunder"; Transliteration: "Raijin" (Japanese: 雷神)	Tatsuya Shiraishi	Yōsuke Kuroda	Hisayasu Shiba	June 30, 2022
11	11	"Prophecy"; Transliteration: "Yogen" (Japanese: 予言)	Akira Mano	Yōsuke Kuroda	Takashi Nagayoshi	June 30, 2022
12	12	"Life or Death"; Transliteration: "Shisei" (Japanese: 死生)	Keishi Kawakubo	Yōsuke Kuroda	Kazuhiro Ozawa	June 30, 2022
13	13	"Wavering"; Transliteration: "Dōyō" (Japanese: 同様)	Tomohiro Matsukawa	Yōsuke Kuroda	Takaharu Ozaki	June 30, 2022
Part 2
14	14	"Moved to Tears"; Transliteration: "Kankyū" (Japanese: 感泣)	Yasuhiro Minami	Hideyuki Kurata	Taizō Yoshida	September 15, 2022
15	15	"Triumphant Returns"; Transliteration: "Gaisen" (Japanese: 凱旋)	Kiyoshi Murayama (Note: Assisted by Tetsuaki Matsuda.)	Hideyuki Kurata	Satoshi Shimizu	September 15, 2022
16	16	"Incantation"; Transliteration: "Kinju" (Japanese: 禁呪)	Akira Mano	Yōsuke Kuroda	Kazuya Sakamoto	September 15, 2022
17	17	"Ring"; Transliteration: "Yubiwa" (Japanese: 指輪)	Susumu Yamamoto	Yōsuke Kuroda	Shinji Itadaki	September 15, 2022
18	18	"Secrets of the Sword"; Transliteration: "Hiken" (Japanese: 秘剣)	Keishi Kawakubo	Hideyuki Kurata	Shinji Itadaki	September 15, 2022
19	19	"Empress of Thunder"; Transliteration: "Rai Tei" (Japanese: 雷帝)	Tetsuaki Matsuda	Hideyuki Kurata	Shinji Itadaki	September 15, 2022
20	20	"Tyranny"; Transliteration: "Bōgyaku" (Japanese: 暴虐)	Kiyoshi Murayama	Hideyuki Kurata	Shinji Itadaki	September 15, 2022
21	21	"Fierce Battle"; Transliteration: "Gekitō" (Japanese: 激闘)	Akira Mano	Hideyuki Kurata	Yūsuke Kubo	September 15, 2022
22	22	"Conclusion"; Transliteration: "Yuishō" (Japanese: 結章)	Yasushi Muroya	Yōsuke Kuroda	Jirō Kanai	September 15, 2022
23	23	"Annihilation"; Transliteration: "Shōmetsu" (Japanese: 消滅)	Toshiyuki Sone	Yōsuke Kuroda	Shinji Itadaki	September 15, 2022
24	24	"End"; Transliteration: "Shūen" (Japanese: 終焉)	Kōji Aritomi	Yōsuke Kuroda	Takaharu Ozaki	September 15, 2022

=== Season 2 (2023) ===
No. overall	No. in season	Title	Directed by	Written by	Storyboarded by	Original release date
25	1	"Rebellion"; Transliteration: "Hanki" (Japanese: 叛旗)	Keishi Kawakubo	Yōsuke Kuroda	Takaharu Ozaki	July 31, 2023
26	2	"Fate"; Transliteration: "Unmei" (Japanese: 運命)	Tatsuya Shiraishi	Yōsuke Kuroda	Tatsuya Shiraishi	July 31, 2023
27	3	"Blue Storm"; Transliteration: "Seiran" (Japanese: 青嵐)	Kōji Aritomi	Yōsuke Kuroda	Shinji Itadaki	July 31, 2023
28	4	"Dawn"; Transliteration: "Reimei" (Japanese: 黎明)	Shunji Yoshida	Yōsuke Kuroda	Jirō Kanai	July 31, 2023
29	5	"Ice and Snow"; Transliteration: "Hyōsetsu" (Japanese: 氷雪)	Tetsuaki Matsuda	Yōsuke Kuroda	Yasushi Muroi	July 31, 2023
30	6	"Departure"; Transliteration: "Shukkō" (Japanese: 出航)	Tatsuya Shiraishi	Yōsuke Kuroda	Tatsuya Shiraishi	July 31, 2023
31	7	"Teleportation"; Transliteration: "Ten'i" (Japanese: 転移)	Minami Honma (Note: Assisted by Shougo Ono.); Takaharu Ozaki (Note: Butoh Scene Director (舞踏シーン演出))	Yōsuke Kuroda	Shinji Itadaki	July 31, 2023
32	8	"Magic Land"; Transliteration: "Makyō" (Japanese: 魔境)	Minami Honma (Note: Assisted by Yasuhito Kikuchi.)	Yōsuke Kuroda	Yoshiaki Okumura	July 31, 2023
33	9	"Legend"; Transliteration: "Densetsu" (Japanese: 伝説)	Keishi Kawakubo	Yōsuke Kuroda	Satoshi Shimizu	July 31, 2023
34	10	"Distant Thunder"; Transliteration: "Enrai" (Japanese: 遠雷)	Tomo Ookubo	Yōsuke Kuroda	Shinpei Nagai	July 31, 2023
35	11	"Holy War I"; Transliteration: "Seisen I" (Japanese: 聖戦I)	Toshiyuki Sone	Yōsuke Kuroda	Ryūhei Aoyagi	July 31, 2023
36	12	"Holy War II"; Transliteration: "Seisen II" (Japanese: 聖戦II)	Takashi Hashimoto (Note: Assisted by Tetsuaki Matsuda and Tarō Tanaka.)	Yōsuke Kuroda	Takashi Hashimoto	July 31, 2023
37	13	"Holy War III"; Transliteration: "Seisen III" (Japanese: 聖戦III)	Akira Toba	Yōsuke Kuroda	Takaharu Ozaki; Shinpei Nagai	July 31, 2023
38	14	"Holy War IV"; Transliteration: "Seisen IV" (Japanese: 聖戦IV)	Kouji Aritomi	Yōsuke Kuroda	Takaharu Ozaki; Shinpei Nagai	July 31, 2023
39	15	"Gathering"; Transliteration: "Shūketsu" (Japanese: 集結)	Keishi Kawakubo	Yōsuke Kuroda	Takaharu Ozaki	July 31, 2023
