= Death in Midsummer (short story) =

Short story by Yukio Mishima

- Short story by Yukio Mishima
- Original title: Manatsu no shi
- Translator: Edward G. Seidensticker
- Country: Japan
- Language: Japanese

Publication
- Published in: Shinchō
- Publication type: Magazine
- Media type: Print
- Publication date: 1952
- Published in English: 1956

Death in Midsummer (Japanese: 真夏の死, Hepburn: Manatsu no shi) is a short story by Japanese writer Yukio Mishima first published in October 1952.

== Plot ==
Young mother Tomoko spends a summer vacation at Izu Peninsula with her three children and her sister-in-law Yasue. While Tomoko takes a nap in the hotel room, Yasue and the children go down to the sea, with Yasue staying on the beach and the children playing near the water. When the two older children suddenly disappear, Yasue runs down into the sea in an attempt to find them, but suffers a heart attack from which she eventually dies. Despite a subsequent search, the two children remain missing. Tomoko's husband Masaru drives over from Tokyo and comforts Tomoko, who blames herself for the accident.

During the next months, Tomoko is torn between feelings of guilt, a longing for sympathy for her loss, and fear for her youngest son. When she gives birth to a daughter, she slowly regains her mental stability. Two years after the accident, Tomoko expresses her desire to go to Izu again; Masaru, who at first opposes her wish, finally gives in. While the couple stands on the beach with their children, Masaru notices that Tomoko stares out at the sea as if she were waiting for something.

== Publication history ==
Death in Midsummer, written after Mishima's first trip overseas from December 1951 to May 1952, was initially published in October 1952 in the magazine Shinchō. It was released in book form in a collection of Mishima short stories by Sōgensha the following year, lending its title to the collection. It has seen numerous reprints and inclusions in anthologies of Mishima's collected works.

== Translations ==
Death in Midsummer first appeared in English in a translation provided by Edward G. Seidensticker in 1956. Seidensticker's translation re-appeared in a 1966 collection of Mishima short stories in 1966, titled Death in Midsummer and Other Stories, which too has been reprinted numerous times. (Apart from the title story, the contents of the 1953 Japanese and the 1966 English anthology are not identical.) (Note: The 1953 Japanese edition contains the stories "Death in Midsummer" (眞夏の死), "Kurosuwādo pazuru" (クロスワード・パズル), "Bishin" (美神), "Tsubasa" (翼), "Tada hodo takai mono wa nai" (只ほど高いものはない), and "Sotoba Komachi". The 1966 English edition contains the stories "Death in Midsummer", "Three Million Yen", "Thermos Flasks", "The Priest of Shiga Temple and His Love", "The Seven Bridges", "Patriotism", "Dōjōji", "Onnagata", "The Pearl", and "Swaddling Clothes".)

The story has also been translated into French, German, Spanish, Italian, and Russian.

== Reception ==
In a 1966 review for The New York Times, critic Robert Trumbull saw Mishima's story in parts as "a sociological study" which "plunges into dark psychic depth".
