= Rikio =

- Gender: Male

Origin
- Origin: Japanese
- Meaning: Different meanings depending on the kanji used

Rikio (written: 力夫 or 力雄) is a masculine Japanese given name. Notable people with the name include:

- Rikio Sato (佐藤 力夫; born 1947), Japanese bobsledder
- Rikio Yoshida (吉田 力雄; born 1939), Japanese Nordic combined skier

== See also ==
- Takeshi Rikio (力皇 猛; born 1972), Japanese professional wrestler
