= Patriotism (1966 film) =

Patriotism or the Rite of Love and Death
- Cover of The Criterion Collection DVD
- Directed by: Yukio Mishima; Domoto Masaki
- Screenplay by: Yukio Mishima
- Based on: "Patriotism" by Yukio Mishima
- Produced by: Yukio Mishima
- Starring: Yukio Mishima; Yoshiko Tsuruoka
- Cinematography: Kimio Watanabe
- Music by: Richard Wagner
- Production company: Yukio Mishima Production
- Distributed by: Japan Art Theater Guild
- Release date: 12 April 1966 (Japan)
- Running time: 28 minutes
- Country: Japan

Patriotism or the Rite of Love and Death (憂國, Yūkoku) is a 1966 Japanese short film directed by Yukio Mishima. It is based on Mishima's short story "Patriotism", published in 1960.

== Opening scroll ==
In February 1936, Tokyo was placed under martial law following a coup d'etat executed by a group of young officers. They maintained that they were far more loyal to the emperor than the corrupt cabinet members they murdered. Lieutenant Takeyama was a member of this secret society, but it was decided that he should not participate in this coup d'etat. The others did not want to implicate him, because they knew how much he loved Reiko, his beautiful young bride. It seemed at first that the coup had been successful, but in a few days people began to look on it as a minor uprising soon to be quelled by an imperial injunction. Lieutenant Takeyama was still a member of the palace guard. The time when he would have to fight against his comrade-in-arms, to execute his closest friends as rebels, was drawing near. The Rite of Love and Death takes place on the Japanese Noh stage.

== Plot ==
=== Chapter 1: Reiko ===
Reiko, the lieutenant's wife has seen in her husband's face his resolution to die as he leaves for the palace on the snowy morning following the coup d'etat. If he should fail to return alive, she is determined to follow him in death. As she gathers the keepsakes she will leave behind for her parents and friends, she calls up tender memories of her husband's love...

While sitting under a kanji painting that displays the phrase "wholehearted sincerity" Reiko waits for the lieutenant to return to his abode. She paints a message saying "keepsakes from Reiko" and gathers her cherished figurines. She is aware that when he returns home they are to die together but the agonizing fear is sent away by the eternal bliss of their love. She conjures up the happy memories of their marriage and life together. In her mind, she sees the warm caress of his hands and is warmed by their memory.

=== Chapter 2: The Lieutenant's Return ===
Then at midnight, the snow still falling, Lieutenant Takeyama suddenly appears at the door. The guard has been changed and he explains that he is free until morning, when he must go to kill his comrade-in-arms. "But I just can't do it! I can't!" Takeyama, a dedicated soldier, cannot bear the thought of killing his close friends if he wishes to remain loyal to the emperor. The contradiction appalls him. As the descendant of a samurai family, the only honorable course left him is to die by morning to commit hara-kiri. "I know how you feel" Reiko says quietly. "And I will follow you wherever you go." Takeyama is overjoyed. "Thank you. We'll go together to another world then. But please let me die first and then you follow. I mustn't fail." Their involuntary smiles reflect an unfathomable mutual trust. Death is no longer terrifying. Reiko feels as she did on her wedding night.

After participating in the Ni Ni Roku Incident of February 1936, Lieutenant Shinji Takeyama has been given orders to execute some of his fellow mutineers. Realizing he can not do it, he tells his wife of his plan to commit suicide. She agrees with him and they plan to commit it together.

=== Chapter 3: The Final Love ===
This is as pure and passionate as a ritual conducted before the gods. They are able for the first time in their lives to reveal unabashedly their most secret desires and passions. First the Lieutenant and then Reiko, who has lost all her shyness in the face of death, bids loving farewell to every smallest detail of the other's flesh.

Accepting that they are about to die, Reiko and the Lieutenant make love. They are sent together in the deepest of ecstasies. As they copulate, Reiko kisses the flesh of the Lieutenant and many sensual shots show closeups of their naked bodies entwined. It's an abstract montage of faces, arms, and torsos in sometimes extreme close-up, recalling slightly Teshigahara. The scene ends with them both reclined naked like Grecian statues.

=== Chapter 4: The Lieutenant commits Hara-kiri ===
The lieutenant commits hara-kiri with the assistance of his wife Reiko. As he stabs himself with the sword, spit forms in his mouth and his stomach lets loose a torrent of blood and entrails.

=== Chapter 5: Reiko commits suicide ===
Reiko now prepares herself to follow her husband into the next life. She puts on her lipstick and then sits next to her husband's corpse. She holds the knife with a smile on her face, glad to be reunited with her husband. The film ends with a shot of the dead couple in embrace.

== Style ==
Patriotism is a silent, thirty-minute black-and-white film with long expository intertitles elaborating on the story and its historical background. It contains visual references to Noh theatre, as Mishima admired the traditional style and wrote several plays in the genre. Set in a single room, it is composed of static wide shots and lingering close-ups, most of which obscure Mishima's eyes. It is arresting visually: with cinematographer Watanabe Kimio, Mishima achieves an extremely sharp contrast of black and white, emblazoned by the ensuing copious amounts of blood, and the whiteness of the Noh stage and Reiko's ceremonial kimono, respectively.

The hanging painting that displays "Wholesome sincerity" also acts as a major visual element of the film's visual style, determining angle, lighting, actor positions. Like the entire film itself, it remains mute but steady, fixed in its resolve. It serves to remind the viewer of the devotion between Reiko and the Lieutenant and also their devotion to their nation and to the ritual hara-kiri.

== Themes ==
The film is about the death of militarism in postwar Japan and seeks to contrast the suicide of the 1936 officers to Mishima's postwar interpretation. It can be seen as a foreshadowing of his own ill-fated suicide. Ritual suicide is explored in many of Mishima's works. Following Mishima's death aesthetics, the excruciating gory shots of death make the point, so that an overwhelming sense of life, beauty, discipline, love, and death come together.

== Cast ==
- Yukio Mishima as Lieutenant Shinji Takeyama
- Yoshiko Tsuruoka as Reiko

== Release ==
Patriotism was originally distributed in Japan by Japan Art Theatre Guild on 12 April 1966, where it was shown alongside French film Diary of a Chambermaid directed by Luis Buñuel. It was released theatrically again by Toho and Japan Art Theatre Guild on 15 June 1966.

The film was shot in two days in secret, and after a private screening, then submitted for a French film festival.

On November 25, 1970, Mishima committed seppuku after delivering a speech intended to inspire a coup d'état. After Mishima's suicide his widow Yōko requested that all existing copies of the film be destroyed. But in 2005 the original negatives were discovered in perfect condition, in a tea box at a warehouse at their home in Tokyo. The film was released on DVD in Japan in 2006 and then in the US by the Criterion Collection in 2008.

== In other media ==
The band Laibach used a clip from this film in their music video "Le Privileges des morts" from the album Kapital interspersed alongside Jean-Luc Godard's Alphaville.
