= Death in Midsummer and Other Stories =

Collection of stories by Yukio Mishima

- Author: Yukio Mishima
- Language: English
- Publisher: New Directions
- Publication place: United States
- English publication date: 1966
- Media type: Print

Death in Midsummer and Other Stories is a 1966 collection of English translations of stories by Japanese writer Yukio Mishima. The book takes its name from the included short story of the same title.

== Contents ==
- "Death in Midsummer" – During a vacation at Izu Peninsula, a young couple's two elder children and the husband's sister die in a bathing accident. The wife is torn between feelings of guilt, the longing for sympathy for her loss, and fear for her youngest child, leading to confrontations between her and her husband. Translated by Edward G. Seidensticker.
- "Three Million Yen" – A young working-class couple roams a department store, trying to kill time until they meet with an unknown woman. They discuss their finances, and reveal they are saving up so they can someday raise a child together. When they finally meet the unknown woman, their conversation insinuates that the couple are being paid to have sex in front of upper-class clientele. Translated by Edward G. Seidensticker.
- "Thermos Flasks" – A man passing through San Francisco after a long business trip encounters a former geisha lover, and they spend the night together. On his return to Japan, he realises by indirect means that he is not the only one who has been unfaithful. Translated by Edward G. Seidensticker.
- "The Priest of Shiga Temple and His Love" – This fairy tale, set against the background of Pure Land Buddhism, concerns a venerable priest who falls in love with an Imperial Concubine after a single glance and loses his grip on enlightenment. Translated by Ivan Morris.
- "The Seven Bridges" – On the night of the September full moon, four women, Koyumi, Masako, Kanako and Mina, set out to cross seven bridges without stopping or speaking, in the hope that the Moon will grant their wishes. Translated by Donald Keene.
- "Patriotism" – After the failure of their coup d'état, Lt. Shinji Takeyama, one of the young officers involved in the February 26 incident, commits seppuku (ritual suicide) in the presence of his soon-to-follow wife. Translated by Geoffrey W. Sargent.
- Dōjōji – A "modern Nō play" based on an old play of the same name. The auction of an immense wardrobe with a bell carved on the front is interrupted by a dancer, Kiyoko, who tells a bizarre tale of its sinister past. Translated by Donald Keene.
- "Onnagata" – Mangiku, an onnagata (male theatre actor who takes female roles), meekly submits to the instructions of a modernist director. Translated by Donald Keene.
- "The Pearl" – The loss of one of Mrs. Sasaki's pearls during the course of her 43rd birthday party eventually causes two of her friends to fall out and another two to make up. Translated by Geoffrey W. Sargent.
- "Swaddling Clothes" – A young woman is haunted by the sight of a newborn baby wrapped in newspaper. Translated by Ivan Morris.

== Background ==
Some stories had appeared previously in Cosmopolitan, Esquire, Harper's Bazaar, Japan Quarterly, and Today's Japan. "The Priest of Shiga Temple and His Love" appeared in the UNESCO collection Modern Japanese Stories.

A British edition appeared the following year, published by Secker & Warburg.

"Manatsu no shi" ("Death in Midsummer") was also the name of a collection of Mishima short stories published by Sōgensha in 1953. Apart from the title story, the contents of the 1953 Japanese and the 1966 English anthology are not identical. (Note: The 1953 Japanese edition contains the stories "Death in Midsummer" (眞夏の死, Manatsu no shi), "Kurosuwādo pazuru" (クロスワード・パズル), "Bishin" (美神), "Tsubasa" (翼), "Tada hodo takai mono wa nai" (只ほど高いものはない), and "Sotoba Komachi" (卒塔婆小町).)
