= Patriotism (short story) =

Short story by Yukio Mishima

- Short story by Yukio Mishima
- Original title: Yūkoku
- Translator: Geoffrey W. Sargent
- Country: Japan
- Language: Japanese

Publication
- Published in: Shōsetsu Chūōkōron
- Publisher: Chūōkōron-sha
- Media type: Print
- Publication date: December 1960
- Published in English: 1966

"Patriotism" (憂国, Yūkoku) is a short story by Japanese writer Yukio Mishima. It was first published in the January 1961 (cover date) winter issue of Shōsetsu Chūōkōron (小説中央公論), which was published by Chūōkōron-sha in December 1960.

== Plot ==
The story of Patriotism centers around the experiences of Lieutenant Shinji Takeyama and his young wife, Reiko, and their ritualistic suicide following the February 26 Incident, a mutiny by members of the Imperial Japanese Army in 1936. Their suicide is discussed in brief at the very beginning of the story, and then followed by an introduction to the characters and their daily lives.

The focus of the story revolves around three days, beginning on February 26, and ending on February 28, 1936. On the morning of the 26th, the lieutenant leaves in a hurry to the sound of a bugle; he does not return until the evening of the 28th. When he does return, he tells his wife of the mutiny in the army ranks, and that the following morning, he will be in command of a unit ordered to attack the mutineers. Most of these mutineers are friends of his.

Unable to choose between loyalty to the Emperor and loyalty to his comrades, he informs his wife that he will kill himself that evening, and she immediately requests to accompany him in his endeavour. He asks her to be a witness to his own suicide, and she agrees.

The lieutenant kills himself by seppuku later that same evening which is described in a violent and lyrical display, typical of Mishima's literary style.

The writing reflects on the interlacing of mundanity and beauty, as the intensity of passion that the husband and wife share for one another is related to the description of the couple in the photograph taken at their wedding. It is a recurring reference throughout the story.

== Background ==
Patriotism was written in the autumn of 1960, shortly after the Anpo protests, which were said to have prompted Mishima's public turn towards right-wing politics. The contradictory nature of Mishima's upbringing and the social context of Japan during the time in which he wrote Patriotism also motivated him to take a larger political stance in his writing. Mishima's upbringing in a samurai family and Imperial Japan engrained samurai philosophy in his world view. One of the most defining of these values that later influenced Mishima was the samurai's loyalty to their lord and country. These values revolve around the principles of Bushido (武士道), a supposed moral code of conduct for samurais that influenced nationalism until its abandonment in the second World War. Bushido is said to contain a set of eight principles of justice, courage, mercy, respect, honesty, honor, loyalty, and self-control, which can be seen being reflected in the short story. The shift from Imperial Japan to a Westernized Japan after World War II as a result of United States occupation and reconstruction of Japan from 1945-1952, introduced Western values and beliefs to Japanese society that in some ways contradicted those of Imperial Japan. This shift in belief would ultimately become the motivation for Mishima's later works, including Patriotism and The Sea of Fertility tetralogy.

The character 憂 (yū) actually means "worry" or "concern", and though Yūkoku is translated as "patriotism", the word bears with it a meaning more congruent with "concern for one's country" rather than patriotism directly.

"Patriotism" was later included alongside "Star" and 百万円煎餅 ("Hyakuman'en senbei") in the short story collection スタア (Sutā), which was published on 30 January 1961 by Shinchosha. It was translated into English in 1966. Mishima later grouped it together with the play Toka no Kiku and Eirei no Koe in a single volume, the Ni Ni Roku Trilogy.

A film of the same title, based on the short story, was released in 1966, co-directed by Yukio Mishima and Masaki Domoto.
