= Prelude to the Mishima Incident =

Buildup to the November 1970 Mishima Incident

The Prelude to the Mishima Incident explains the process leading up to the November 1970 Mishima Incident, including the relationship between Mishima and the Japan Ground Self-Defense Force that started in 1966, and the founding of the Tatenokai, and the failure of plans to turn the Self-Defense Forces into a national army by taking advantage of the Anpo protests.

This ariticle details that Mishima's statements and actions in the years leading up to the incident, as well as the path of the activities of the Tatenokai organization, along with the historical background of the time. It is said that the essence of the Mishima Incident cannot be grasped without outlining these historical facts, and that examining the processes and factors involved is of great importance.

== Buildup ==
=== 1966 (Shōwa 41) ===
Mishima had been expressing a desire to join the Japan Self-Defense Forces for a trial period since around 1965. And, in the "flourishing mid-Shōwa period" (昭和元禄, Shōwa-Genroku), in June 1966, he published a short story, Voices of the Fallen Heroes, of which the souls of young officers who had executed in the February 26 Incident, and young soldiers who had died as Kamikaze pilots during the Pacific War cursing the Emperor Hirohito for renouncing his own divinity after Japan's defeat in World War II.

In August, Mishima visited Ōmiwa Shrine in Sakurai-shi, Nara Prefecture, where he practiced being hit by the waterfall for several days, to research Runaway Horses, the second novel in The Sea of Fertility tetralogy, depicts the reincarnation of protagonists who dying at the age of 20, and then visited the Japan Maritime Self-Defense Force 1st Service School (海上自衛隊第1術科学校) in Etajima-shi, Hiroshima Prefecture. He read the suicide notes of the kamikaze pilots at the Education Reference Museum in there and was deeply moved by the simple and solemn writings of these nameless young men. After that, he traveled to Kumamoto Prefecture, where he research Shinkai Daijingu Shrine (新開大神宮) and Sakurayama Shrine (桜山神社), places associated with the Shinpūren rebellion, with Seishi Araki's guidance, and purchased a Japanese sword worth 100,000 yen. He also met with the widow Toshiko (敏子) of the late Zenmei Hasuda, who was his boyhood mentor.

Mishima began to strongly desire to join the JSDF around the autumn just before he began writing Runaway Horses, and from around October he approached the Ministry of Defense about his desire to join the JSDF on a trial basis, but was turned down. So after that, he asked Chikao Kanō (狩野近雄), a managing director of the Mainichi Newspapers Co., to act as an intermediary, and contacted Yoshio Miwa (三輪良雄), administrative vice-minister of the Ministry of Defense, and Iwaichi Fujiwara, a former Lieutenant General, and others, asking for their help.

On December 19, after hearing from Kaisaku Ozawa (小澤開作) about some young men preparing to launch a Minzoku-ha magazine, Fusao Hayashi introduced one of them, Kiyoshi Bandai (万代潔) who was a disciple of Kiyoshi Hiraizumi and a graduate of Meiji Gakuin University, to Mishima's home. Also in the same month, Hiroshi Funasaka (舩坂弘) donated a Japanese sword, "Seki Magoroku" (関孫六), to Mishima as a return gift of appreciation for writing the preface to Funasaka's book, The Scream of the Heroic Spirits that published December 10.

=== 1967 (Shōwa 42) ===
On January 5, 1967, the Minzoku-ha monthly magazine Controversy Journal (論争ジャーナル, Ronsō Journal) was launched, and on 11 same month, editor-in-chief Kazuhiko Nakatsuji (中辻和彦) who was a disciple of Kiyoshi Hiraizumi and a graduate of Meiji Gakuin University, he along with deputy editor-in-chief Kiyoshi Bandai visited Mishima at home to ask for his contributions. Mishima decided to contribute to the magazine for free, and from then on, the two visited him once every three days.

Mishima told the two young men with a serious expression, "Ever since I wrote Voices of the Fallen Heroes, I feel as if the spirit of Asaichi Isobe has possessed me." Another day, he unsheathed his Japanese sword and said, "A Katana is not something merely to be admired. It is a living entity. With this living blade, I must expose the deception of the intellectuals in the 1960 Japan-U.S. Security Treaty struggle (60年安保闘争)."

On January 27, Hiroshi Mochimaru (持丸博), a Waseda University student and a member of the "Japan Students' League" (日本学生同盟, Nihon Gakusei Dōmei) (abbreviated name, 日学同, Nichigakudō), also visited Mishima. He asked for contribute an article to the Japan Student Newspaper (日本学生新聞, Nihon Gakusei Shimbun), which the Nichigakudō would launch the following month. Mochimaru was also a disciple of Kiyoshi Hiraizumi, along with Nakatsuji and Bandai, and was a staff member of the Controversy Journal.

Around this time that Mishima met these young people who shared their worrying about the future of Japan, he told Kikue Kojima (小島喜久江), an editor in charge of Shinchosha, "I feel like it's scary. What I wrote in my novel has appeared as a fact. But on the other hand, sometimes facts come before fictions."

Also, around this time, Mishima learned that people related to scholarship and the arts in China (including the people who had guided and entertained actors from the Bungakuza theatre troupe when they visited China) were being treated badly by Mao Zedong. Feeling a sense of mission that Japan, a geographically close neighbor, should take the lead in protesting, he expressed his support for efforts to restore the original autonomy of Chinese scholarship and the arts (including classical studies). He then held a press conference together with Yasunari Kawabata, Jun Ishikawa, and Kōbō Abe to issue a statement in protest against the "Cultural Revolution", an oppression carried out by Mao Zedong, the Chinese Communist government. However, most newspapers at the time gave their statements just brief mention, the only newspaper to report the full text of the statement was the Tokyo Shimbun.

In March, Mishima was granted permission to join the JGSDF on a trial basis, on the condition that he return home every one or two weeks, and he enlisted alone under his real name, "Kimitake Hiraoka" (平岡公威)," for 46 days from April 12 to May 27. During the enlisting, Mishima was first assigned to the JGSDF Officer Candidate School (陸上自衛隊幹部候補生学校) in Kurume-shi, Fukuoka Prefecture. After leaving the school on April 19, he went to the JGSDF Fuji School (陸上自衛隊富士学校) in Suntō-gun, Shizuoka Prefecture, where he experienced mountain trekking and camping at Lake Yamanaka, then joined the Fuji School Advanced Officer Course (AOC), where received instruction from Captain Katsuo Kikuchi (菊地勝夫).

Around mid-April or late that year, Mishima was told by Iwaichi Fujiwara, "Let me show you how young JSDF officers live," and was shown around the rented house of Fujiwara's son-in-law, Hikaru Tomizawa (冨澤暉), and a few days later, he dined with Tomizawa and about five of his Fuji school classmates. At the dinner, Mishima spoke of his plan for a coup d'état, which he proposed to take advantage of the JGSDF' deployment to take power when the police alone could no longer suppress left-wing student demonstrations, but Tomizawa replied, "We won't do anything illegal like that." At that moment, Mishima's face changed color, and an expression of hatred appeared on his face, as if he thought, "This town isn't big enough for the both of us. (倶に天を戴かず, Tomo ni ten wo itadakazu)." (Note: A literal translation would be, "We cannot live under the same sky.")

After May 11, Mishima joined the Ranger Course, and then transferred to the Narashino 1st Airborne Brigade in Funabashi-shi, Chiba Prefecture, where he experienced basic training (except parachute training). In an interview shortly after his first solo enlistment in the JSDF, Mishima answered the following about defense of Japan:

I believe that my ideas are neither militaristic nor fascist. All I want is for the national army to be placed in its proper position as a national army. It is to establish the right balance between the national army and the public. (Omitted)
The most important thing that the government should do is not to simply maintain the security system or to allow the security treaty to be extended. It is to clearly distinguish and promote the American defense capability under the collective security system and the value of the independent right of Japan's self-defense. For example, even under the security treaty, it is necessary to clarify the "limits" of which in what cases to enter into the collective security system and in what cases the JSDF will defend Japan through the own power of ethnic and national.

— Yukio Mishima, 26 Questions to Returning Mishima Soldier

Mishima further talked in this interview, "I don't know whether it is the present system or His Majesty's wishes that dictate this, but when I heard that His Majesty would be standing aside to welcome foreign envoys at Haneda, avoiding the JSDF' honor guard, I felt an indescribable pathetic feeling."

The members of the Controversy Journal group and the Japan Students' League expressed to Mishima their desire to join the JGSDF for a trial period. Mishima made serious plans to set up a militia organization, and through Hiroshi Mochimaru, requested the cooperation of the Waseda University National Defense Club (formed in April). Thus, a three-way relationship between the Controversy Journal group, the Japan Students' League, and Mishima gradually took shape.

On June 19, Mishima met for the first time the representatives of the Waseda University National Defense Club, including Masakatsu Morita, a student at Waseda University's Faculty of Education and a member of the Japan Students' League, on meeting held at the coffee shop "Victoria" in Roppongi, Minato-ku, (Note: Some source says that "Victoria" was located in Ginza 8-chōme, Chūō-ku.) and decided on the date for the Waseda University National Defense Club's trial enlistment in the JGSDF. (Note: Morita's diary recorded that first meeting took place between Mishima and the representatives of the Waseda University National Defense Club, of which he was a representative too, but did not mention his impression of Mishima at the meeting, so some has guessed that Morita may not have attended. However, it is also said that an element that cannot be overlooked is that Morita's diary written three days later contained a thought that he shared with Mishima: "What does it mean to be Japanese? Perhaps the Japanese are able to die in the best possible way at any time.")

For one week from July 2, 13 members of Waseda University's National Defense Club enlisted at the JGSDF Camp Kita-Eniwa (北恵庭駐屯地) in Eniwa-shi, Hokkaido for a trial period. Morita wrote about his impressions at the time, angrily saying, "Even so, can't something be done about the trend of JSDF personnel turning into salaried workers, who say they are doing this to get a large automobile (大型自動車, ōgata jidōsha) license or to be advantageous when changing jobs?" He also wrote that it was unfortunate that JSDF personnel "don't want to talk much about the Article 9 of the Japanese Constitution" and that "there is no person who has made it clear that they want to stage a coup." Morita was a young man who had recited with deep affection Tokutomi Sohō's tanka poem, "I wonder who is my lover, it is the country of Japan, God created," which he had learned from a senior at university.

In August, Mishima solidified a concrete plan to train young people who would become the core of the National Defense Force, and met with Keizō Shigematsu (重松惠三) of the JGSDF personnel on September 9 for implement regular trial enlistments in the JGSDF. On September 26, Mishima departed Haneda Airport on a Japan Airlines flight to India to do research for his novel The Temple of Dawn. He met up with a police bureaucrat Atsuyuki Sassa (佐々淳行), who had been stationed in Hong Kong and had known him since his youth, at Kai Tak Airport, and he told Sassa that he wanted to form a private national army to defend Japan against surrounding communist nations and asked for his cooperation. However, Sassa asked Mishima to cooperate in strengthening security measures as an opinion leader, and discouraged his idea of creating a private army.

That August, around the anniversary of the bombing, Mishima condemned the U.S. atomic strike on Hiroshima as history's worst "massacre", and stated that the only words that properly expressed the national indignation felt by the Japanese against the atomic bombing were the passage in Emperor Shōwa's Imperial Rescript on the Termination of the War, "I am in agony that rends the internal organs" (五内為ニ裂ク, godai tame ni saku). He also argued that, as a country that continues to be exposed to the nuclear threat of neighboring countries in the future, Japan alone, as a country that was atomic bombed, cannot be surviving without getting hands dirty (without possessing dirty nuclear weapons), and that of all the countries in the world, "the only one that can be produce nuclear weapons without any remorse of conscience is our Japan, the only country that has been atomic bombed. Shouldn't we cope with the new nuclear age with glorious privilege?"

On October 5, Mishima met with Prime Minister Indira Gandhi, President Zakir Husain, and an army colonel in India, and expressed on Japanese newspaper, a sense of crisis about Japan's lack of national defense awareness against the threat of the Chinese Communist Party. In there, he likened Japan's lazy nature that currently slumbering, to the grasshopper in summer in the story of The Ant and the Grasshopper.

After returning to Japan, in November, Mishima discussed a draft plan for a militia organization called the "Japan National Guard" (祖国防衛隊, Sokoku Bōeitai) with members of the Controversy Journal group and began preparing the pamphlet on the "Japan National Guard" concept. On December 5, he test-flew an F-104 fighter jet from the Japan Air Self-Defense Force's Hyakuri Air Base. At the end of December, Colonel Kiyokatsu Yamamoto (山本舜勝), head of the Information Education Section at the JGSDF Intelligence School (JGSDF Kodaira School) (陸上自衛隊調査学校) in Kodaira-shi, who had been shown Mishima's "Japan National Guard" concept pamphlet by his former superior, Iwaichi Fujiwara, dined with Mishima at a traditional authentic Japanese restaurant Ryōtei in Akasaka through Fujiwara's offices. At that time, the influence of communist forces from the Soviet Union and China was growing in Japan.

Colonel Yamamoto asked Mishima, an author who was widely rumored to be a candidate for the Nobel Prize in Literature, "as a man of letters, you should devote yourself to writing, and isn't it possible to achieve your goals through writing?" Mishima answered decisively with a sharp stare, looking straight into Yamamoto's eyes, "I've given up on writing. I don't have the slightest interest in the Nobel Prize."

At that moment, a spark ran down Colonel Yamamoto's spine, convinced that "he's serious about this," and while he felt he could work with Mishima, he also felt that he shouldn't make such big claims to this man, and shouldn't promise him the moon. (Note: Colonel Yamamoto also talked that Mishima had said, "I've given up on writing," and then, "Mr. Tsuneari Fukuda will be able to fulfill the role you are speaking of.") According to Hiroshi Mochimaru, Mishima was extremely excited after meeting Colonel Yamamoto and said, "He's an expert on urban guerrilla warfare. He's the perfect person for our organization. Let's meet him together."

However, around this time a rift began to form between the member of the Controversy Journal group, who fully supported the idea of a "Japan National Guard," and the leaders of Japan Students' League, Hidetoshi Saitō (斉藤英俊) and Miyazaki Masahiro (宮崎正弘), who were shown reluctance about the idea's "radical overtones colors" and the image of Mishima's private army, and Hiroshi Mochimaru, Yoshio Itō (伊藤好雄), Tetsuho Miyazawa (宮沢徹甫), Tsutomu Abe (阿部勉) and others were expelled from Japan Students' League, and joined the Controversy Journal group. Mochimaru became deputy editor of the magazine Controversy Journal together with Mishima.

=== 1968 (Shōwa 43) ===
On February 25, 1968, eleven people including Yukio Mishima, Kazuhiko Nakatsuji, Kiyoshi Bandai, Hiroshi Mochimaru, Yoshio Itō, Tetsuho Miyazawa, and Tsutomu Abe created a blood oath (血盟状, ketsumei-jou) at the Ikuseisha (育誠社)'s Controversy Journal office in the Kokaji Building (小鍛冶ビル) on Ginza 8-chōme, Chūō-ku. Mishima wrote in large letters in sumi ink (墨), "Pledge: February 25, 1968, We pledge to become a cornerstone for the Imperial Nation (皇国, Koukoku) with the spirit of the samurai, that the pride of the males of Yamato (大和)," and each person signed with blood collected from pricking their little fingers with a razor. Mishima signed using his real name, "Kimitake Hiraoka" (平岡公威).

At that time, Mishima said, "Even if written in blood, a paper will fly away if you blow on it. But the promise we have made here will live forever. Let's all drink this blood together." And before he was about to drink it himself, he made everyone laugh by saying, "Hey, anyone here who has a contagious disease, raise your hand," and then they all drank together. They had put salt in the blood to prevent it from solidifying.

For one month from March 1, the Controversy Journal group, headed by Hiroshi Mochimaru, enlisted with Mishima at the Camp Takigahara of the JGSDF Fuji School for a trial enlistment in the JGSDF. Just before the event, five students from Chuo University were unable to attend due to the end of their strike, so Mochimaru asked Jun Yano (矢野潤) of the Japan Students' League to help out in their place, and in response, Masakatsu Morita enlisted a week late. Mishima was impressed and took notice of Morita's efforts to participate in the arduous training despite the fact that he had broken his right leg while skiing during spring break and was undergoing treatment.

On March 30, after the grueling trial enlistment had ended without incident and they said goodbye to their chief instructor and the JSDF personnel with "manly tears," Morita and the other students traveled by chartered bus to Mishima's residence in Minami Magome (南馬込), Ōta-ku, Tokyo, where they were invited to a thank-you homemade Chinese dinner. Morita, who became one of the 1st generation members of Mishima's militia "Japan National Guard", sent a letter of thanks to Mishima by express mail, saying, "I would give my life for you, Sensei, any time." Mishima responded by telling Morita, "That your one sentence moved me more than any letter of thanks filled with flowery language." Morita also was active in the movement to return the Northern Territories to Japan at that time.

Around this time, Mishima had been consulting businessperson Aichi Yora (与良ヱ) to get support from the political and business world for his plan of create the big militia organization "Japan National Guard" joined with 10,000 members from key industries. He then began to contact Takeshi Sakurada (桜田武), executive board member (常任理事, Jōnin riji) of the Japan Business Federation, and others through Hiroshi Mochimaru, and had his first meeting with Sakurada. However, he was unable to get approval, and was advised by a person of the JSDF to persuade Sakurada through Yoshio Miwa, he conveyed to Miwa accordingly on March 18.

In early April, with the help of Seibu Department Stores director, Seiji Tsutsumi, the uniforms designed by Tsukumo Igarashi (五十嵐九十九), the designer in charge of military uniforms for Charles de Gaulle, were completed. Mishima had given detailed instructions for the design of the uniforms in advance, and the crest on the caps was designed to combine two types of Kabutos. To celebrate this, Mishima visited Atago Shrine (愛宕神社) in Ōme-shi, wearing the uniforms along with 11 members of the "Japan National Guard" (1st generation members), mainly from the Controversy Journal group, and had a commemorative photograph taken under the cherry trees in full bloom, with cherry blossoms showers (桜吹雪, sakura fubuki) falling all around them.

In the middle of the same month, Mishima had a four-way meeting with Takeshi Sakurada, Yoshio Miwa, and Iwaichi Fujiwara. Sakurada showed more understanding than the previous time, and instructed that the militia be given a safe name, "Trial Enlistment Club," and it was agreed that only the core members of the executive ranks would be left nameless and would have the mission of the "Japan National Guard." Around this time, signs advertising "Trial Enlistment" were placed on the Waseda University campus, and a wide range of personnel were sought, with Mochimaru conducting the first round of interviews for students who applied.

On April 29, Emperor Shōwa's birthday, Mishima hosted a luncheon for his friend Takeshi Muramatsu (村松剛) at the Takanawa Prince Hotel to showcase the members of the "Japan National Guard". About 10 members, dressed in uniform, appeared one after another from behind a gold folding screen, lined up, and sang the team song, which Mishima had penned, followed by a parody of the song Do-Re-Mi that played a prank on their captain, Mishima. Mishima's face was filled with joy and happiness.

Starting in May, Colonel Kiyokatsu Yamamoto began intensive lectures and training support for core members of the "Japan National Guard," and in his lecture on the 27, he covered the "Noshiro Incident" (能代事件) that occurred in April 1963, in which a body believed to be that of a North Korean agent was washed up on the beach at Asanai (浅内) in Noshiro-shi, Akita Prefecture. Upon learning that this incident had been treated as a simple case of illegal immigration due to some pressure and had been left unresolved, Mishima gazed upon a photograph of the drowned agent's body and became enraged, saying, "Why is something so serious being left unaddressed and ignored?"

On June 1, Mishima and the core members, under the guidance of Colonel Yamamoto, conducted a comprehensive exercise in anti-guerrilla tactics (stakeout, infiltration, tailing, disguise, etc.) in the city. Disguised as a laborer, Mishima carried out his mission and made it to Tamahime Park (玉姫公園) in San'ya, Taitō-ku without being detected. Colonel Yamamoto was deeply moved by Mishima's exhausted but serious appearance. On the 15 of the same month, the "All-Japan Student National Defense Council" (全日本学生国防会議) was formed, with Masakatsu Morita as its first chairman. Mishima gave a congratulatory speech for Morita on the founding meeting at the Arcadia Ichigaya Shigaku Kaikan (市ヶ谷私学会館) in Ichigaya, shouting "Banzai!" (万歳) three times, and even accompanied him in a taxi during the demonstration, cheering him on from the window.

Around this time, Mishima published On the Defense of Culture (文化防衛論, Bunka bōei-ron), in which he touched upon the postwar Japanese culture that had become shallow and harmless, with no passion and no deepening of poetry, just like, "a cultural property shared by humanity," "something like a fountain in a plaza," and "a dead culture like a museum." In relation to the decline of this "Chrysanthemum" (elegant art), he talked the "Emperor as a cultural concept," which symbolizes the bond between the "Sword" (martial spirit) and the "Chrysanthemum," which had been severed, and the non-detachability of the two.

"Miyabi" was the cultural essence of the imperial court and was something people longing for, but in times of emergency, "Miyabi" even took the form of terrorism. In other words, the Emperor as a cultural concept was not only on the side of state power and order, but also hold out the hand to the side of anarchy. When state power and order placed the nation and the ethnic in a state of separation, the Emperor as a cultural concept acted as a principle of change that sought to restore the "non-detachability between the nation and the ethnic." The samurai who rose up in the Sakuradamon Incident in response to the Divine will (大御心, Ōmigokoro) of Emperor Kōmei carried out "a ray of Miyabi," and an uprising for the emperor should have been tolerated as long as it did not go against cultural customs. However, the Shōwa era imperial system, which clung to a Western-style constitutional monarchy, had lost the ability to understand the "Miyabi" of the February 26 Incident.

— Yukio Mishima, On the Defense of Culture

The second trial enlistment, led by Mishima to the new students, took place at the Camp Takigahara of the JGSDF Fuji School from July 25 until August 23. At this second time, Masayoshi Koga (小賀正義) and Hiroyasu Koga, both students of Kanagawa University and the members of "National Student Council" (全国学生協議会) that was countered New Left "Zengakuren" and "Zenkyōtō", participated through an introduction by Kuninori Itō (伊藤邦典), a 1st generation member, and they became the 2nd generation members of Mishima's militia "Japan National Guard."

On the other hand, the support and cooperation from Takeshi Sakurada was ridiculed with a half-hearted way, and in the end, Sakurada gave Mishima 3 million yen, as if it were throwing tip coins, saying, "You shouldn't start a private army." Mishima's pride was deeply hurt, and he decided to fund the militia all at his own expense.

Forced to downsize, the militia "Japan National Guard" changed its name to the "Shield Society" (楯の会, Tatenokai), which was inspired by two waka poems: One poem from the Poems of Defenders (防人の歌, Sakimori no uta) series included in the Man'yōshū, and the other one by the poet Tachibana Akemi. (For details, refer to Tatenokai#Origin of the Name)

On October 3, at a teach-in with general students held at Waseda University, Mishima responded that the reason he was so committed to anti-communism was that freedom of speech was not guaranteed, and that while a communist society was touted as being classless, in reality it was a class society with a terrifying power structure of a "huge bureaucracy." And, regarding the postwar Emperor, Mishima stated that Shinzō Koizumi (小泉信三) went too far in his attempts to modernize the Emperor system, resulting in it degenerating into a "Weekly magazine Imperial family" that became the subject of fodder for weekly magazines, and criticized Koizumi for not realizing until his death that his idea, "eliminating the dignity of the Emperor will connect the Emperor with the people" was itself wrong.

On October 5, the official founding ceremony of the "Tatenokai" was held at the National Hall of Education (国立教育会館) in Toranomon, Minato-ku, with Mishima, the first student leader Hiroshi Mochimaru, and other core members. The exact number of members of the Tatenokai at this time, including Mishima, was 47, and 35 of them attended the ceremony. A newspaper scooped the event and reported it in a caricature manner.

On October 21, International Anti-War Day (国際反戦デー), Mishima and the Tatenokai members, Colonel Yamamoto and his students from the JGSDF Research School (JGSDF Kodaira School) infiltrated the Shinjuku riot demonstrations of New Left Zengakuren which opposing the Vietnam War and the U.S.-Japan Security Treaty (Anpo), to understand the situation and to investigate who the leaders of the organizations were. Mishima also had been received lectures from Colonel Yamamoto on "coup d'état studies."

As the air filled with black smoke from Molotov cocktails and Tear gas, Mishima, with bloodshot eyes, remained motionless as he watched the battle between the Riot Police Unit and New Left Zengakuren. The location then shifted to Ginza, and as they watched the fierce urban warfare with stones flying, from the roof of a Kōban, Mishima's body was trembling with excitement, as Colonel Yamamoto, who was standing right next to him, noticed. That same day, the New Left "Socialist Student League" (社会主義学生同盟) also attempted to storm the Ministry of Defense in Roppongi, and the Riot Police Unit fought back with ferocious water cannons, but they were able to break through the main gate.

Anticipating an opportunity for the JSDF's Public Order Deployment (治安出動, Chian shutsudō) to suppress riots of the New Left, Mishima began to conceive a plan for the Tatenokai to act as a raiding force to assist the JSDF in areas they could not reach, and to take advantage of this opportunity to turn the JSDF into a National Army and revise Article 9 of the Japanese Constitution in an extra-legal manner. When Mishima and other members temporarily retreated to their base in Akasaka, Minato-ku, in the early afternoon of that day, Colonel Yamamoto offered Mishima a glass of whiskey he had brought with him, but Mishima replied indignantly, "Huh? What? Drinking alcohol in the situation like this?!" and left the table.

That night, as the turmoil of riot continued, Mishima gathered the members back at their base and asked Colonel Yamamoto if he could hold a meeting there to summarize what had happened that day. Some members pressed Yamamoto, arguing that now was the time to take action, but Yamamoto, seeing no sign of the JSDF's Public Order Deployment would yet be called upon, suggested disbanding the training session for the day. A disappointed Mishima led to move the members of Tatenokai to the National Theatre in Chiyoda-ku.

The following month, in November, Mishima was invited to give a lecture at the National Defense Academy, where he gave the following speech:

I think it's safe to say that the Public Order Deployment is equal to a political condition. Therefore, if the JSDF says, "We won't withdraw," no government can compete with it. So, "Well, what can we do to get you to withdraw?" All we have to do is say, "Amend the constitution and allow the military." This can be done without a coup. I'm not trying to encourage bad thing, but I think that unless you have that kind of determination and guts, you will not be able to carry on as the General of the JSDF in the future. So, rather than trying to move public opinion from afar, we need a General who can take decisive political action when a real opportunity arises.

— Yukio Mishima, Amateur Defense Theory

On November 10, in the midst of university protests, Mishima went to the Tokyo University together with Hiroyuki Agawa to demand the release of Kentarō Hayashi (林健太郎), the dean of the Faculty of Letters, who had been confined in a classroom by the New Left Tokyo University Zenkyōtō. He requested a meeting with Hayashi, but was turned down by the Zenkyōtō.(This confinement incident is called Kentarō Hayashi Confinement Incident (林健太郎監禁事件).)

During a lecture on guerrilla warfare by Colonel Yamamoto on December 21, Mishima asked, "Isn't guerrilla warfare the tactics of the weak, who deceive others?" During a break in the lecture, Masakatsu Morita asked Yamamoto, "Who is the worst person in Japan? Who should we kill to best benefit Japan?" Colonel Yamamoto replied, "You can't kill someone unless you're prepared to die. I still haven't found the true enemy."

At the end of December, core Tatenokai members and Colonel Yamamoto and others gathered at Mishima's residence to explore plans for cooperation between the Tatenokai, Sohgo Security Services Co., Ltd. (now ALSOK Co., Ltd.) (綜合警備保障株式会社), and the Hunters Association (猟友会, Ryōyu kai). The topic soon turned to indirect aggression (unconventional warfare) (間接侵略, Kansetsu sinryaku) that seeking to destroy Japanese traditional culture and lead to a communist revolution within the country, through information and psychological warfare. And Mishima asked, "When exactly will you rise up?" Colonel Yamamoto replied, "It would be when the mob breaks into the Imperial Palace and insults the Emperor, or when the Public Order Deployment is called out." Mishima howling laughed with glee and said, "At that time, I'll be the company commander under you Sir."

Through his contacts with Colonel Yamamoto and former army personnel and high-ranking government officials connected to him, Mishima got a sense of the possibility of calling out the Public Order Deployment, and together with Yamamoto he came up with the following plan for a coup d'état scenario. And Mishima had become a member of the Aogiri Group (青桐グループ), a secret intelligence organization formed by graduates of the JGSDF's counter-psychological intelligence course. The graduates published the pamphlet called Aogiri (青桐) once a year.

If it becomes necessary to mobilize the Public Order Deployment, Mishima and the Tatenokai members will first risk their lives to eliminate the New Left demonstrators, and the special unit in the Eastern area led by myself (Colonel Yamamoto) and my comrades will respond. At this point, the main force of the JSDF's Public Order Deployment will be deployed and restore security in the capital under martial law. In the unlikely event that the demonstrators invade the Imperial Palace, I will use the JSDF helicopters I have on standby to transport the Tatenokai members and we firmly block the demonstrators without missing an opportunity.
At this point, Mishima and ten core members will take responsibility for killing the demonstrators, unsheathe their swords, and commit seppuku with their Japanese swords. As written in Mishima's Counterrevolutionary Manifesto (反革命宣言, Han-kakumei sengen), they "believe that there will be others who will follow us," and will serve their deaths as a foundation stone. The revolutionary drama that begins with the uprising of Mishima and the Tatenokai will be completed by the JSDF that will follow. The JSDF, that succeeded in their coup d'état, will end by gaining recognition as the National Army through constitutional revise.

— Kiyokatsu Yamamoto, Japan Self-Defense Forces "A Unit of Shadow": Confession of a Truth that Killed Yukio Mishima

Lieutenant General H (Eiichi Hirose (広瀬栄一)), who was on friendly terms with the masterminds of the "Sanyū Incident," was seeking an opportunity to stage a coup and had been in contact with Mishima. Lieutenant General H also had connections with the U.S. Army and CIA, and had received approval from the U.S. military for a plan to turn the JSDF into a national army by taking advantage of the Public Order Deployment.

However, Colonel Yamamoto was not sure whether it was appropriate for Mishima and himself to go ahead with the plan head on, even if it meant risking their own lives, and felt that it would be a waste for Mishima, an honest comrade, to lose his life over such a hasty plan. He also felt that Mishima's presence was indispensable in order to work together with him to establish a large-scale civil defense plan based on a long-term perspective, rather than allowing him to be used and die as a sacrificial pawn by the pro-American Lieutenant General H and others. (Note: However, after Mishima's death, Colonel Yamamoto reflected that his large-scale civil defense long term plan that he had thought was good, was not necessarily more realistic than Mishima's vision of a coup d'état as a short-term solution to turn the JSDF into a national army. Yamamoto came to think repeatedly that Mishima's plan to launch a coup d'état on October 21 "may have been a one-in-a-thousand chance, rare opportunity," even if it was somewhat far-fetched. Considering that Japan's pitiful and dangerous situation remained unchanged 30 years later in the year 2000, he came to feel that he had missed their only chance on that time.)

=== 1969 (Shōwa 44) ===
On January 18, 1969, New Left Zenkyōtō students who were on bad terms with the established Left Japanese Communist Party, occupied Yasuda Auditorium at the Tokyo University, opposing tuition fee increases, etc. The incident was called the "University of Tokyo Yasuda Auditorium incident" (東大安田講堂事件). On the 19, Mishima, who had been watching the fierce battle between the Riot Police Unit and the New Left students, feared that if a student was to jump to his death from the clock tower, traditional Japanese spirit that was not afraid of self-sacrifice would be combined with the New Left's communism, and ordinary citizens would sympathize with the New Left. To prevent this from happening, he immediately phone called the Metropolitan Police Department, requesting that they "spray sleeping gas from a helicopter to put us to sleep."

However, Mishima's fears turned out to be unnecessary, and contrary to his expectations, no Tokyo University students were willing to seriously risk their lives. Mishima was relieved and disappointed at the Zenkyōtō students' quick and easy surrender, and eventually came to despise them, realizing that their values were different from his and Tatenokai's own.

On February 1, Masakatsu Morita, who had been the bridge between the Controversy Journal group and the "Japan Students' League", completely leaned toward the Controversy Journal group rather than the "Japan Students' League", and was expelled from the "Japan Students’ League" along with five his friends: Masahiro Ogawa (小川正洋) (Meiji Gakuin University Faculty of Law), Takashi Noda (野田隆史) (Azabu University), Kenichi Tanaka (田中健一) (Asia University Faculty of Law), Tomoaki Tsurumi (鶴見友昭) (Waseda University), and Shunichi Nishio (西尾俊一) (Kokushikan University). (Note: Miyazaki Masahiro (宮崎正弘) of the "Japan Students' League" wrote in the Japan Student Newspaper that the reason Morita and others were expelled was because they "sold their souls to communism.") These six members were known as the "Junisou Group" (十二社グループ), because they used to hang out at the Kobayashi-sō (小林荘) apartment that Tanaka's boarding house in Juunisou (十二社) (now Nishi-Shinjuku 4-chōme), Shinjuku-ku. Six were a group of lone wolves (一匹狼, Ippiki ōkami) who were not afraid to commit acts of terror.

On February 11, Mishima was shocked by the heroic death of Kosaburo Eto, who set himself on fire, leaving behind a suicide note called "Awakening Note" (覚醒書, Kakusei sho), in front of the National Diet Building on that day, National Foundation Day, and wrote, "the one thing art can never reach is a political act like this self-immolation," and felt that the "seriousness" of the 23-year-old young man's actions was "the most powerful criticism of politics as a dream or art."

From February 19 to 23, under the guidance of Colonel Yamamoto, the Tatenokai held a training camp at Shōgetsuin Temple (松月院) in Itabashi-ku, where they underwent special training. In the bitter cold of the main hall, without heating, they had to sleep in sleeping bags at night and eat only canned food that they had brought with them. After everyone had gone to sleep, Yamamoto saw Mishima writing at his desk, breathing out white breath from the cold. Seeing Mishima's earnest figure from behind, Colonel Yamamoto thought, "I don't mind dying with this man."

On February 25, Mishima met with M, a JSDF officer who was a Colonel Yamamoto's classmate of during their time in the Imperial Japanese Army and a collaborator in the Sanyū Incident, at Yamamoto's home. M was deeply sympathetic to the ideas in Mishima's Counterrevolutionary Manifesto, but he disagreed with the part that said "Effectivity is not a concern," stating that "if you take action, it is meaningless unless you win," and argued that the most important thing was the effectiveness of concrete means, such as weapons (tanks, missiles) superior to those of the enemy.

In response, Mishima said, "In that case, your way of posing the problem is completely different," and first explained the importance of the goal of "Protecting Japanese culture," and the metaphorical significance of fighting with a "Japanese sword." He argued, "In fact, risking your own life to go on a suicide run in battle creates more brave persons who follow in your footsteps," and countered the short-sighted, materialistic profit-and-loss arithmetic consciousness that exercises modern military force (Weapon of mass destruction), which can commit mass murder with the flick of a launch button, while remaining in a safe zone where he himself will not be harmed.

We consider ourselves to be the final preservers, ultimate representatives and quintessence of Japanese culture, history, and tradition that must be defended. We are in sharp opposition to any ideas that suggest a "better future society." This is because action for the future denies the maturity of culture, denies the nobility of tradition, and turns the irreplaceable present into a process of revolution.
The kamikaze pilots' principle of action was to make themselves the incarnations of history, to embody the quintessence of history, to embody the aesthetic form of tradition, and to make themselves the last ones. In their wills, the pilots left behind the words, "I believe that there will be others who will follow us." The idea of "I believe that there will be others who will follow us" is truly and logically opposed to the idea of a "better future society." This is because "those who will follow us" are none other than those who act with the belief that they will be the last. Effectivity is not a concern.

— Yukio Mishima, Counterrevolutionary Manifesto

The third trial enlistment, leading by Mishima to the new students, took place at the Camp Takigahara of the JGSDF Fuji School from March 1 to 29. At this time, Masahiro Ogawa, a close friend of Morita, participated in this trial enlistment, becoming a 3rd generation member. From the same month 9 to 15, an advanced refresher course was also held for those who had enlisted before (1st and 2nd generation members). (Note: The refresher course lasted for three days and two nights and was held four times a year in March, June, September and November.) The reality of the Tatenokai, which was known by the public as "Toy soldiers," was that it had become an elite group that even surprised the JSDF officers.

Journalist Henry Scott-Stokes covered the exercise of this March 1969 and published an article in The Times of London. When Stokes asked Morita, who was in the refresher course, why he joined the Tatenokai, he answered that he had decided to follow Mishima because he could grasp the relation between the Emperor and Mishima's mentality. On April 13, Thames Television, a London station that had read Stokes' article, came to cover the April regular meeting of the Tatenokai at Ichigaya Hall (市ヶ谷会館) and filmed the training. Mishima invited Stokes and Thames Television reporter Peter Taylor to his home.

On April 28, "Okinawa Day" (沖縄デー) (the day the Treaty of San Francisco came into effect in 1952), Mishima and Colonel Yamamoto observed the guerrilla activities and violent whirling demonstrations of the New Left Zengakuren. Afterwards, Mishima took Colonel Yamamoto to the National Theatre facing the Imperial Palace, where he guided an elevator to the basement abyss under the stage and said, "This basement is managed by a trusted friend of mine. Please feel free to use it any time."

In the same month, as a tentative plan in light of the current circumstances in which constitutional reform is difficult, Mishima delivered Bisection of JSDF Theory (自衛隊二分論, Jieitai nibun ron), in which he proposed a tentative plan to form the two forces that were the "United Nations Police Reserve Force" out of 90% of the JASDF, 70% of the JMSDF, and 10% of the JGSDF as an international military linked to the collective security system through the Security Treaty with the United States, and the "National Defense Force" made up of 90% of the JGSDF, 30% of the JMSDF, 10% of the JASDF, and a large number of militias includes the Tatenokai, as an independent military that would pledge loyalty to the Emperor and not conclude military treaties with any foreign country, with its primary mission being indirect invasion.

Mishima had been trying to find allies among the young JSDF officers he had met during his trial enlistment training, and some officers who agreed with Mishima had begun to appear around this time. One of them, upon hearing Mishima's remark that he did not understand Colonel Yamamoto's true intentions, telephone called Yamamoto in a strong tone, saying, "If you have changed your mind, we will not remain silent, so please be prepared for that!"

Mishima, who had sought to interact with and deepen friendships with officers who had graduated from the National Defense Academy, had been under pressure from the Ministry of Defense's Internal bureau (内局, nai-kyoku) in various forms since around spring, leading to restrictions being placed on Tatenokai's training. Mishima, who had been searching for ways to act in unison between the public and private sectors, was increasingly irritated by the JSDF's internal pressure on him, and although he did not publicly criticize the JSDF, among the members of Tatenokai there was repeated reviling of the Ministry of Defense's Internal Bureau.

On May 11, Mishima, Colonel Yamamoto, and other senior officers of the JSDF met for dinner at the buddhist vegetarian cuisine (精進料理, Shōjin ryōri) restaurant "Daigo" (醍醐) in the grounds of Seishōji Temple (青松寺) (the Bodaiji of Mishima's grandfather, Sadatarō Hiraoka) in Atago, Minato-ku, to analyze the situation of the New Left's struggle for liberated zone (解放区, kaihō-ku) and national defense issues. At this time, Mishima asked Yamamoto if there was a suitable place for crossbow training.

On May 13, Mishima was invited to attend a debate organized by the New Left Zenkyōtō, held in a classroom at the University of Tokyo Faculty of Liberal arts (教養学部, kyouyō gakubu) in Komaba campus, where he engaged in a heated debate with New Left students. The Metropolitan Police Department had offered Mishima protection in advance, but he declined, saying that he did not need any acquaintances or the Tatenokai members to accompany him, and proceeded alone to the enemy camp with a tantō and an iron fan (鉄扇, tessen) hidden in his haramaki. It had been rumored that the Zenkyōtō had boasted that they would "defeat Mishima, strand him, strip him, and force him to commit seppuku on stage," so the core Tatenokai members went to the venue without telling Mishima, and in order to protect him in case of an emergency, they impersonated general audience and hid in the second row from the front, and plainclothes detectives were also secretly watching to the debate at the venue. In the debate, Mishima, knowing that New Left students would reject his request, nevertheless called out, "If only you would speak the emperor as 'Heavenly Emperor' (天皇, Tennō), I would gladly join hands with you"

Mishima, who had been learning Iaijutsu since 1965, arranged for seven or eight cadre Tatenokai members to also learn Iaijutsu in May, and provided Japanese swords to nine members, Hiroshi Mochimaru, Masakatsu Morita, Kiyoshi Kuramochi (倉持清), Shunsaku Fukuda (福田俊作), Toshio Fukuda (福田敏夫), Taketoshi Katsumata (勝又武校), Akihiro Hara (原昭弘), Masahiro Ogawa, and Masayoshi Koga, for form a "suicide squad" (決死隊, Kesshi-tai) capable of slashing. From May 23 to 26, special training was held for the 100 Tatenokai members under the direction of Colonel Yamamoto. Shortly before this, Mishima had met with Chief Cabinet Secretary Shigeru Hori together with Colonel Yamamoto, through the intermediation of Kinemaro Izawa (伊沢甲子麿).

In late June, Mishima, Colonel Yamamoto, and five of Yamamoto's subordinates dined together in a private room at the restaurant in the Hilltop Hotel (山の上ホテル). Mishima explained the Tatenokai's detailed plan for the defense of the Imperial Palace, and urged Colonel Yamamoto to make a decision, saying, "We have already formed a Kesshi-tai, I had provided Japanese swords to nine members." The five JSDF officers agreed with Mishima, but Colonel Yamamoto disagreed, saying, "We should first train in hand-to-hand combat (白兵戦, hakuhei-sen) to prepare for that day. And not to charge in ourselves, but to stop rioters from breaking in."

The JSDF officers pressed Colonel Yamamoto, shouting, "Coward! Are you going to betray us?" but Mishima stopped them. After a moment of silence, Mishima, with a look of suppressed righteous anger on his face, burned a piece of paper on an ashtray on which were written the three rules of the plan, including "Enter the Imperial Palace and defend it to the death." After Colonel Yamamoto finished explaining the tentative plan for the next training, Mishima proposed a plan to conduct the exercise at the Prime Minister's official residence, but Colonel Yamamoto, fearing the critical eyes of the JSDF in the media, immediately refused, saying, "That's no good." In July, Colonel Yamamoto was promoted to vice principal of the JGSDF Research School, and gradually he had less time to devote to guiding and supporting the Tatenokai.

Around this time in the early summer, a coup plan that had been hatched between Mishima and some senior officers (Lieutenant Generals) was buried in darkness. (Note: According to Azusa, it was "a certain general" who pulled the rug from under Mishima. According to Mochimaru, that person was Colonel Yamamoto. According to Colonel Yamamoto, that persons were Yamamoto himself, Lieutenant General H, and Iwaichi Fujiwara.) The senior officers had connections with the U.S.A.F. (includes U.S.F.J), and with the consent of the US army side, they were supposed to carry out security operations to turn the JSDF into a national army. However, Henry Kissinger secretly began preparations to visit China, and the US changed its stance to a pro-Chinese (親中, Sin-chū) attitude (changing relations between U.S. and China), and the situation became such that the formation of the JSDF into a National Army was not approved.

The fourth trial enlistment, leading by Mishima to the new students and members, took place at the Camp Takigahara of the JGSDF Fuji School from July 26 to August 23. During a regular family trip to Shimoda-shi, Izu Peninsula, (Note: Mishima made it a rule to take his family on a summer vacation every year to Shimoda-shi, Izu Peninsula, a place associated with his much respected Yoshida Shōin.) in which Mishima temporarily left the fourth trial enlistment, he sent a letter that asked Yasunari Kawabata to attend the Tatenokai's 1st anniversary parade to be held in November, writing an expression of his hopes for the following year, 1970. However, Kawabata did not reply to the letter.

Though it may seem funny to you that I am saying something foolish more and more, what I fear is not death, but the honor of my family after my death. If something were to happen to me, I feel that the public would immediately bare its fangs, expose my flaws, and destroy with dishonor. I don't mind people laughing at me while I'm alive, but I can't stand my children being laughed at by them after my death. I believe that Kawabata-san is the only one who can protect that, and I am relying on you wholeheartedly from now on.
On the other hand, it is also entirely possible that everything will be in vain, all the sweat and effort will disappear like bubbles, and everything will settle into a state of listless fatigue, and although common sense tells us that this is far more likely (perhaps 90 percent!), I just absolutely hate to bring myself to face that fact.

— Yukio Mishima, Letter to Yasunari Kawabata on August 4, 1969

Around this time, discord between Mishima and core veteran Tatenokai members, Kazuhiko Nakatsuji and Kiyoshi Bandai, began to surface. Contrary to Mishima's wishes, Nakatsuji, who had a loose sense of money and loose relationships with women, embezzled money and asked Seigen Tanaka (田中清玄) for funding for the financially struggling Controversy Journal, which became a decisive rift, and in late August, Nakatsuji, Bandai, and several others left the Tatenokai. Mishima covered all of the expenses for everyone in the Tatenokai, including travel, accommodation, food, miscellaneous expenses, and uniforms, so when Mishima heard that Seigen Tanaka had been boasting in business world (財界, zaikai) that "I am the patron of Mishima and the Tatenokai," this angered Mishima, who valued the honor of the Tatenokai.

On October 12, at the Tatenokai's October regular meeting, Hiroshi Mochimaru, the first student president, also formally resigned. Mochimaru, who was close to Nakatsuji, was unsure whether to side with Nakatsuji or Mishima, and decided to quit both his position as editor of the Controversy Journal and his activities with the Tatenokai. Mochimaru was engaged to Yoshiko Matsuura (松浦芳子), who helped with the Tatenokai's administrative work. Mishima repeatedly tried to persuade him to stay, saying, "If you devote yourself to your work with the Tatenokai, I will guarantee your livelihood after marriage," but Mochimaru ultimately declined. He had already secured employment as an executive at Teikoku Security Service (帝国警備保障).

According to Mishima's friend Takeshi Muramatsu (村松剛), Mishima, who never expected Mochimaru to quit, was devastated, like a father betrayed by his own child, and phone called Muramatsu in a complete despair, saying, "Mochimaru says he's quitting the Tatenokai. The Tatenokai will no longer come into existence..." Having lost his important right-hand man, Mochimaru, Mishima said to Colonel Yamamoto in an angry and sad voice, "A man really can change depending on a woman, can't he?"

Masakatsu Morita became the Tatenokai student leader in place of Mochimaru, and the Tatenokai office, which had been located within the editorial office of the Controversy Journal, was to be moved to the apartment in Juunisou where Morita lived. In contrast to Mochimaru, who was always the type to think intellectually and rationally and act cautiously, Morita, who lost his parents at a young age, was a selfless man of action who had no fear of death and was not concerned with theory, so, many Tatenokai members have believed that if Morita had not replaced Mochimaru as student dean at this time, the Mishima Incident would not have occurred. Morita's temperament clearly overlaps with that of the protagonist, Isao Iinuma (飯沼勲), who is headed straight for action as if he had stepped out of Mishima's novel Runaway Horses, and many researchers have mentioned that Mishima may have been dragged and influenced by Morita's pure temperament.

On October 21, International Anti-War Day, Mishima and the Tatenokai members checked the situation of the New Left Zengakuren demonstration, later named the "10.21 International Anti-War Day Struggle 1969" (10.21国際反戦デー闘争 1969年), just as they had done the previous year, hoping for the JSDF to be deployed for Public Order Deployment (治安出動, Chian shutsudō), but the New Left was easily suppressed by the Riot Police Unit. Mishima realized that there was no longer any room for the JSDF to be deployed for Public Order Deployment or for the Tatenokai's shock troops to be involved, and that there was no way to revise the constitution or turn the JSDF into a National Army through Public Order Deployment.

Mishima, who had believed that the government (Defense Agency) should take this opportunity to mobilize the JSDF's Public Order Deployment to clarify the difference between the police and the JSDF, felt great disappointment and indignation. Assuming the JSDF would begin to suppress the demonstrators and the Tatenokai would be able to joint and assist in, armed with Japanese swords too, Mishima had prepared himself for death in battle (斬死, kirijini) and expected that would leave the novel he was writing, The Temple of Dawn, unfinished. As he walked through the streets of Shinjuku, he repeatedly muttered to himself, "This is no good. This is no good at all," and shouted in despair, "It's no good if things continue like this!"

According to Atsuyuki Sassa, a police bureaucrat, who was a family friend of Mishima's, this inspection was arranged by Sassa, who had been instructed by his superiors to "ask the famous Mr. Mishima, to support the Riot Police Unit in the presence of the media", but when Mishima returned, he said, "We don't need to be here anymore. The Riot Police Unit were all smiling and showing their white teeth, calmly handling the New Left. Sasa, you took away our role, and I resent you." Sasa tried to persuade him, saying, "The guerrilla struggle is over. Why don't you return to the world of literature?", thereafter, no further communication between the two ceased.

On October 25, the 25th anniversary of the death of Zenmei Hasuda (age at death, 41), a Japanese literature scholar, was held at Momoyama (桃山), a Ryōtei in Ogikubo, Suginami-ku along the Chūō Main Line, for Hasuda. Hasuda had highly praised Mishima's The Forest in Full Bloom (花ざかりの森, Hanazakari no Mori), written when he was 16, saying "This youthful author is a heaven-sent child of eternal Japanese history", and he had told Mishima before leaving for the battlefield, "I have entrusted the future of Japan to you." He then committed suicide with a pistol just after the end of the war in Johor Bahru, where he was stationed. In his speech at the memorial ceremony, Mishima said, "My only emotional support is Mr. Hasuda, and now I have no hesitations and dithering over," and "I've now reached the age that Mr. Hasuda was at that time."

On October 31, at a meeting of the Tatenokai team leaders held at Mishima's residence, they discussed what to do next in the wake of the failure of the "10.21" plan. Morita, the leader of 1st team, suggested that the Tatenokai and the JSDF surround the National Diet Building and force them to propose constitutional amendment, but Mishima responded that this would be difficult to carry out due to issues with procuring weapons and the fact that the Diet was in session.

On November 3, at 3 pm, a parade was held on the rooftop of the National Theatre to celebrate the first anniversary of the founding of the Tatenokai, with former JGSDF Fuji School principal, former Lieutenant General Ikarii Junzō (碇井準三), as the person in reviewing stand, and actresses Eiko Muramatsu (村松英子) and Mitsuko Baisho presented bouquets to Mishima and others. The parade began with Masakatsu Morita leading the way, and Masahiro Ogawa carrying the unit flag, and the parade music was performed by the JGSDF Fuji School Band.

At the celebrate party held in the dining hall on the second floor of the theatre, former Lieutenant General Iwaichi Fujiwara and former Administrative Vice-Minister of Defense Yoshio Miwa gave congratulatory speeches, and Mishima also gave a speech.

Mishima had wanted Yasunari Kawabata to attend the ceremony too, and was extremely disappointed when Kawabata declined. Mishima had not received a reply to his letter inviting Kawabata to attend the parade, so in October he had visited Kawabata in person and had asked again to give a congratulatory speech at the parade, only to be coldly turned down. Disheartened, Mishima vented his anger and grief to his family and friends. Shintaro Ishihara was also invited by Mishima to the parade but was absent.

On November 16, the New Left launched a "struggle to prevent Prime Minister Satō from visiting the United States" (佐藤首相訪米阻止闘争), but the New Left was easily suppressed by the Riot Police Unit again, making the Public Order Deployment of the JSDF completely hopeless. On November 28, Mishima invited Colonel Yamamoto to his home to discuss the "Final Plan," but the meeting ended without any concrete measures being forthcoming from Colonel Yamamoto. From December 8, Mishima went to South Korea for four days to inspect the military situation against North Korean armed guerrillas.

On December 22, Mishima and Tatenokai held a regular meeting at the JGSDF Camp Narashino (習志野駐屯地) in Chiba Prefecture, after which they conducted preliminary parachute training with the 1st Airborne Brigade. After the training, Mishima stressed the urgency of constitutional amendment. Based on this, it was decided to organize the 10th team "Constitutional Amendment Draft Study Group" (憲法改正草案研究会) within 13 members of Tatenokai, with Tsutomu Abe (阿部勉), a 1st generation member and the leader of 5th team, as group leader, and to hold a three-hour discussion meeting among members every Wednesday night.

On December 1, Mishima, in a dialogue with Ichirō Murakami (村上一郎) that was to be published the following New Year, said that the current JSDF did not have the system in place to bring about a revolution like the February 26 incident, and that only an officer of the rank of Colonel or higher could make anything happen. In this dialogue, Mishima talked on the weight of political words, saying, "If I says, 'I'm going to die in November,' then I must die."

In a dialogue with Fusao Hayashi around the same time, he spoke about the significance of "Nationalism" in protecting Japan from Totalitarianism arising from "foreign ideology" that could uproot Japanese culture and destroy the Japanese language.

As a matter of fact, I don't like Anti-communism. Nationalism is about being against all foreign ideologies, whether they are Communism or whatever, and it doesn't mean to be against just because they are the Communist Party. Anything that tarnishes the purity of Japan is no good, whether it's Communism, Capitalism, or Democracy. So, we just need to be Japanese. To that end, I don't care if people call me right-winger or whatever.

— Yukio Mishima, Right-wing and left-wing in modern times: There is no sincerity in the remote control left wing

=== 1970 (Shōwa 45) ===
In the New Year of 1970, at a New Year's party held at Mishima's residence, where Colonel Kiyokatsu Yamamoto (山本舜勝) and members of the Tatenokai had gathered, the topic of civil defense organization came up, and Mishima casually remarked, "It is possible that they might turn their blades against the JSDF."

At the end of January, Mishima invited Lee (李), former Major General of South Korea Armed Forces, who had looked after him during his visit to South Korea in December of the previous year, and Colonel Yamamoto for dinner. After Lee left, Mishima asked Colonel Yamamoto, "Aren't you going to carry out a coup!" to which Colonel Yamamoto replied, "If you do, please slash to kill me first." Around this time, Mishima had been in contact with a JSDF officer whom Colonel Yamamoto considered to be "a man of backbone." (Note: Around this time, a high school boy visited Mishima's residence. Mishima, who was about to go out, since there was not much time, he said the boy to ask the one question he most wanted to ask. The boy stared directly up into the eyes of Mishima with clear eyes and asked, "When are you going to die, Sensei?" Mishima gave a comical and confused response at the time, but even after the boy left, the boy's words deep remained in Mishima's heart.)

The fifth trial enlistment, leading by Mishima to the new students and members, took place at the Camp Takigahara of the JGSDF Fuji School from March 1 to 28. Around this time, Masakatsu Morita, the student leader and the leader of 1st team, and Mishima began discussing plans for an uprising, but no concrete plan put in place yet. At the end of March, Mishima suddenly visited Colonel Yamamoto's house, dressed in a kimono and carrying a Japanese sword in a brocade silk bag. Colonel Yamamoto tried not to mention the Japanese sword, but it seemed that Mishima was offering it to Colonel Yamamoto to encourage his resolve. With the help of Mrs. Yamamoto's mediation, the uneasy atmosphere between two, was eased and passed without showdown. As he was leaving, Mishima said, "Colonel Yamamoto, you are a cold person," to which Colonel Yamamoto replied, "If you're going to slash me, I want you to do it while I am still in uniform."

Around the March, in his essay What is the existence of Novels (小説とは何か, Shōsetsu towa nanika), Mishima wrote about the discomfort he felt when his dreams of "Reality outside the work" were shattered, along with that, he completed The Temple of Dawn, the third novel in The Sea of Fertility tetralogy, and how he would not want to think about what to do after finishing the remaining fourth novel. And he talked about the life of authors, touching on the words of Yoshida Shōin while in prison, who sent to his disciple Takasugi Shinsaku, "There are those who bodies are perished but whose souls remain. If the heart is dead, there is no benefit to living, but if the soul remains, there is no loss in perishing."

According to his theory, there are two kinds of people in this world. Those whose souls are dead and whose bodies are alive, and those whose bodies are dead but whose souls are alive. It is very difficult for both the soul and the body to be alive. What living authors should be like this, but there are not many authors whose souls and bodies are alive together. The problem with authors is that even if their bodies die, their works remain. How eerie that only their works remain, without their souls remaining? Also, if the soul is dead but the body is alive, how monstrously ugly that one must live together with the works from when the soul was still alive. The life of an author, whatever else he alive or dead, cannot be compared to the life of a transparent person of action like Yoshida Shōin. If it is the destiny of an author to fully experience the death of his soul and this process of that death while he is still alive, then there could be no more cursed life.

— Yukio Mishima, What is the Existence of Novels – No.11

On April 3, Mishima asked Masayoshi Koga (小賀正義) (nickname: Chibi-Koga), the leader of 5th team, at the coffee shop in the Imperial Hotel at 1-1 Uchisaiwaichō, Chiyoda-ku, if he would be willing to join them in the uprising until the very end, and Chibi-Koga agreed. On April 10, Mishima invited Masahiro Ogawa (小川正洋), the leader of 7th team, to his home and asked him if he would also be willing to participate in the "final action," and after much deliberation, Ogawa also agreed, just like Chibi-Koga.

In late April, Mishima visited Colonel Yamamoto's house with a biography published in March, Hasuda Zenmei and His Death by poet Jirō Odakane (小高根二郎), which he had been reading every issue of a magazine since 1959, 11 years earlier, and dedicated it to him, saying, "My nowaday was determined by this book."

In May, Mishima distributed the first issue of Problem presentation (問題提起, Mondai teiki) for the "Constitutional Amendment Draft Study Group," entitled "The Absence of 'Japan' in the postwar new Constitution," to the members of Tatenokai. (Note: The second of Problem presentation distributed in July 1970 was "Abandonment of War," followed by the third in September, "Regarding the 'Emergency Law'".) In his Problem presentation, Mishima argued that in addition to revising or abolishing Article 9 of the Constitution, the misguided and danger of the existing provision in Chapter 1 that states that Emperor's status is "based on the general will of the people" must be corrected, and that Article 20, regarding "Freedom of religion," must be rectified because it was defined by Christian Westerners, without the understanding of the syncretism nature of Japanese State Shintoism. (Note: In there, Mishima criticized the Constitution drawn up by GHQ, saying that it was clear that GHQ did not understand the traditional Japanese idea of the Emperor, whose functions as a guarantor of the temporal continuity of a supra-personal, traditional, and historical entity, and instead forcibly attached it to Western democratic ideals, thereby judging and confusing Japan's gods, meddling in the religious issues of a defeated country, with the aim of eventually eradicating Japan's cultural traditions.)

In mid-May, Masakatsu Morita, Masayoshi Koga, and Masahiro Ogawa gathered at Mishima's house. They discussed the "best way" for the Tatenokai and the JSDF to launch an armed uprising together, enter the National Diet, and appeal for constitutional amendment, but the specific method was still being explored. From June 2 to 4, Mishima and the Tatenokai held a refresher course for advanced members at the Camp Takigahara of the JGSDF Fuji School. This was a grueling training session in which they marched through the Aokigahara Sea of Trees without food and without sleep or rest.

On June 13, Mishima, Morita, Chibi-Koga, and Ogawa gathered at room 821 of the Hotel Okura, 3 Akasaka-Aoi-cho, Minato-ku (now 2-10-4 Toranomon, Minato-ku). Realizing that they could no longer rely on the JSDF officers they had been in contact with, they came up with a concrete plan to carry it out on their own.

Mishima proposed a plan to occupy a JSDF's arms and ammunition depot to secure weapons and threaten to blow it up, or to restrain the Commander-in-Chief of the Eastern Army Headquarters and rally the JSDF personnel together to occupy the National Diet and force a vote on constitutional amendment. After discussion, it was decided to take the approach of restraining the Commander-in-Chief of the Eastern Army, and ideas such as inviting him to the Tatenokai's second anniversary parade and restraining him there, were considered.

On June 21, Mishima, Morita, Chibi-Koga, and Ogawa gathered at Room 206 of the Hilltop Hotel, 1-1 Surugadai, Chiyoda-ku. Mishima reported that he had successfully obtained permission to rent the heliport at the Camp Ichigaya (市ヶ谷駐屯地) for the Tatenokai's physical training. He then suggested that the person to be restrained be changed to Colonel Tomoyuki Miyata (宮田朋幸), commander of the 32nd Infantry Regiment (第32普通科連隊), because the Eastern Army Commandant General's office was far from the heliport, and everyone agreed.

In the same June, Mishima asked his lawyer Saitō to draw up a will, with the pretext that he might get into a traffic accident, in which he stipulated that the copyrights of Confessions of a Mask and Thirst for Love would be transferred to his mother after his death. Mishima also had his final dinners with the writers he was close to and respected, Jun Ishikawa, Kōbō Abe, and Taijun Takeda. On the other hand, Mishima distanced himself from Shintaro Ishihara, with whom he had been close, and publicly criticized Ishihara's behavior of the frivolous internal criticism which was only for the media without bolting the Liberal Democratic Party.

On July 5, Mishima, Morita, Chibi-Koga, and Ogawa gathered in Room 207 of the Hilltop Hotel. They decided to carry out the plan on the day of the Tatenokai regular meeting in November, and during training at the heliport after the meeting, Mishima would load their weapons, the Japanese swords, into Koga's car and go to the 32nd Infantry Regiment Commander's room, where they would restrain Commander Miyata. In the same month, Mishima entrusted Chief Cabinet Secretary Shigeru Hori who had asked Mishima for his opinion on defense, and Minister of Defense Yasuhiro Nakasone with a document on defense as a Petition (建白書, kenpaku-sho) to the government, and Prime Minister Eisaku Satō read it too, was supposed to submit it to the Cabinet meeting, but Nakasone stopped it, was not submit to meeting. (Note: Mishima's Petition was published in August 1978, after his death, under the titles Bushidō and Militarism (武士道と軍国主義, Bushidō to Gunkoku-shugi), Regular and Irregular Armies (正規軍と不正規軍, Seiki-gun to Fu-seiki-gun).)

Mishima contributed an essay titled The Promise left unfulfilled: 25 years within me (果たし得てゐない約束―私の中の二十五年, Hatashi ete inai Yakusoku: Watashi no naka no 25 nen) to the July 7, 1970, the Sankei Shimbun evening paper for a special feature marking the 25th anniversary of the end of the war, in which he looked back on the "emptiness" he felt in the 25 years since the end of the war, saying that he "passed through that time holding my nose," and described that years as follows:

What I hated 25 years ago has changed in some form, but it has still staying alive tenaciously today. Not only has it stayed alive, but it has completely infiltrated Japan with astonishing fecundity. It is the postwar democracy (戦後民主主義) and formidable bacillus of hypocrisy that has arisen from postwar democracy. I was quite naive to think that such hypocrisy and deception would end with the American occupation. What is astonishing is that the Japanese people have willingly chosen to make it part of their own constitutional predisposition. In politics, the economy, society, and even culture. (Omitted)
In the 25 years, I have lost my hopes one by one, and now, as I see the end in sight, I am stunned at how empty and vulgar all those hopes were, and how enormous the energy they required. (Omitted)
I don't have much hope for the future of Japan. I feel more and more each day that if things continue as they are, "Japan" will vanish away. Japan will be gone, and in its place, an inorganic, empty, neutral, intermediate colored, wealthy, and shrewd economic superpower will remain in a corner of the Far East. I no longer feel like talking to people who think that's okay.

— Yukio Mishima, Promise that I haven't been Fulfilled: 25 years in me

On July 11, Chibi-Koga used the 200,000 yen cash given to him by Mishima to purchase a used 1966 white Toyota Corona from Kugamoto Motors. In late July, Mishima and three others met at the pool of the Hotel New Otani at 4 Kioichō, Chiyoda-ku, to discuss whether they should add another member to the Tatenokai. That summer, Mishima gave each of the three 80,000 yen and sent them on a recreational trip to Hokkaido.

Then around this time, Morita, who had returned to his hometown of Yokkaichi-shi, Mie Prefecture, told his childhood friend Shigeru Ueda (上田茂), who was like a younger brother, "After I met Yukio Mishima, I was able to theorize my own way of thinking. Therefore, I cannot let Mishima die alone." Morita had dinner with Shigeru's family at his house, as he had done in the boyhood, and had also last conversation with Shigeru's older sister, Makiko (牧子), who was his first love. (Note: While Morita was still in his hometown, he had wanted to marry Makiko, but her mother had turned him down, politely saying, "Thank you for being a friend to my daughter.")

On a day early August, while staying at a hotel in Shimoda-shi, Izu Peninsula, on his annual family vacation, Mishima wrote "Death of Remonstration" (諌死, Kanshi) on a piece of notebook paper and handed it to Henry Scott-Stokes, who was invited to Mishima. On August 28, Mishima, Morita, Chibi-Koga, and Ogawa gathered again at the pool of the Hotel New Otani and decided to add Hiroyasu Koga, the vice leader of 5th team, to their group.

On September 1, on the way home from the "Constitutional Amendment Draft Study Group," Morita and Chibi-Koga invited Hiroyasu Koga (nickname: Furu-Koga) to a late-night bar called "Parkside" at 3-8-1 Nishi-Shinjuku, Shinjuku-ku, where they explained their "final plan" and gained Furu-Koga's approval. Morita and Chibi-Koga asked Furu-Koga, "Can you share life and death with Mishima Sensei?" and, "Hiro-chan, can you give us your life?" Furu-Koga, who had been prepared for this since he joined the Tatenokai, immediately accepted and expressed his gratitude for being accepted as a comrade.

On September 3, Mishima was invited to the Youth Political Training Workshop of the New Political Comrades Association (新政同志会), presided by Yasuhiro Nakasone, where he gave a lecture on Japan's self-defense. Mishima spoke of the importance of Japan having lived its long history in a uniquely Japanese way of traditional culture, and he said that Japan would not be able to win against the ideological strategies of other countries if it ignored its traditions and national spirit. He also warned that if the Japanese were to become overconfident and let their guard down, thinking "We Japanese will be fine, even if leave things lay, we Japanese will be able to tap our potential and do our best when the crunch comes," they would end up putting on belly fat and becoming like pigs.

Although I consider myself a human being today, I have always lived in fear that tomorrow I might become a pig. In order to avoid becoming a pig and to avoid accumulating fat, we must constantly sharpen our minds, just like polishing a Japanese sword every day. If we don't, humans will become useless. I think Japanese people don't realize that they are becoming more and more corrupt day by day. When I think like this, I gradually come to understand the current world situation, or the difficulties that Japan faces as a country in terms of its international strategy.

— Yukio Mishima, About Self-defense of Our country

On the same day, September 3, Mishima was invited to dinner at the home of Henry Scott-Stokes. After the meal, Mishima looked gloomy and said that Japan had lost its spiritual values, and materialism infested instead, he then told a strange analogy: "Japan is under the curse of a Green Snake. There is a Green Snake in the bosom of Japan." "There is no way to escape this curse." Scott-Stokes continued to wonder what the "Green Snake" meant, and around 1990, 20 years after the Mishima incident, he suddenly told Takao Tokuoka (徳岡孝夫) that he had realized it referred to "US dollars" (green paper money). (Note: Mishima would sometimes suddenly utter prophetic statements, and around spring in 1970, he had spoken to his father Azusa in the living room, expressing his concern for Japan's future. A Mishima's senior colleague also heard the exact same prophecy from Mishima while dining with him a restaurant in Ginza in the spring of 1968. One evening, around the spring of the year the incident occurred, my son said in the living room, "Japan will be in a strange position. One day, the United States suddenly contacts China over Japan's head, Japan will only be able to look up from the bottom of the valley and eavesdrop on the conversation slightly. Our friend Taiwan will say that "it will no longer be able to count on Japan", and Taiwan will go somewhere. Japan may become an orphan in the Orient, and may eventually fall into the merchandises of human trafficking. Today, there is no one other than teenagers to whom we can entrust the future of Japan." — Azusa Hiraoka, My son: Yukio Mishima)

During same time, Mishima frequently met with his friends Donald Richie and Meredith Weatherby, the translator of The Sound of Waves. When Richie mocked the Tatenokai members as Boy Scouts, Mishima responded, "The few Boy Scouts of them and I will become the core that maintains order." He also respected Saigō Takamori, who fought against the new Meiji government that had succumbed to bureaucracy and who rose up with young soldiers even though he knew he would defeat, calling him "the last true samurai."

On September 9, Mishima invited Furu-Koga to a French restaurant in Ginza 4-chōme, where he explained the details of his plan and told him that the plan would be carried out on November 25. Mishima said, "It will be impossible to find anyone in the JSDF who will join us. Either way, I must die," and "Now that I've come this far, I'm on the 3rd street of Hell (point of no return) (地獄の3丁目, Jigoku no 3-chōme)".

From September 10 to 12, Mishima and the Tatenokai practiced a refresher course for advanced members at the Camp Takigahara of the JGSDF Fuji School. On September 15, Mishima, Morita, Chibi-Koga, Ogawa, and Furu-Koga watched a Togakure-ryū Ninja arts (忍法, Ninpō) Demonstration (Ninja Tournament) held at Kofu-kaikan (興風会館) in Noda-shi, Chiba Prefecture, and on the way back, they dined at the wild boar restaurant "Momonji-ya" (ももんじ屋) at 1-10-2 Ryōgoku, Sumida-ku, to strengthen their bond as comrades.

Around this time, Mishima wrote about his complicated feelings, along with words of gratitude in the organizational newspaper (機関誌, kikanshi) of the Camp Takigahara of the JGSDF Fuji School, where he had been looked after for nearly four years.

Here, I was warmly welcomed from beginning to end, treated with true humanity and trust without any vested interests, and experienced the tears of a man that I would never experience in the outside world. For me, this was Japan. Everything that Japan in the outside world had been lost was here. The harshness and the beauty of the Japanese man's world were alive only here. We spoke of Japan's fate and lamented its fate as if we were concerned directly about the fate of our own families. (Omitted)
This was my place of training and also my place of contemplation. Here, I was taught the dignity and harshness of self-renunciation, the unity of thought and action, and the strict true path of integrating mind and body. (Omitted)
To all the people at the Camp Takigahara, including the successive regimental commanders, I have nothing but gratitude. At the same time, I also have pity for my own almost fanatical feelings, worrying about its fate around the clock, thinking only about its future, and devoting my mind only to finding a solution, having become a man who "knows too much" about the JSDF.

— Yukio Mishima, Camp Takigahara is My Second Home

On September 25, Mishima, Morita, Chibi-Koga, Ogawa, and Furu-Koga gathered at the Isetan Kaikan Kōraku-en Sauna (伊勢丹会館後楽園サウナ) at 17 Shinjuku 3-chōme. Mishima proposed to change the method of convening the Tatenokai regular meetings, and decided that for the November meeting in particular, Mishima would directly contact the members he chose, excluding those whose family or relatives in the JSDF, and also excluding those who had plans to get a job or get married. In early October, Furu-Koga said he wanted to see the mountains and rivers of his hometown, Hokkaido, before he died, so Mishima gave him 10,000 yen, half of his travel expenses.

Around September or October, Morita's roommates Takashi Noda (野田隆史) and Kenji Kurata (倉田賢司) who were the 4th generation Tatenokai members, heard Morita say at their boarding house, "If Mishima has come this far and still hasn't done anything, I'll kill him." And, according to the testimony of the Mama-san of a bar called "P" in Yotsuya 3-chome, which Morita and his friends often frequented, Morita had once said, in a state of brood on, "I'm going to kill Prime Minister Satō in December."

On October 2, Mishima and four others gathered at the Chinese restaurant "Daiichi-rou" (第一楼) at 6-9 Ginza 2-chōme. They decided on the specific procedure, to hold the November Tatenokai regular meeting at 11:00 am, to begin regular training at the heliport at the Camp Ichigaya after the meeting, and then for Mishima and Chibi-Koga to leave on the pretext of attending a funeral, to carry the Japanese swords into their car, and then to restrain the commander of the 32nd Infantry Regiment.

It was also decided that two reliable journalists who could report the whole story, would be waiting at the Palace Hotel, and would ride in the car with Mishima and Chibi-Koga and wait in front of the 32nd Infantry Regiment building. On October 9, the four of them, excluding Furu-Koga who was going home in Hokkaido, gathered again at the "Daiichi-rou" and reconfirmed the plan.

On October 17, Mishima called Hiroshi Mochimaru to his residence and asked him to bring the blood oath that had been drawn up on February 25, 1968, and told him that he wanted to burn it because many of the signers (mainly the Controversy Journal group) had left the Tatenokai. On October 19, after the October regular meeting, Mishima, Morita, Chibi-Koga, Ogawa, and Furu-Koga posed for a commemorative photo wearing the Tatenokai uniform at the Tojo Kaikan (東條會館), 4 Kōjimachi 1-chōme, Chiyoda-ku.

On October 23, the all Tatenokai members conducted drills at crematoriums and power supply control centers in Tokyo. Before the drill, Mishima silently wrote "coup d'État" in English on the blackboard in front of the members who had gathered at the Arcadia Ichigaya Shigaku Kaikan, and showed specific locations where the city's functions would be paralyzed. The members thought that the Tatenokai coup would finally begin. After the drill, Mishima visited Colonel Yamamoto's house alone at night. Colonel Yamamoto recalled that the visit that day was like the "Farewell of Genzō Akahani with Sake bottle" (赤埴源蔵徳利の別れ, Akahani Genzō tokkuri no wakare), who was one of Forty-seven rōnin.

On October 27, Mishima and Mochimaru burned the blood oath in the gardens of the Mishima's troupe Roman Theatre (浪曼劇場, Rōman Gekijō). However, before handing it over to Mishima, Mochimaru secretly kept a copy of it. After the burning, while drinking coffee at "Almond" (アマンド) in Roppongi, Minato-ku, Mishima said to Mochimaru, "The nature of the Tatenokai changed after you buddy left. From next year, I would like to change the form of the group. You know the group very well, so I would like you to support us from the outside." About a week before, Mochimaru had received a call from Morita, who invited him to a sushi restaurant in Takadanobaba and treated him to sushi.

On November 3, Mishima, Morita, Chibi-Koga, Ogawa, and Furu-Koga met at "Almond" and then went to the sauna "Misty" at 5-3 Roppongi 4-chōme, to discuss the draft of the Geki and the items in the Demands. At this time, Mishima stopped the plan for everyone to commit suicide, ordering Chibi-Koga, Ogawa, and Furu-Koga, "Dying is easy, living is hard. You must bear this."

Mishima said, "You buddies have all come with the determination to die, and I am glad about that. However, someone must stay alive to protect the commander and escort him away so that he does not commit suicide. I have entrusted this task to Chibi-Koga, Furu-Koga, and Ogawa. Morita, I leave you to do kaishaku. Please do as fleetly as possible, don't leave me in agony too long." The three, who had already prepared for death, were shocked by the order to live.

Morita told Chibi-Koga, Furu-Koga, and Ogawa, "We are all the same whether we live or die, because we will meet again somewhere," and "Because we are as one flesh, our souls will become one in the great beyond." On the previous day, November 2, Mishima had called Morita to "Hamasaku" (浜作) in Ginza and persuaded him not to commit suicide, saying, "Morita, you buddy must live. I hear you have a girlfriend, don't you?" Morita had a girlfriend with whom he had considered marriage, named Yumiko Shibata (柴田由美子). (Note: Yumiko Shibata had been working for a phone secretary service company located inside Seibu Department Stores in Shibuya-ku, that was outsourced to handle telephone secretarial services by Tatenokai, in which their contact between members or external administrative communications. Morita and Yumiko began dating at the end of January 1970 after exchanging messages every day. However, on October 31 of the same year, about one month before the incident, Morita broke up with Yumiko, saying, "I think there is someone better suited for you than me. I hope you find him and be happy." Morita's friends of the "Junisō Group" also knew about their relationship. After the incident, Yumiko was questioned by the police, and visited Morita's brother in Yokkaichi-shi, Mie Prefecture to visit Morita's grave. She later married in 1976 and had a daughter and a son, then, Yumiko"s first grandchild was named "Masakatsu.")

However, Morita insisted, "I cannot be the only one to survive when Mishima Sensei, who I consider to be a father, dies. Please let me accompany you on your journey to death." Afterwards, Chibi-Koga, Ogawa, and Furu-Koga also tried to persuade Morita, saying, "You buddy too should live together us, and carry on the spirit of the Sensei," and Mishima hoped that Morita would reconsider his decision to commit suicide, but Morita's determination was unwavering.

From November 4 to 6, Mishima and the Tatenokai practiced a refresher course for advanced members at the Camp Takigahara of the JGSDF Fuji School. Members received training in railway demolition and learned how to set bombs. They also observed the actual demolition of railroad tracks, which were blown up with a bang and blown to pieces. During this final trial enlistment, Mishima had sent Yasunari Kawabata a final letter written in pencil, but Kawabata incinerated it. According to Kawabata's son-in-law, Kaori Kawabata (川端香男里), the reason of his incineration was, "The sentences were messed up, and if I kept it, it would be a dishonor to Mishima, so I incinerated it immediately." Some researchers have speculated that the letter was incinerated because it contained things that would be a dishonor to Kawabata himself. (Note: A few days before Yasunari Kawabata committed suicide on April 16, 1972, Mishima's father Azusa, received a long letter from Kawabata. Azusa had not been fond of Kawabata since Kawabata refused to attend the Tatenokai 1st anniversary parade, and he sarcastically remarked, "I was intrigued by the letter, as it really revealed some completely unexpected aspects of Kawabata's personality," and said he would keep it as a family heirloom. (As of 2025, the Kawabata's last letter has still not been made public.))

After the training, Mishima Morita, Chibi-Koga, Ogawa, and Furu-Koga secretly regretted at parting from the other members and JSDF personnel at a convivial party held at the Gotemba Hall Annex (御殿場館別館) in Gotemba-shi. Mishima sat seiza-style and poured sake for everyone, singing Ken Takakura's yakuza movie hit theme song Karajishi and Peonies (唐獅子牡丹, Karajishi botan). Morita sang an elementary school song Flowers (花, Hana) and a military song Katō Hayabusa Fighter Squadron (加藤隼戦闘隊, Katō Hayabusa Sentō-tai), Chibi-Koga sang a kayōkyoku When the White Flowers Bloom (白い花の咲く頃, Shiroi hana no saku koro), Ogawa sang a prewar song Song of the Shōwa Restoration (昭和維新の歌, Shōwa Isin no uta) and a kayōkyoku Shiretoko Love Song, and Furu-Koga recited a poem by a kamikaze pilot.

On November 10, Morita, Chibi-Koga, Ogawa, and Furu-Koga entered the Camp Ichigaya under the pretext of meeting with Captain Katsuo Kikuchi, and inspected the area in front of the 32nd Infantry Regiment building to confirm where to park. On November 12, Morita, Ogawa, and Chibi-Koga looked on the "Yukio Mishima Exhibition" held at Tobu Department Store (東武百貨店). That night, at the late-night bar "Parkside," Morita asked Ogawa to perform the kaishaku, and Ogawa agreed.

On November 14, Mishima, and four others gathered at the sauna "Misty." They decided that let two reporters, NHK reporter Munekatsu Date (伊達宗克) and Weekly magazine Sunday Mainichi (サンデー毎日) reporter Takao Tokuoka (徳岡孝夫), would be waiting in front of the 32nd Infantry Regiment building. Mishima explained that they would hand over the Geki and commemorative photographs of themselves to the two reporters on the day of the uprising, and Mishima and four others discussed the draft of the Geki.

On November 17, Mishima wrote a letter to Fumio Shimizu (清水文雄), his former teacher of his days at Gakushūin, "The Sea of Fertility is coming to an end, but I have made it a taboo to say, 'When it's over...' to my family and publishers alike. For me, to end of this novel is nothing less than the end of the world. I previously wrote about the great temple of Bayon in Cambodia in a play called The Terrace of the Leper King, and for me this novel was Bayon." He also wrote as follows: (Note: In The Terrace of the Leper King there is an indicative passage: "I'm dying. I have known for some time that the day of the completion of Bayon would be the day of my death.")

Whenever I meet foreigners these days, they immediately ask me with a worried look on their face, "What is going to happen to Japan? Is Japan going to disappear?" I have never been asked the same question by Japanese persons. "Isn't this good? Isn't it fine? Don't make things rocking the boat, so-so." That's what clever adults do, and all of Japan has become just clever adults.

— Yukio Mishima, Letter to Fumio Shimizu on November 17, 1945

On November 18, in a dialogue with Takashi Furubayashi (古林尚), a literary critic, and one of Mishima's opponents, Mishima talked, "I don't want to receive a single mon of money from the Liberal Democratic Party," and said of what he is trying to do, "It's the way of life of Yoshida Shōin. There is nothing else to do other than to manifest the justice." Furthermore, he said, "I am not going to easily fall into the hands of my enemy. My enemies are the government, the Liberal Democratic Party, and the entire postwar system. This includes the Socialist Party and the Communist Party. To me, the Communist Party and the Liberal Democratic Party are the same thing. They are exactly the same. Because both are symbols of hypocrisy."

On November 19, Mishima, and four others gathered at the Isetan Kaikan Kōraku-en Sauna Rest Room. They discussed how long it would take for the JSDF personnel to assemble after the 32nd Infantry Regiment Commander Miyata had restrained, and how much time Mishima would give for his speech. When Morita asked, "If our demands are not met, can I kill the Regiment Commander?", Mishima replied, "The Regiment Commander must be returned unharmed." Later, at the late-night bar "Parkside," Morita told Furu-Koga, "It's the greatest friendship when you kaishaku me."

On November 21, Morita went to Camp Ichigaya under the pretext of delivering Mishima's book Introductions to the Philosophy of Action (行動学入門, Kōdōgaku Nyūmon) to check whether the 32nd Infantry Regiment Commander Miyata would be in his office on November 25, the day of the uprising, but ascertained that he would not be there on the 25. Morita, and four others immediately gathered at the Chinese restaurant "Daiichi-rou." After receiving Morita's report, they discussed the matter and decided to change the person they were restraining to the Eastern Army Headquarters Commander-in-Chief, Lieutenant General Kanetoshi Mashita (益田兼利). Mishima immediately called General Mashita and arranged to meet him at 11:00 am on November 25.

On the same day and the following day, November 22, Morita, Chibi-Koga, Ogawa, and Furu-Koga received 4,000 yen from Mishima, and went to Shinjuku Station Building (新宿ステーション・ビル) and other places to purchase ropes, wire for building barricades, pliers, calico cloth for banners, brandy for restorative, water bottles, etc. On the 22 night after making their purchases, while driving around Yokohama with Morita, Chibi-Koga was asked by Morita, "If I am unable to do it, will you kaishaku Mishima Sensei," to which Chibi-Koga agreed.

On November 23, Mishima, and four others gathered in Room 519 of the Palace Hotel in Marunouchi. They made the final preparations for the uprising (writing banners, Geki, hachimaki headbands, death poems, etc.) and conducted a dry run of the series of actions. Morita saw some absorbent cotton among those items, he asked, "What is this for?" Mishima replied, "It's for stuffed into the anus." It was prepared to prevent them from passing stool when they commits seppuku. When each person was writing their death poems, Mishima said, "It doesn't have to be well, just write freely." They gathered again at the Palace Hotel on the following day, November 24, for another dry run, and practiced about eight times in total, including the day before.

At around 2:00 pm on the same day, November 24, Mishima phone called Takao Tokuoka and Munekatsu Date, and said, "Please bring the reporter's armband and camera (to a specified location) at 11:00 am tomorrow, and please don't tell anyone about this, I will contact you again at 10:00 am tomorrow," and received their approval. At around 3:00 pm, he phone called Kikue Kojima (小島喜久江), his editor in charge of Shinchosha, to come to his home to pick up the manuscript of The Decay of the Angel, the fourth novel in The Sea of Fertility tetralogy.

On the evening of the same day, November 24, from around 4 pm, Mishima, and four others had the final dinner in an inner room (number 5, 8 tatami mats) of the Ryōtei "Suegen" (末げん) at 15-7 Shinbashi 2-chōme, where they ordered the "Wa" (「わ」) course of chicken hotpot (15,000 yen per person) and seven bottles of beer. At around 6 pm, when the room waitress Yuriko Akama (赤間百合子) (aged 40) tried to pour a drink, Mishima poured himself a beer and made a final toast (乾杯, Kanpai).

During the dinner, they did not talk about the next day's uprising, but chatted about movie actresses and Shintaro Katsu, an actor with whom Mishima co-starred in the film Hitokiri. Mishima said, "I thought we would get more sentimental when we hold that it was finally tomorrow, but it's nothing. In the end, I think it would be the third parties who see us, get sentimental."

After the dinner, at around 8 pm, they all left the Ryōtei and headed home in Chibi-Koga's car. In the car, Mishima said, "I feel sorry for the Commander-in-Chief, General Mashita because he is a fine man, but if I kill myself in front of him, he will probably understand." He also said that after his speech on the balcony, if they were caught by the JSDF officers before his entering the General's room, all five of them would have nothing left except to bite their tongues and die. Mishima then handed Furu-Koga a green pocketbook in which he had written down the details of their action plans, and asked him to burn it.

Returning to his home at 32-8 Minami Magome 4-chōme, Ōta-ku, Mishima went to the house where his parents live on the same property at around 10 pm to say goodnight to them, and his father Azusa warned his son about smoking too much. After returning to his boarding at Room 8 of Kobayashi-sō apartment at 32-12 Nishi-Shinjuku 4-chōme, Morita invited Kenichi Tanaka, a 3rd generation Tatenokai member who lived with him, to go to the nearby small restaurant "Saegusa" (三枝) and entrusted Tanaka with two envelopes to be handed over to Takao Tokuoka and Munekatsu Date at the Ichigaya Hall, where the Tatenokai's regular meeting was to be held the next day. Morita then phone called a girl working the cash register at a late-night bar in Shinjuku, and walked with her down the street late at night, before returning to his boarding house.

After driving Mishima and Morita to their respective homes, Chibi-Koga returned to his boarding house Taisōkan (大早館) at 498 Totsuka (戸塚) 1-chome, Shinjuku-ku, together with Ogawa and Furu-Koga, and the two stayed at the Chibi-Koga's boarding. That night, the three discussed the matter of kaishaku, and Ogawa asked Chibi-Koga, who had extensive experience in kendo, to take Morita's kaishakunin if he was unable to do, and Chibi-Koga agreed. However, the three also decided that if the person who was supposed to carry out the kaishaku could not, someone else would carry it out, regardless of whether it was Mishima's or Morita's kaishaku. On this day, Ogawa registered his marriage with Keiko (圭映子), the girl he was living with, and informed the two of them of the news. (Note: Keiko (圭映子) was pregnant at the time. After the incident, Keiko talked that she had been informed of the uprising plan by Ogawa in advance. Later, Keiko gave birth to a boy who was named Kiichirō (紀一郎) after Mishima's two children's names, Noriko (紀子) and Iichirō (威一郎).)

On November 25, Chibi-Koga, Ogawa, and Furu-Koga woke up at 7:00 am. Furu-Koga had been asked by Morita to wake him up, so he called the Semi-Public Pink Telephone (ピンク電話, pink denwa) in the hallway of Morita's boarding house. The three of them skipped breakfast, put on coats and cardigans over their uniforms so as not to draw attention, put their caps in plastic shopping bags, and left the boarding house at around 8:50 am in a Toyota Corona driven by Chibi-Koga.

Morita woke up at 7 am, and put on a white cotton fundoshi, a loincloth. Tanaka didn't ask him why, but helped him tie the knot of fundoshi adjust tighter. Then, Morita met up with Chibi-Koga, Ogawa, and Furu-Koga, who arrived in a Toyota Corona, at the entrance to the Nishiguchi ramp (西口ランプ) near Shinjuku Central Park at around 9 am. They headed for the Mishima residence, exited the Ebara ramp (荏原ランプ), and stopped at a gas station, where they had turned onto the Dai-ni Keihin Avenue (第二京浜国道) near the Mishima residence, to have their car washed. In the interval, each person posted a farewell letter to their family back home.

Mishima woke up at 8:00 am, put on a white cotton fundoshi, then after dressed his Tatenokai uniform, he drank only a glass of water, and left the manuscript of The Decay of the Angel, which he would give to Kikue Kojima, with his maid. Around 10:00 am, Mishima phone called Takao Tokuoka and Munekatsu Date, instructing them to come to Ichigaya Hall at 11:00 am, and instructing them that someone named Kenichi Tanaka or Kenji Kurata would guide them there. The Toyota Corona, driven by Chibi-Koga, with Morita, Ogawa, and Furu-Koga as passengers, arrived at the Mishima residence at around 10:13 am.

When Chibi-Koga came to greet him at the front door, Mishima handed him envelopes containing orders addressed to Chibi-Koga, Ogawa, and Furu-Koga, along with 30,000 yen each in cash, and ordered to read them in the car. Carrying a Japanese sword, "Seki Magoroku" (関孫六), modified for military use, and a leather briefcase, Mishima walked slowly to the car and got into the passenger seat, saying, "Have you read the orders?", and adding, "You've read the orders. My orders are absolute," and "I can't imagine dying in just the next three hours."

After Mishima left his residence, Kikue Kojima came to there at around 10:40 am, run about 10 minutes behind the appointment, and was given Mishima's manuscript by his maid. When Kojima returned to the editorial office and read the manuscript, it was the "final chapter" as opposed to the original plan, and the last page was dated November 25 and signed. (Note: Many researchers have brought up that the ending scene of the last novel The Decay of the Angel is very similar to the ending scene of Mishima's first published debut work, The Forest in Full Bloom (花ざかりの森, Hanazakari no Mori). Incidentally, it became clear from Mishima's draft notes that in his plan around February 1969, the ending of this final novel was different, in which an angelic boy who is the true reincarnation of Kiyoaki Matstugae appears ahead of Honda just before he dies.)

The Toyota Corona they were in headed for the JSDF Camp Ichigaya. Under a clear autumn sky, the white Corona exited onto the Kannana-dori Avenue (環状七号線), entered the Second Keihin National Highway at about 10:20 am, and passed through from Shinagawa to Nakahara-dori Avenue (中原街道), and got onto the Shuto Expressway Meguro Route at the Ebara ramp at about 10:30 am. At around 10:40 am, the Corona got off the highway at the Iikura ramp (飯倉ランプ).

Corona passed through Akasaka and Aoyama, and arrived in front of Meiji Shrine Outer Garden, but since it was still early, Colona circled the Meiji Shrine Outer Garden twice. At this time, Mishima said, "If this were a yakuza movie, they would play music like 'Karajishi Botan', that is about Duty and Humanity (義理と人情, giri to ninjō) feelings, but we're surprisingly cheerful." Furu-Koga has looked back, "Maybe that was to prevent us from feeling sad or anxious. Sensei started singing first that movie theme song, and the four of us joined in the chorus. After singing, something touched my heart and deeply moved."

As the Corona proceeded from Gondawara-zaka Slope (権田原坂), passing Akasaka Palace on the right and Meiji Kinenkan (明治記念館) on the left, and stopped briefly at a traffic signal near the Gakushūin Elementary School (学習院初等科) building, Mishima said, "Ah, I'm now passing in front of my alma mater, for whatever reason. My child is currently attending class here at this time." The Corona went straight through the Yotsuya Mitsuke (四谷見附) intersection, cut through Yasukuni-dori Avenue (靖国通り), and headed into the main gate of the JGSDF Camp Ichigaya.

== See also ==
- Reactions to the Mishima Incident
- Views on the meaning of Mishima's death
- 11/25 The Day Mishima Chose His Own Fate - This film based on the Mishima Incident, portrays the background of the event as explained in this article.

== Sources ==
- Mishima, Yukio (2001). 決定版 三島由紀夫全集 第9巻 長編小説9 [Definitive Edition Yukio Mishima Complete Works No.9 – Novels 9] (in Japanese). Shinchosha. ISBN 978-4-10-642549-3.
- Mishima, Yukio (2003). 決定版 三島由紀夫全集 第32巻 評論7 [Definitive Edition Yukio Mishima Complete Works No.32 – Criticisms 7] (in Japanese). Shinchosha. ISBN 978-4-10-642572-1.
- Mishima, Yukio (2003). 決定版 三島由紀夫全集 第34巻 評論9 [Definitive Edition Yukio Mishima Complete Works No.34 – Criticisms 9] (in Japanese). Shinchosha. ISBN 978-4-10-642574-5.
- Mishima, Yukio (2003). 決定版 三島由紀夫全集 第35巻 評論10 [Definitive Edition Yukio Mishima Complete Works No.35 – Criticisms 10] (in Japanese). Shinchosha. ISBN 978-4-10-642575-2.
- Mishima, Yukio (2003). 決定版 三島由紀夫全集 第36巻 評論11 [Definitive Edition Yukio Mishima Complete Works No.36 – Criticisms 11] (in Japanese). Shinchosha. ISBN 978-4-10-642576-9.
- Mishima, Yukio (2004). 決定版 三島由紀夫全集 第38巻 書簡 [Definitive Edition Yukio Mishima Complete Works No.38 – Letters] (in Japanese). Shinchosha. ISBN 978-4-10-642578-3.
- Mishima, Yukio (2004). 決定版 三島由紀夫全集 第40巻 対談2 [Definitive Edition Yukio Mishima Complete Works No.40 – Dialogues 2] (in Japanese). Shinchosha. ISBN 978-4-10-642580-6.
- Mishima, Yukio (2004). 決定版 三島由紀夫全集 第41巻 音声(CD) [Definitive Edition Yukio Mishima Complete Works No.41 – Voices (CD)] (in Japanese). Shinchosha. ISBN 978-4-10-642581-3.
- Satō, Hideaki; Inoue, Takashi; Yamanaka, Takeshi, eds. (2005). 決定版 三島由紀夫全集 第42巻 年譜・書誌 [Definitive Edition Yukio Mishima Complete Works No.42 – Biographical Sketch and Bibliography] (in Japanese). Shinchosha. ISBN 978-4-10-642582-0.
- Mishima, Yukio (2005). Tanaka, Miyoko; Satō, Hideaki (eds.). 決定版 三島由紀夫全集 補巻 補遺・索引 [Definitive Edition Yukio Mishima Complete Works Supplementary Volume – Addenda, Indexes] (in Japanese). Shinchosha. ISBN 978-4-10-642583-7.
- Mishima, Yukio (1995) [1st pub. Kodansha:1964]. 私の遍歴時代 [My Wandering Years]. Chikuma Bunko – Yukio Mishima Essay 1 (in Japanese) (Paperback ed.). Chikuma Shobō. ISBN 978-4-480-03028-3.
- Mishima, Yukio (1996) [1st pub. Nippon Kyobunsha:1969]. 若きサムライのために [Spiritual Lectures for the Young Samurai]. Bunshun Bunko (in Japanese) (Paperback ed.). Bungeishunjū. ISBN 978-4-16-712403-8.
- Mishima, Yukio; Tokyo University Zenkyōtō (2000) [1st pub. Shinchosha:1969]. 討論 三島由紀夫vs.東大全共闘―美と共同体と東大闘争 [Debate: Yukio Mishima vs. Tokyo University Zenkyōtō – Beauty, Community, and the Tokyo University Struggle]. Kadokawa Bunko (in Japanese) (Paperback ed.). Kadokawa Shoten. ISBN 978-4-04-121208-0.
- Mishima, Yukio (2006) [1st pub. Shinchosha:1969]. 文化防衛論 [On the Defense of Culture]. Chikuma Bunko (in Japanese) (Paperback ed.). Chikuma Shobō. ISBN 978-4-480-42283-5.
- Mishima, Yukio; Kawabata, Yasunari (2000) [1st pub. 1997]. 川端康成・三島由紀夫往復書簡 [Correspondence between Yasunari Kawabata and Yukio Mishima]. Shincho Bunko (in Japanese) (Paperback ed.). Shinchosha. ISBN 978-4-10-100126-5.
- Mishima, Yukio (2001) [1st pub. 1998]. 三島由紀夫未発表書簡 ドナルド・キーン氏宛の97通 [Yukio Mishima's Unpublished Letters: 97 Letters to Donald Keene]. Chuko Bunko (in Japanese) (Paperback ed.). Chuokoron-Shinsha. ISBN 978-4-12-203802-8.
- Akiyama, Shun; others (1990). 三島由紀夫 [Yukio Mishima]. Gunzo – Japanese Authors 18 (in Japanese). Shogakukan. ISBN 978-4-09-567018-8.
- Andō, Takeshi (1998). 三島由紀夫の生涯 [The Life of Yukio Mishima] (in Japanese). Natsume Shobo. ISBN 978-4-931391-39-0.
- Chujō, Shōhei, ed. (2005). 続・三島由紀夫が死んだ日―あの日は、どうしていまも生々しいのか [Sequel - The Day Yukio Mishima Died: Why is That Day Still So Vivid to Us] (in Japanese). Jitsugyo no Nihon Sha. ISBN 978-4-408-53482-4.
- Date, Munekatsu (1972). 裁判記録「三島由紀夫事件」 [Judicial Record of the "Mishima Incident"] (in Japanese). Kodansha. NCID BN0140450X.
- Fukushima, Jurō (2005) [1st pub. Shinjinbutu Ōraisha:1975]. 再訂資料・三島由紀夫 [Re-Edition Document - Yukio Mishima] (in Japanese) (Enlarged ed.). Chobunsha. ISBN 978-4-88695-180-9.
- Hamasaki, Yōsuke (2020). 三島由紀夫―なぜ、死んでみせねばならなかったのか [Yukio Mishima: Why did He have to Show His Dying]. The Essence of Postwar Thought (in Japanese). NHK Publishing, Inc. ISBN 978-4-14-081832-9.
- Hasegawa, Izumi, ed. (1971). 現代のエスプリ 三島由紀夫 [Modern Esprit Yukio Mishima] (in Japanese). Shibundo. NCID BN09636225.
- Hasegawa, Izumi; Takeda, Katsuhiko, eds. (1976). 三島由紀夫事典 [Encyclopedia of Yukio Mishima] (in Japanese). Meiji Shoin. ISBN 978-4-625-40025-4. NCID BN01686605.
- Hayashi, Fusao (1972). 悲しみの琴―三島由紀夫への鎮魂歌 [The Harp of Sorrows: Requiem for Yukio Mishima] (in Japanese). Bungeishunjū. NCID BN08146344.
- Hiraoka, Azusa (1996) [1st pub. 1972]. 伜・三島由紀夫 [My Son – Yukio Mishima]. Bunshu Bunko (in Japanese) (Paperback ed.). Bungeishunjū. ISBN 978-4-16-716204-7.
- Hiraoka, Azusa (1974). 伜・三島由紀夫（没後） [My Son – Yukio Mishima (After death)] (in Japanese). Bungeishunjū. NCID BN03950861.
- Hori, Yukio (1993) [1st pub. 1983]. 戦後の右翼勢力 [Right-wing Forces of Postwar] (in Japanese) (Enlarged ed.). Keiso Shobo. ISBN 978-4-326-35040-7.
- Hosaka, Masayasu (2001) [1st pub. Kodansha:1980]. 三島由紀夫と楯の会事件 [Yukio Mishima and the Tatenokai Incident]. Kadokawa Bunko (in Japanese) (Enlarged/Revised ed.). Kadokawa Shoten. ISBN 978-4-04-355602-1.
- Inose, Naoki (1999) [1st pub. 1995]. ペルソナ―三島由紀夫伝 [Persona: A Biography of Yukio Mishima]. Bunshun Bunko (in Japanese) (Paperback ed.). Bungeishunjū. ISBN 978-4-16-743109-9.
- Inose, Naoki; Satō, Hiroaki (2012). Persona: A Biography of Yukio Mishima. Berkeley, California: Stone Bridge Press. ISBN 978-1-61172-008-2.
- Inoue, Takashi (2010). 三島由紀夫 幻の遺作を読む―もう一つの『豊饒の海』 [Reading a Never-before-published Phantom Posthumous Work of Yukio Mishima: Another "The Sea of Fertility"]. Kobunsha Shinsho (in Japanese). Kobunsha. ISBN 978-4-334-03594-5.
- Inoue, Toyoo (2006). 果し得ていない約束―三島由紀夫が遺せしもの [The Promise Left Unfulfilled: What Yukio Mishima Left Behind] (in Japanese). Cosmo no Hon. ISBN 978-4-906380-80-0.
- Inuzuka, Kiyoshi (2020). 三島由紀夫と死んだ男―森田必勝の生涯 [The Man who Died with Yukio Mishima: The Life of Masakatsu Morita] (in Japanese). Shumei University Shuppan-kai. ISBN 978-4-915855-40-5.
- Ishihara, Shintaro (2025) [1st pub. Shinchosha:1991]. 三島由紀夫の日蝕 完全版 [The Solar Eclipse of Yukio Mishima – Complete Version] (in Japanese) (Enlarged ed.). Jitsugyo no Nihon Sha. ISBN 978-4-408-65132-3. - It includes six postcards and letters from Mishima that were newly discovered among Ishihara's belongings.
- Itō, Katsuhiko (2002). 三島由紀夫の沈黙―その死と江藤淳・石原慎太郎 [The Silence of Yukio Mishima: His Death and Jun Etō, Shintaro Ishihara] (in Japanese). Tōshindo. ISBN 978-4-88713-448-5.
- Kawashima, Masaru (1996). 三島由紀夫 [Yukio Mishima] (in Japanese). Bungeishunjū. ISBN 978-4-16-351280-8.
- Kitakage, Yukō (2006). 三島由紀夫と葉隠武士道 [Yukio Mishima and Hagakure Bushido] (in Japanese). Hakua Shobo. ISBN 978-4-89172-683-6.
- Kojima, Chikako (1996) [1st pub. Kōsōsha:1980]. 三島由紀夫と檀一雄 [Yukio Mishima and Kazuo Dan]. Chikuma Bunko (in Japanese) (Paperback ed.). Chikuma Shobō. ISBN 978-4-480-03182-2.
- Komuro, Naoki (1985). 三島由紀夫が復活する [Yukio Mishima will be Resurrected] (in Japanese). Mainichi Communications. NCID BN10913162.
- Matsufuji, Takejirō (2007). 三島由紀夫「残された手帳」 [Yukio Mishima "A Notebook Left Behind"] (in Japanese). Mainichi Wanz. ISBN 978-4-901622-24-0.
- Matsumoto, Ken'ichi (2007) [1st pub. Kawade Shobō Shinsha:1987]. 三島由紀夫亡命伝説 [The Legend of Yukio Mishima's Exile]. Ken'ichi Matsumoto Legend Series 2 (in Japanese) (Enlarged ed.). Henkyōsha. ISBN 978-4-326-95039-3.
- Matsumoto, Tōru (1990). 三島由紀夫 年表作家読本 [Yukio Mishima: Author's Chronological Reader] (in Japanese). Kawade Shobō Shinsha. ISBN 978-4-309-70052-6.
- Matsumoto, Tōru; Satō, Hideaki; Inoue, Takashi, eds. (2000). 三島由紀夫事典 [Encyclopedia of Yukio Mishima] (in Japanese). Bensei Shuppan. ISBN 978-4-585-06018-5.
- Matsuura, Yoshiko; Matsuura, Hiroshi (supervisor) (2020) [1st pub. 2010]. 自決より五十年 三島由紀夫と「楯の会」―「後をたのむ」と託された思い [50 Years after Their Suicide: Yukio Mishima and the Tatenokai – The Feeling of being entrusted with "I'll leave it to you after."] (in Japanese) (Enlarged ed.). Takagi Shobo. ISBN 978-4-88471-819-0.
- Miyazaki, Masahiro (1999). 三島由紀夫「以後」―日本が日本でなくなる日 ["After" Yukio Mishima: The Day When Japan is No Longer Japan] (in Japanese). Namiki Shobo. ISBN 978-4-89063-112-4.
- Miyazaki, Masahiro (2014). 吉田松陰が復活する！―憂国の論理と行動 [Yoshida Shōin will be Resurrected!: The Logic of Patriotism and the Actions] (in Japanese). Namiki Shobo. ISBN 978-4-89063-323-4.
- Miyoshi, Yukio, ed. (1989). 三島由紀夫必携 [Yukio Mishima Must-Have] (in Japanese). Gakutōsha. ISBN 978-4-312-00522-9.
- Mochimaru, Hiroshi; Satō, Matsuo (2010). 証言 三島由紀夫・福田恆存 たった一度の対決 [Testimonies: The Only Once Confrontation between Yukio Mishima and Tsuneari Fukuda] (in Japanese). Bungeishunjū. ISBN 978-4-16-373250-3.
- Morita, Masakatsu (2002) [1st pub. 1971]. わが思想と行動―遺稿集 [My Thoughts and Actions: His Posthumous Manuscripts] (in Japanese) (New Format ed.). Nisshin Hōdō. ISBN 978-4-8174-0528-9.
- Murakami, Takeo (2010). 君たちには分からない―「楯の會」で見た三島由紀夫 [You Guys don't Understand: Yukio Mishima that I Saw in "Tatenokai"] (in Japanese). Shinchosha. ISBN 978-4-10-327851-1.
- Muramatsu, Takeshi (1990). 三島由紀夫の世界 [The World of Yukio Mishima] (in Japanese). Shinchosha. ISBN 978-4-10-321402-1.
- Muramatsu, Takeshi (1994). 西欧との対決―漱石から三島、遠藤まで [Confrontations with Western Europe: From Sōseki to Mishima to Endō] (in Japanese). Shinchosha. ISBN 978-4-10-321403-8.
- Murata, Haruki (2015). 三島由紀夫が生きた時代―楯の会と森田必勝 [The Period when Yukio Mishima was Alive: The Tatenokai and Masakatsu Morita] (in Japanese). Seirindo. ISBN 978-4-7926-0532-2.
- Murata, Haruki (2023). 三島由紀夫は蓮田善明の後を追った―開かれた皇室への危惧 [Yukio Mishima Followed in Zenmei Hasuda's footsteps: Concerns over the Open Imperial Family] (in Japanese). Tendensha. ISBN 978-4-88656-569-3.
- Nagawa, Yumiko (2023). 手記 三島由紀夫様 私は森田必勝の恋人でした [Notes: To Mr. Yukio Mishima, I was Masakatsu Morita's Girlfriend] (in Japanese). Shumei University Shuppan-kai. ISBN 978-4-915855-47-4. Her maiden name is Shibata.
- Nakamura, Akihiko (2015) [1st pub. Bungeishunjū:2000]. 三島事件 もう一人の主役―烈士と呼ばれた森田必勝 [Another Protagonist of the Mishima Incident: Masakatsu Morita who Called an Upright Man] (in Japanese) (Enlarged ed.). WAC inc. ISBN 978-4-89831-729-7.
- Nathan, John (1975) [1st pub. Little, Brown and Company:1974]. Mishima: A Biography. Tut books. North Clarendon, Vermont: Tuttle Publishing. ISBN 978-4805304020.
  - Nathan, John (2000). Mishima: A Biography (New ed.). Boston, Massachusetts: Da Capo Press. ISBN 978-0-306-80977-4.
- Nathan, John (2000) [1st pub. 1976 (an out-of-print book)]. 新版 三島由紀夫─ある評伝 [New Edition – Mishima: A Biography] (in Japanese). Translated by Noguchi, Takehiko (New/Revised ed.). Shinchosha. ISBN 978-4-10-505702-2.
- Nihon Gakusei Shimbun, ed. (1971). 回想の三島由紀夫 [Yukio Mishima in Reminiscence] (in Japanese). Gyōsei Tsūshinsha. NCID BN0927582X.
- Nishi, Hōtaro (2020). 三島由紀夫事件 50年目の証言―警察と自衛隊は何を知っていたか [Yukio Mishima Incident – Testimonies of 50 Years Later: What did the Police and the Self-Defense Forces Know] (in Japanese). Shinchosha. ISBN 978-4-10-353581-2.
- Nishimura, Shigeki (2019). 三島由紀夫と最後に会った青年将校 [The Young Officer who Met Yukio Mishima Last] (in Japanese). Namiki Shobo. ISBN 978-4-89063-391-3.
- Noguchi, Takehiko (1985). 三島由紀夫と北一輝 [Yukio Mishima and Ikki Kita] (in Japanese). Fukumura Shuppan. NCID BN01070867.
- Okamura, Ao (2020) [1st pub. Gendai Shokan:1990]. 三島由紀夫と森田必勝―楯の会事件 若き行動者の軌跡 [Yukio Mishima and Masakatsu Morita: The Tatenokai Incident, the Trajectory of a Young Activist]. Kōjinsha NF Bunko (in Japanese) (Paperback ed.). Ushio Shobo Kōjin Shinsha. ISBN 978-4-7698-3191-4.
- Okayama, Norihiro (2014). 三島由紀夫外伝 [The Side Story of Yukio Mishima] (in Japanese). Sairyusha. ISBN 978-4-7791-7022-5.
- Okuno, Takeo (2000) [1st pub. 1993]. 三島由紀夫伝説 [Legend of Yukio Mishima]. Shincho Bunko (in Japanese) (Revised/Paperback ed.). Shinchosha. ISBN 978-4-10-135602-0.
- Sakurai, Hidenori (2020). 三島由紀夫は何を遺したか [What did Yukio Mishima Leave Behind] (in Japanese). Kizuna Shuppan. ISBN 978-4-86663-128-8.
- Satō, Hideaki; Yamanaka, Takeshi; Matsumoto, Tōru, eds. (2024). 三島由紀夫のエンターテインメント〈三島由紀夫研究24〉 [Yukio Mishima's Entertainment]. Research of Yukio Mishima 24 (in Japanese). Kanae Shobo. ISBN 978-4-907282-97-4.
- Satō, Hideaki (2020). 三島由紀夫 悲劇への欲動 [Yukio Mishima: Instinctual Drive for Tragedy]. Iwanami Shisho 1852 (in Japanese). Iwanami Shoten. ISBN 978-4-00-431852-1.
- Scott-Stokes, Henry (1975) [1st pub. Ballantine Books:1974]. The Life and Death of Yukio Mishima. Tut books. North Clarendon, Vermont: Tuttle Publishing. ISBN 978-4805303917.
  - Scott-Stokes, Henry (2000). The Life and Death of Yukio Mishima (Enlarged/Revised ed.). New York City: Cooper Square Press. ISBN 978-0-8154-1074-4.
- Scott-Stokes, Henry (1985). 三島由紀夫─死と真実 [The Life and Death of Yukio Mishima] (in Japanese). Translated by Tokuoka, Takao. Diamond, Inc. ISBN 978-4-478-94056-3.
  - Scott-Stokes, Henry (1998). 三島由紀夫─生と死 [The Life and Death of Yukio Mishima] (in Japanese). Translated by Tokuoka, Takao (Enlarged/Revised ed.). Seiryu Publ. ISBN 978-4-916028-52-5.
- Seikai, Ken (2000). 三島由紀夫の帰還―青海健評論集 [The Return of Yukio Mishima: Ken Seikai's Criticism Collection] (in Japanese). Ozawa Shoten. ISBN 978-4-7551-0393-3.
- Shibata, Shōji (2012). 三島由紀夫 作品に隠された自決への道 [Yukio Mishima: The Path to Suicide Hidden in His Works] (in Japanese). Shodensha. ISBN 978-4-396-11300-1.
- Shiine, Yamato (2009) [1st pub. 2007]. 平凡パンチの三島由紀夫 [Yukio Mishima from Heibon Punch]. Shincho Bunko (in Japanese) (Paperback ed.). Shinchosha. ISBN 978-4-10-128881-9.
- Sugiyama, Takao (2007). 「兵士」になれなかった三島由紀夫 [Yukio Mishima, who could not Become a "Soldier"]. Soldier Series (in Japanese). Shogakukan. ISBN 978-4-09-379773-3.
- Suizu, Kenji (1971). 三島由紀夫の悲劇―病跡学的考察 [The Tragedy of Yukio Mishima: A Pathographic Study] (in Japanese). Toshi Shuppansha. NCID BN04848339.
- Suzuki, Ayumi; Tamura, Tsukasa (supervisor) (2005). 火群のゆくへ―元楯の会会員たちの心の軌跡 [Whereabouts of the Flames: The Trajectories of Their Hearts who once Belonged to the Tatenokai] (in Japanese). Hakurosha. ISBN 978-4-434-07066-2.
- Tekina, Osamu (2015). ミシマの警告―保守を偽装するB層の害毒 [Mishima's Warnings: The Poison of the B-class Disguised as Conservative] (in Japanese). Kodansha. ISBN 978-4-06-272784-6.
- Tekina, Osamu (2016). Takarajimasha (ed.). 三島由紀夫 100の言葉―日本を心の底から愛するための心得 [Yukio Mishima's 100 Words: A Guide for Loving Japan from the Bottom of Your Heart] (in Japanese). Takarajimasha. ISBN 978-4-8002-5519-8.
- Tekina, Osamu (2020). 日本人は豚になる―三島由紀夫の予言 [The Japanese will Become Pigs: Yukio Mishima's Prophecies] (in Japanese). Bestsellers. ISBN 978-4-584-13973-8.
- Tokuoka, Takao (1999) [1st pub. 1996]. 五衰の人―三島由紀夫私記 [The Man of the Decay of the Angel: Private Notes about Yukio Mishima] (in Japanese) (Paperback ed.). Bungeishunjū. ISBN 978-4-16-744903-2.
- Tokuoka, Takao; Keene, Donald (2020) [1st pub. Chuokoron-sha:1973]. 三島由紀夫を巡る旅―悼友紀行 [A Journey through Yukio Mishima: A Travelogue in Memory of a Friend]. Shincho Bunko (in Japanese) (Reprinted/Paperback ed.). Shinchosha. ISBN 978-4-10-131356-6.
- Yamamoto, Kiyokatsu (1980). 三島由紀夫・憂悶の祖国防衛賦―市ケ谷決起への道程と真相 [Yukio Mishima – An Anguish Verse of Fatherland Defense: The Path to the Ichigaya Uprising and the Truth] (in Japanese). Nihon Bungeisha. ISBN 978-4-537-00517-2. NCID BN10688248.
- Yamamoto, Kiyokatsu (2001). 自衛隊「影の部隊」―三島由紀夫を殺した真実の告白 [Japan Self-Defense Forces "A Unit of Shadow": Confession of a Truth that Killed Yukio Mishima] (in Japanese). Kodansha. ISBN 978-4-06-210781-5.
- Yamamoto, Mitsunobu (2017). 私の中の三島由紀夫 [Yukio Mishima in Me] (in Japanese). Hakurosha. ISBN 978-4-434-23098-1.
- Yamauchi, Yukito (2014). 三島由紀夫の肉体 [Yukio Mishima's Body] (in Japanese). Kawade Shobō Shinsha. ISBN 978-4-309-02318-2.
- Yokoyama, Shigehiko (2024). 三島由紀夫 街歩き手帖 [Yukio Mishima: Town Walking Notebook] (in Japanese). Ohta Publishing. ISBN 978-4-7783-1975-5.
- Chuokoron-Shinsha, ed. (2010). 中央公論特別編集 三島由紀夫と戦後 [Chūō Kōron Special Edition – Yukio Mishima and the Postwar Period] (in Japanese). Chuokoron-Shinsha. ISBN 978-4-12-004161-7.
- Kawade Shobō Shinsha, ed. (1990). 新文芸読本 三島由紀夫 [New Literary Reader: Yukio Mishima] (in Japanese). Kawade Shobō Shinsha. ISBN 978-4-309-70155-4.
- Kodansha, ed. (1971). 群像 1971年2月・特大号 三島由紀夫 死と芸術 [Gunzo – February 1971 Extra Large Issue – Yukio Mishima, His Death and Art] (in Japanese). Kodansha. ASIN B01NH2WT0X.
- Roman Co., ed. (1975). 浪曼 新年号（12・1月合併号） 特集・三島由紀夫の不在 [Roman New Year Issue (December/January Combined Number) – Special Feature: The Absence of Yukio Mishima] (in Japanese). Roman Co.
- 新潮社 (1990). Shinchosha (ed.). 新潮 12月・特大号 没後二十年 三島由紀夫特集 [Shinchō – December Extra Large Issue: Yukio Mishima 20 Years After His Death] (in Japanese). Shinchosha. doi:10.11501/6078693.
