= Shūsuke =

- Gender: Male

Origin
- Origin: Japanese
- Meaning: Different meanings depending on the kanji used

Shūsuke, Shusuke or Shuusuke (written: 修介, 秀介, 秋介 or 周輔) is a masculine Japanese given name. Notable people with the name include:

- Shusuke Kaneko (金子 修介; born 1955), Japanese filmmaker and screenwriter
- Shūsuke Nomura (野村 秋介; 1935–1993), Japanese activist
- Shusuke Ota (太田 修介; born 1996), Japanese footballer
- Shusuke Shimada (島田 周輔; born 1976), former Japanese footballer
- Shusuke Tsubouchi (坪内 秀介; born 1983), Japanese footballer
