= Anti-American conservative =

Japanese political term

Anti-American conservative (Japanese: 反米保守, Hepburn: han-Bei hoshu) is a term used in Japan to describe right-leaning or conservative individuals who hold critical views towards the United States, particularly on matters of foreign policy, defense or cultural influence.

In contemporary Japanese politics, mainstream consensus – especially those affiliated with the Liberal Democratic Party (LDP) tends to maintain a pro-American stance, emphasizing on the importance of the Japanese-American alliance. While anti-American sentiment is common among the Japanese pacifist left, some conservatives have expressed opposition to perceived American domination on Japanese foreign and defense matters or to American cultural influence.

== History ==
=== Prewar Japan ===
In the Edo period, there was a "Kokugaku" to preserve traditional philosophy against Western philosophy inflows, including in the United States. In addition, anti-American conservatism emerged through "Nōhon shugi" (農本主義, lit. Agrarianism) and "Pan-Asianism" (アジア主義, lit. Asianism) during the Meiji period.

During the prewar Shōwa period, "Ultra-nationalism" (超国家主義, chō kokka shugi, lit. "extreme state-ism") emerged, and to justify Japan's invasion of the Asian region, the cause of "liberating Asia from the West" was put forward; at this time, there was 鬼畜米英 (kichiku beiei), racist propaganda meaning "American and British demonic beasts".

=== Postwar Japan ===
In postwar Japan, "anti-American conservatives" are relatively few in number among institutional conservatives; the Liberal Democratic Party (LDP) is widely known as being "pro-American conservative" (親米保守).

From the 1960s onwards, an ethno-nationalist movement called "minzoku-ha" (民族派) emerged, which was critical of major conservatives of the day for prioritizing "anti-communism" over "[ethnic] nationalism".

Today, anti-American conservatives have a wide spectrum; some are negative for the United States for harming Asian values, and some are ultranationalists who are hostile to China and Korea (both South and North) and seek a return to the Empire of Japan, but all anti-American conservatives have a common negative view of cultural globalization (led by the West) and neoliberal economic policy.

In 2008, Toshio Tamogami, the former Chief of Staff of Japan’s Air Self-Defense Force became a controversial figure after publishing the essay “Was Japan an Aggressor Nation?”, which denied Japanese wartime responsibility and criticized the United States as a corrupting and unreliable ally which led to his dismissal from the military. His subsequent book Mizukara no Mi ha Kaerimizu (I Don't Repent) intensified these views through explicit denial of the Nanjing Massacre, conspiracy-laden anti-American rhetoric and calls for Japan to reject what he portrayed as cultural, political, and strategic subordination to the United States. While acknowledging the importance of the US–Japan alliance in principle, Tamogami depicted it as humiliating and dangerous, arguing that dependence on the United States undermines Japan’s sovereignty, distorts its culture and prevents independent action. His worldview aligns with a broader strand of Japanese neo-conservatism that combines distrust of the United States, advocacy of constitutional revision and nuclear armament, hostility toward China and the Koreas and an insistence on defending a “heroic” interpretation of Japan’s wartime past. Critics characterized his arguments as historically revisionist, backward-looking and destabilizing, emphasizing that they prioritize national pride and reputation over historical accountability and future regional cooperation.

Tanzan Ishibashi, who opposed Japanese imperialism in prewar Japan, was one of the LDP politicians most unfriendly to the United States in postwar Japan. In contrast, Ishibashi had a doveish diplomat in the People's Republic of China.

The Japanese Society for History Textbook Reform, a Japanese nationalist group, is known for its "anti-American conservatism".

== See also ==
- Asian Monroeism
- Greater East Asia War, a term referring to the "Pacific War" by the Japanese government before 1945, and Now it's used by anti-American conservatives or Japanese ultranationalists.
- Nihon shugi
- Sonnō jōi
- Theory of subordination to the United States
- Tatenokai
- Yukio Mishima
