= Hasuda Zenmei =

Japanese literary critic, teacher and poet

- 蓮田 善明
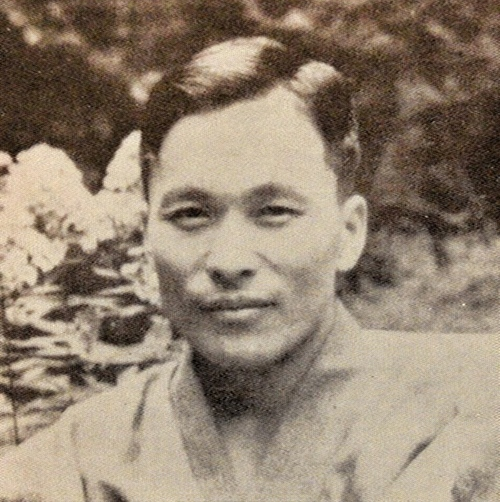
- Born: 28 July 1904; Ueki, Kumamoto, Japan
- Died: 19 August 1945 (aged 41); Johor Bahru, Johor, Malaysia
- Cause of death: Suicide by gunshot
- Family: Hasuda Jizen (father)
- Military career
- Allegiance: Empire of Japan
- Branch: Imperial Japanese Army
- Rank: Lieutenant
- Conflicts: Second Sino-Japanese War; World War II; Pacific War
- Other work: Historian, author and kokugaku scholar

Hasuda Zenmei (蓮田 善明; 28 July 1904 – 19 August 1945) was a Japanese nationalist, Shinto fundamentalist, and scholar of kokugaku as well as classical Japanese literature. He was also a historian, author, and military officer.

== Biography ==
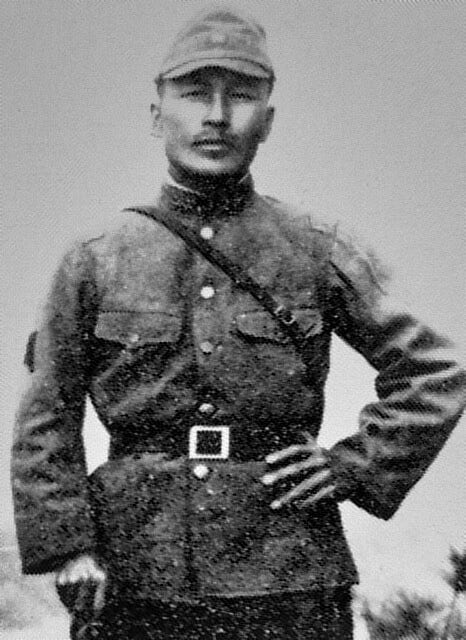
Hasuda Zenmei during the Second World War

Hasuda was born in 1904 into the family of Hasuda Jizen (蓮田 慈善; 1851–1938), abbot of the Ōtani Jōdo Konrenji (金蓮寺) temple in the town of Ueki. His father possessed a sword that once belonged to Katō Kiyomasa.

In 1918, he contracted pleurisy and took a leave of absence from school until the following year. Around this time he wrote one of his early poems, People Are Made to Die (人は死ぬものである, Hito wa shinumono dearu). Pleurisy haunted him for the remainder of his life, and several years before his death he was found to have lesions in his hilar nodes.

He was known for his simultaneous pursuit of literature and martial arts.

After entering college in 1923, he became influenced by Prof. Saitō Kiyoe and developed an interest in kokugaku, by that time a mostly abandoned discipline, and studied the writings of Motoori Norinaga. Hasuda was strongly impressed with the book by historian Ishihara Shiko'o on the Shinpūren Rebellion, League of the Divine Wind: A History of Blood and Tears (神風連血涙史, Shinpūren Ketsuruishi). Ishihara elaborated upon the teachings of the nativist Hayashi Ōen, according to whom the affairs of government ought to be entirely subordinated to the affairs of Shinto through systematic divination, a position that Hasuda respected.

The true meaning of "expel the barbarians" was ultimately guarding and passing on Japan's exceptional national history. However, even now this motive is not well understood. People today keep such things at arm's length, hurling insults [at those who advocated it], calling [them] backward and narrow-minded. But that is the fundamental idea which was handed down by generation after generation of scholars of national studies, who believed in it with the purest sincerity and defended it to the very end even as it became madness in the eyes of the world.

— Hasuda Zenmei, Heart of the Shinpūren (神風連のこころ, Shinpūren no kokoro) (1942)

Through Shimizu Fumio, Hasuda became acquainted with the young Hiraoka Kimitake, later known as Yukio Mishima. On October 25, 1943, Hasuda was called to active service in the Imperial Japanese Army. Before his departure for Southeast Asia, he reportedly said to Mishima, "I entrust the future of Japan to you" (日本のあとのことをおまえに託した, Nihon no ato no koto o omae ni takushita). Kuriyama Riichi recalled Hasuda raging as he prepared to leave, saying "Those American bastards..." (あのアメリカの奴め等が…, Ano Amerika no yatsumera ga…).

In 1945, Hasuda's platoon advanced to Shōnan where he was assigned to a mortar regiment headquartered at the Royal Palace of Johor. Immediately after Hasuda and his men arrived in Singapore, one of his subordinates got into a fight with an officer of the Kenpeitai and injured him. When the subordinate was about to be punished by the regimental authorities, Hasuda suggested that he, as the platoon commander, was responsible for the subordinate's negligence, and he and his captain went to personally apologize. The subordinate's punishment was dropped.

At the time of Hirohito's order to surrender, Hasuda had a conversation with another an officer named Takagi (高木). Takagi said, "Now [that we've been defeated], in the future when Japanese children are asked 'Who is the most important man in Japan?' they will say either Roosevelt or Chiang Kai-shek." Enraged, Hasuda shouted, "That is an idiotic thing to say. As long as Japan exists, as long as the Japanese race exists, the Emperor will be supreme, and no matter who teaches them, the children of Japan will always revere him as supreme." Takagi said, "That's merely an ideal." Still fuming, Hasuda said, "Just because we were defeated doesn't make it any less crucial." Takagi shot back, saying, "What a joke. We don't even know whether or not we'll make it home alive. As the regiment commander suggested, instead of wasting time with useless ideology, shouldn't we be figuring out how to get back alive in the fall?" Hasuda replied, "Whether we return alive or dead, we must never abandon the Japanese spirit!"

Hasuda's regiment commander Colonel Nakajō Toyoma (中条豊馬) announced that the division would surrender immediately to British forces. Upon hearing Nakajō's statement, Hasuda flew into a rage. By that point, Hasuda had already become convinced that Nakajō was in fact a Korean spy who had sabotaged the division and whose real name was "Kim" (金). Hasuda had brought his father's sword with him, and wanted to use it to kill Nakajō. However, he was unskilled in kendō and hesitated, deciding to use his Nanbu pistol instead. When Nakajō was proceeding to Shōnan Shrine to burn the regimental flags prior to surrender, Hasuda ambushed his entourage.

Accusing the others of treason, he shot Nakajō to death and then immediately put the pistol to his own temple and pulled the trigger. The pistol misfired, but bystanders did not interfere. Hasuda manually cycled the pistol to clear the jam and shot himself in the head. After his death, a postcard was found on his person into which he had written "For the sake of Japan, I am left with no choice but to cut down these wicked traitors and become a sacrificed stone of the Empire" (日本のため、やむにやまれず、奸賊を斬り皇国日本の捨石となる, Nihon no tame, yamu ni yamarezu, kanzoku o kiri kōkoku Nihon no suteishi to naru)(the idea of a sacrificed stone is an allusion to the game of Go, in which a stone played on the board may be sacrificed to the opponent as part of a strategy to achieve a higher goal). He was cremated by Japanese personnel in Johor Bahru.

After the war, the Allied powers did not allow Hasuda's remains to be returned to Japan. As a result, his bones were disposed of in an unmarked grave in a rubber tree orchard near Singapore.
