= Tatenokai =

Nationalist private militia in Japan (1968–70)

- 楯の會
- Flag originally used by the Shield Society during military parades
- Other name: Shield Society
- Leader: Yukio Mishima
- Dates active: 1968–1970
- Country: Japan
- Allegiance: Emperor of Japan
- Ideology: Japanese nationalism Ultranationalism; Traditionalism; Anti-communism; Monarchism
- Political position: Far-right; Minzoku-ha (Japanese new right)
- Status: Dissolved
- Size: 100

The Tatenokai (楯の会, 楯の會) or Shield Society was a private militia in Japan dedicated to traditional Japanese values and veneration of the Emperor. It was founded and led by author Yukio Mishima. The private militia was officially founded in 1968 for the purpose of preventing indirect aggression by proponents of foreign ideology seeking to destroy Japanese traditional culture, and protecting the dignity of the Emperor as a symbol of Japan's national identity.

The name of Tatenokai comes from two classical waka, one from the 7th century Asuka period and the other from the 19th century Edo period, which express the determination to become a shield to protect the Emperor.

== Background ==
The Tatenokai was a militia organization that took over from its predecessor, the "Japan National Guard" (祖国防衛隊, Sokoku Bōeitai), which was founded in 1967. The original members were the staff of New Right monthly magazine Controversy Journal (論争ジャーナル, Ronsō jaanaru) and several Waseda University students. They had enlisted in the Japan Self-Defense Forces (JSDF) with Yukio Mishima in 1967, and after changing its name to Tatenokai, the group gradually increased its membership by allowing new students to enlist in the JSDF.

The Tatenokai was officially founded on October 5, 1968. Mishima decided to increase the size of the private army due to his growing alarm over the scale of left-wing protests in Japan and to this end placed recruitment advertisements in right-wing newspapers. Membership ultimately rose to 100 members, most of whom were students at Waseda University. Along with outdoor activities, the members, who joined voluntarily, were subjected to rigorous physical training that included kendo and long-distance running.

== Origin of the Name ==
The name "Tatenokai" (楯の会) was inspired by two traditional Japanese waka poems: A poem from the "Poems of Defenders" (防人の歌, Sakimori no uta) series (Note: "Sakimori" (防人) were soldiers stationed in Kyushu during the ancient Asuka and Heian periods to guard against incursions by the Tang dynasty and Silla. The defenders numbered about 3,000, and most of them were from the eastern part of Japan (東国, Azuma no kuni; present-day Kantō region).) included in the Man'yōshū, and a poem by 19th century poet Tachibana Akemi.

今日よりは 顧みなくて 大君の 醜の御楯と 出で立つ我は

(Kyō yori wa Kaeri minakute Ōkimi no Shiko no mi-tate to Idetatsu ware wa) (Note: The meaning of "ugly" (醜, shiko) here expresses a feeling of self-deprecation and humility.)

From today onwards / without any regard for myself, / I set out to become, / (although my shield may be insignificant) / a strong shield for the Great Lord Emperor. — Imamatsuribe no Yosō (今奉部與曾布), "Poem of a Defender" (防人の歌, Sakimori no uta)

大皇の 醜の御楯と いふ物は 如此る物ぞと 進め真前に

(Ōkimi no Shiko no mi-tate to Iu mono wa Kakaru mono zo to Susume masaki ni)

For the Great Lord Emperor / (although my shield may be insignificant) / thinking this is what a strong shield should be / I bravely forge ahead. — 橘曙覧 (Tachibana Akemi)

Initially, they planned to write the name "Mitatekai" (御楯会) in all kanji, like the "Mitategumi" (御楯組), a sonnō jōi organization active in Chōshū Domain during the Bakumatsu (end of the Edo period), however, some members felt that using only kanji was too stiff, so they decided to add the hiragana "no" (の) to make it "Tatenokai" (楯の会) to add a softer nuance.

== 1970 coup attempt ==
On November 25, 1970 Mishima and four Tatenokai members briefly seized control of the Japan Self-Defense Force's headquarters and attempted to rally the soldiers to stage a coup d'état, and unsuccessfully tried to inspire the JSDF to rise up and overthrow Article 9 of the 1947 Constitution to restore autonomous national defense and the divinity of the emperor, after which Mishima and Masakatsu Morita, the Tatenokai's student leader, committed seppuku (ritual suicide). The rest of the members, around 90 people, were not informed about Mishima's plan at all.

=== Participants ===
- Yukio Mishima, Captain
  - Born: January 14, 1925 – Died: November 25, 1970
- Masakatsu Morita, Student leader, Waseda University
  - Born: July 25, 1945 – Died: November 25, 1970
  - 1st generation member, the leader of 1st team
  - a "suicide squad" (決死隊, Kesshi-tai) member capable of slashing in Tatenokai
  - Morita was born in Yokkaichi-shi, Mie Prefecture, he lost his father and mother to illness one after another when he was a toddler (the year he turns 3 years old), and was raised by his brother, who was 16 years older than him, and other his older sisters. When his older brother and sisters got married, he was left in the care of his childless aunt, and when the aunt's husband died, he grew up living with his aunt in an outhouse on his older brother's house. Morita grew up to be a cheerful and lively person, but his high school diary was filled with his having a romantic notion of death, and his longing for his mother and father, who were likely living happily together in heaven.
- Masayoshi Koga (小賀正義), Kanagawa University
  - Born: July 31, 1948 –
  - 2nd generation member, the leader of 5th team
  - a "Kesshi-tai" member capable of slashing in Tatenokai
  - His nickname was "Chibi-Koga", to distinguish him from Koga (古賀), whose surname has the same pronunciation. Further, he was short in height, and the kanji character "small", "little" (小, ko) in "koga" (小賀), so, by extension "tiny", "shorty" (チビ, chibi).
  - Chibi-Koga was born in Arida-shi, Wakayama Prefecture and lost his father due to illness at a young age. His mother was a follower of Seicho-no-Ie, a new religion, so he also began attending training sessions for the religion and becoming a follower of it when he was in junior high school.
- Hiroyasu Koga, Kanagawa University
  - Born: August 15, 1947 –
  - 2nd generation member, the vice leader of 5th team
  - His nickname was "Furu-Koga". The kanji character "old" (古, ko) in "koga" (古賀) can also be read as "furu i" (古い) in kun'yomi.
  - Furu-Koga was born in Takigawa-shi, Hokkaido, and his father, a former elementary school principal, was a lecturer at Seicho-no-Ie headquarters, so he started participating in training sessions and becoming a believer in the religion in high school.
- Masahiro Ogawa (小川正洋), Meiji Gakuin University
  - Born: May 15, 1948 – Died: November 26, 2018
  - 3rd generation member, the leader of 7th team
  - a "Kesshi-tai" member capable of slashing in Tatenokai
  - He was tall and had a small moustache.
  - Ogawa was born in Sanbu-gun, Chiba Prefecture, and grew up with a father who was a former police officer and a mother who was a former teacher, as a boy interested in the Emperor and Japanese history. Ogawa was usually quiet boy, but had an inner fortitude, and was a member of the cheerleading squad (応援団, Ōendan) at high school and university.

== Inspired Events ==
On 3 March 1977, four Japanese nationalists took 12 hostages at the Keidanren Kaikan (headquarters of the Japan Federation of Economic Organizations), spreading leaflets at the scene that denounced big business. The hostages were released, unharmed, after an eleven-hour standoff during which the hostage-takers spoke for more than three hours to Mishima's widow, Yōko. Two of the hostage-takers – Yoshio Itō (伊藤好雄) and Shunichi Nishio (西尾俊一) – were former members of the Tatenokai. This incident is called the "Japan Business Federation attack incident" (経団連襲撃事件, Keidanren shugeki jiken) in Japan.

== Notable members other than those involved in the Mishima Incident ==
- Hiroshi Mochimaru (持丸博), The first Student leader, Waseda University
  - Born: 1943 – Died: September 24, 2013
  - 1st generation member, the leader of 2nd team
  - a "Kesshi-tai" member capable of slashing in Tatenokai
  - Mochimaru was born in Mito-shi, Ibaraki Prefecture.
  - He was Mishima's right-hand man, but left the group in the summer of 1969 to marry Yoshiko Matsuura (松浦芳子), a secretary staff at the Tatenokai, and find employment. After he got married, his surname became his wife's, "Matsuura."
- Tsutomu Abe (阿部勉), Waseda University
  - Born: August 30, 1946 – Died: October 11, 1999
  - 1st generation member, the leader of 5th team
  - the leader of 10th team "Constitutional Amendment Draft Study Group" (憲法改正草案研究会, Kenpō kaisei souan kenkyu-kai)
  - Abe was born in Senboku-gun, Akita Prefecture.
  - In 1972, after the Mishima Incident, he founded an ethnic nationalist group called Issuikai (meaning to hold regular meetings on the first Wednesday of every month).
- Kiyoshi Kuramochi (倉持清), Waseda University
  - Born: May 14, 1947 –
  - 1st generation member, the leader of 2nd team
  - a "Kesshi-tai" member capable of slashing in Tatenokai
  - Kuramochi was born in Ibaraki Prefecture.
  - Like Morita, Kuramochi was a candidate for student leader after Hiroshi Mochimaru left the Tatenokai. Mishima had been asked by Kuramochi, who was planning to marry, to act as a matchmaker, so he did not make Kuramochi a participant in the incident and left a will writing this to him. After he got married, his surname became his wife's, "Honda."

== See also ==
- Issuikai (一水会)

== Sources ==
- Mishima, Yukio (2003). 決定版 三島由紀夫全集 第35巻 評論10 [Definitive Edition Yukio Mishima Complete Works No.35 – Criticisms 10] (in Japanese). Shinchosha. ISBN 978-4-10-642575-2.
- Mishima, Yukio (2003). 決定版 三島由紀夫全集 第36巻 評論11 [Definitive Edition Yukio Mishima Complete Works No.36 – Criticisms 11] (in Japanese). Shinchosha. ISBN 978-4-10-642576-9.
- Satō, Hideaki; Inoue, Takashi; Yamanaka, Takeshi, eds. (2005). 決定版 三島由紀夫全集 第42巻 年譜・書誌 [Definitive Edition Yukio Mishima Complete Works No.42 – Biographical Sketch and Bibliography] (in Japanese). Shinchosha. ISBN 978-4-10-642582-0.
- Andō, Takeshi (1998). 三島由紀夫の生涯 [The Life of Yukio Mishima] (in Japanese). Natsume Shobo. ISBN 978-4-931391-39-0.
- Date, Munekatsu (1972). 裁判記録「三島由紀夫事件」 [Judicial Record of the "Mishima Incident"] (in Japanese). Kodansha. NCID BN0140450X.
- Fukushima, Jurō (2005) [1st pub. Shinjinbutu Ōraisha:1975]. 再訂資料・三島由紀夫 [Re-Edition Document - Yukio Mishima] (in Japanese) (Enlarged ed.). Chobunsha. ISBN 978-4-88695-180-9.
- Hasegawa, Izumi; Takeda, Katsuhiko, eds. (1976). 三島由紀夫事典 [Encyclopedia of Yukio Mishima] (in Japanese). Meiji Shoin. ISBN 978-4-625-40025-4. NCID BN01686605.
- Hiraoka, Azusa (1996) [1st pub. 1972]. 伜・三島由紀夫 [My Son – Yukio Mishima]. Bunshu Bunko (in Japanese) (Paperback ed.). Bungeishunjū. ISBN 978-4-16-716204-7.
- Hosaka, Masayasu (2001) [1st pub. Kodansha:1980]. 三島由紀夫と楯の会事件 [Yukio Mishima and the Tatenokai Incident]. Kadokawa Bunko (in Japanese) (Enlarged/Revised ed.). Kadokawa Shoten. ISBN 978-4-04-355602-1.
- Inuzuka, Kiyoshi (2020). 三島由紀夫と死んだ男―森田必勝の生涯 [The Man who Died with Yukio Mishima: The Life of Masakatsu Morita] (in Japanese). Shumei University Shuppan-kai. ISBN 978-4-915855-40-5.
- 万葉集 [Man'yōshū]. Kadokawa Sophia Bunko – Beginner's Classics (in Japanese). Kadokawa Shoten. 2001. ISBN 978-4-04-357406-3.
- Matsumoto, Tōru; Satō, Hideaki; Inoue, Takashi, eds. (2000). 三島由紀夫事典 [Encyclopedia of Yukio Mishima] (in Japanese). Bensei Shuppan. ISBN 978-4-585-06018-5.
- Murakami, Takeo (2010). 君たちには分からない―「楯の會」で見た三島由紀夫 [You Guys don't Understand: Yukio Mishima that I Saw in "Tatenokai"] (in Japanese). Shinchosha. ISBN 978-4-10-327851-1.
- Murata, Haruki (2015). 三島由紀夫が生きた時代―楯の会と森田必勝 [The Period when Yukio Mishima was Alive: The Tatenokai and Masakatsu Morita] (in Japanese). Seirindo. ISBN 978-4-7926-0532-2.
- Nakamura, Akihiko (2015) [1st pub. Bungeishunjū:2000]. 三島事件 もう一人の主役―烈士と呼ばれた森田必勝 [Another Protagonist of the Mishima Incident: Masakatsu Morita who Called an Upright Man] (in Japanese) (Enlarged ed.). WAC inc. ISBN 978-4-89831-729-7.
- Nathan, John (1975) [1st pub. Little, Brown and Company:1974]. Mishima: A Biography. Tut books. North Clarendon, Vermont: Tuttle Publishing. ISBN 978-4805304020.
  - Nathan, John (2000). Mishima: A Biography (New ed.). Boston, Massachusetts: Da Capo Press. ISBN 978-0-306-80977-4.
- Nathan, John (2000) [1st pub. 1976 (an out-of-print book)]. 新版 三島由紀夫─ある評伝 [New Edition – Mishima: A Biography] (in Japanese). Translated by Noguchi, Takehiko (New/Revised ed.). Shinchosha. ISBN 978-4-10-505702-2.
- Nishi, Hōtaro (2020). 三島由紀夫事件 50年目の証言―警察と自衛隊は何を知っていたか [Yukio Mishima Incident – Testimonies of 50 Years Later: What did the Police and the Self-Defense Forces Know] (in Japanese). Shinchosha. ISBN 978-4-10-353581-2.
- Satake, Akihiro; Yamada, Hideo, eds. (2015). 万葉集（五） [Man'yōshū (5)]. Iwanami Bunko (in Japanese). Iwanami Shoten. ISBN 978-4-00-300058-8.
- Shinohara, Yutaka (2017). 三島由紀夫かく語りき [Yukio Mishima Spoke Thus] (in Japanese). Tendensha. ISBN 978-4-88656-435-1.
- Suzuki, Ayumi; Tamura, Tsukasa, eds. (2015). 火群のゆくへ―元楯の会会員たちの心の軌跡 [Whereabouts of the Flames: The Trajectories of Their Hearts who once Belonged to the Tatenokai] (in Japanese). Hakurosha. ISBN 978-4-434-07066-2.
- Yamadaira, Shigeki (2004). 最後の浪人 阿部勉伝―酒抱きてけふも堕ちなん [A Biography of The Last Rōnin, Tsutomu Abe: With a Sake Bottle in His Arms, He will Fall Again Today] (in Japanese). J's Keibunsha. ISBN 978-4-905848-50-9.
- 新潮 臨時増刊 三島由紀夫 没後三十年 [Shinchō – Extra Special Issue: Yukio Mishima 30 Years After His Death] (in Japanese). Shinchosha. 2000. ASIN B007GZUN4K. NCID BA49508943.
- Antonio Picarazzi, Yukio Mishima: Youth, Beauty, Death between Myth and Illusion, 2025, KDP Amazon, ISBN 979-8275178937
