= Minzoku-ha =

Japanese political faction

Minzoku-ha (民族派, lit. "ethnic nationalist groups") or New Right (新右翼, shin-uyoku) is a Japanese ethno-nationalist faction that emerged after postwar Japan.

== Content ==
Minzoku-ha are known to be more anti-American (反米保守, lit. "anti-American conservative") than mainstream conservatives or Japanese nationalists. It originated among the student agitations of the 1960s and 1970s, many of whom were followers of Yukio Mishima.

In postwar Japan, mainstream conservatives prioritized "anti-communism" (反共主義) over Japanese "ethnic nationalism" (民族主義) in the context of the Cold War; however, minzoku-ha was critical of the pro-Americanism of mainstream conservatives. Minzoku-ha grew up influenced by Yukio Mishima's nationalism and the Japanese New Left.

== Minzoku-ha groups ==
- Daitō juku (大東塾)
- Ichisuikai (一水会)
- Tatenokai
- Japan First Party

== Activists ==
- Chiren Misawa (見沢知廉)
- Yukio Mishima
- Shūsuke Nomura

== See also ==
- Anti-Americanism#Japan
- Ethnic nationalism in Japan
- Pan-Asianism
- Young minzoku-ha (青年民族派)
- Uyoku dantai
- Yamato nationalism
