= Shūsuke Nomura =

Japanese activist (1935–1993)

Shūsuke Nomura (野村 秋介, 14 February 1935 – 20 October 1993) was a Japanese ethno-nationalist (民族派) activist. He is best remembered for his assault and suicide in the offices of the newspaper Asahi Shimbun.

== Life and career ==
In 1963 Nomura burned down the home of politician Ichirō Kōno, for which he served 12 years in prison. On 3 March 1977, in what came to be known as the Keidanren incident, he and three others entered the Japan Federation of Economic Organizations headquarters with pistols, hunting rifles and Japanese swords, initially taking 12 staff members hostage and confining them in the chairman's office for about 11 hours. The four called themselves the "Youth Alliance to Overthrow the YP [Yalta-Potsdam] System" and had the stated goal of "throwing a hammer against the deception of the post- war system". After Yoko Sugiyama (Yukio Mishima's wife) decided to intervene by imploring them to release the hostages, the group gave in to her demand, due to the respect they had for Mishima. Nomura then served another 6 years in prison. He continued to maintain that circumstances sometimes justified such violence.

Nomura and his Kaze no Kai (風の会, "Wind Party") ran in the 1992 Upper House election. The party was behind in the polls when the Asahi Shimbun published a cartoon in its weekly magazine in which the character for "lice" (虱) replaced the character for "wind" (風) in "Kaze no Tō". In reaction, Nomura entered the offices of Asahi dressed in a kimono, proclaimed "Asahi to sashi-chigaeru" (「朝日と刺し違える」, "Asahi and I will die upon each other's swords"), and bowed in the direction of the Imperial Palace. He then shot himself with two pistols and died shortly after in the hospital. Media criticized Nomura's act as an attack on freedom of the press.

== Legacy ==
In October 2013 NHK board member Michiko Hasegawa distributed an essay at a memorial for Nomura in which she said that Emperor Akihito became a "living god" again when Nomura shot himself, "whatever [the postwar] Constitution might say". Before Japan's loss in World War II, Japanese emperors had been deified, but the postwar constitution demoted the emperor to a symbolic, human role.
