= Raiō no Terasu =

1969 play by Yukio Mishima

- Original title: 癩王のテラス
- Original language: Japanese
- Written by: Yukio Mishima
- Music by: Alan Hovhaness

Premiere
- Date: July 4, 1969; 57 years ago
- Place: Teikoku Gekijō

Raiō no Terasu (癩王のテラス; The Terrace of the Leper King) is a 1969 play written by Yukio Mishima.

It is a depiction of Jayavarman VII's legendary construction of the Bayon set against a backdrop of the rapidly declining Khmer Empire. It is notable for being Mishima's last original work aside from The Sea of Fertility, and strongly manifests his characteristic themes.

== Summary ==
The script for Raiō no Terasu first appeared in the July 1969 issue of the literary magazine Umi (海) and was published in book form by Chūōkōronsha on June 28 of the same year. A paperback edition was published by Chūkō Bunko on August 10, 1975, but was banned from publication and went out of print. A Japanese-language edition is currently only available in a complete compilation of Mishima's works published in 2002 by Shinchōsha. Satō Hiroaki translated Raiō no Terasu into English as The Terrace of the Leper King in 2002.

For the first performance in 1969, the lead character of Jayavarman VII was played by Kitaōji Kin'ya. In 2016, Miyamoto Amon directed a performance of Raiō no Terasu cast by Phare Circus.

== Characters ==
- Jayavarman VII
- Cudamani, mother of Jayavarman VII
- Indradevi, first queen
- Rajendradevi, second queen
- Suryabhatta, prime minister
- Keo-Fa, mason and later head builder
- Khnum, young woman of the village and later wife of Keo-Fa
- Liu Mafu (劉 万福), ambassador from the Southern Song dynasty
- Wife of Liu Mafu
- Kansa, original head builder
- Naray, painter
- Paron, tile-maker
- Pandan, bas-relief carver
- Sa-Uy, gilder
- Kralapanji, astrologer
- Thayak, exorcist

== See also ==
- Terrace of the Leper King
- Devaraja
