= Tachibana Akemi =

Japanese writer

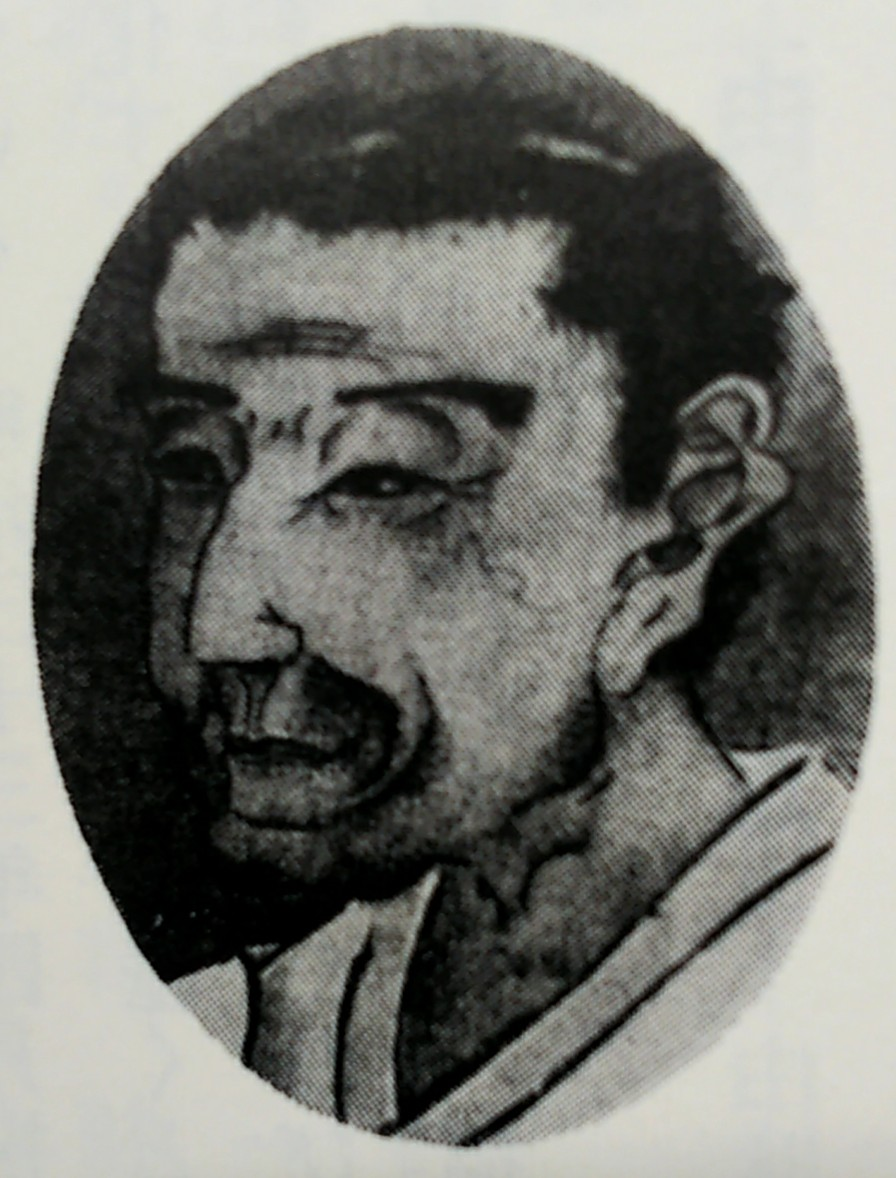
A drawing of Tachibana Akemi

Tachibana Akemi (橘 曙覧; 1812 – October 13, 1868) was a Japanese poet and scholar of kokugaku.

== Early life ==
Tachibana was born in Echizen (now part of Fukui Prefecture). His parents died when he was a child. He studied to become a Nichiren priest for a time, but abandoned that and considered other career paths. He returned to his hometown of Echizen. After the birth of his first son in 1846, he turned the family business over to his half-brother and became a recluse, devoting his time to the study and composition of waka.

== Poetry career ==
Tachibana broke from tradition by writing poems about whatever he was contemplating at the time, including household minutia, industrial activity, and even nationalism, rather than limiting himself to nature scenes and romantic themes. He lived in voluntary poverty but that environment inspired "some of his most endearing poems, those describing the little pleasures of a poor scholar's life."

During his life Tachibana's poetry was only known in the Echizen region, but an 1899 newspaper article by Masaoka Shiki called national attention to his work.

== Works ==
- Dokurakugin (独楽吟 "Reciting Poetry for My Own Pleasure"), collection of 52 poems.

American mathematician and philosopher, Raymond M. Smullyan refers to Tachibana's poem "Solitary Pleasures," in his book Who Knows?: A Study of Religious Consciousness. Unfortunately, Smullyan misspelled his name as Tachibama Akemi.

In 1994, one of poems from the above work was quoted by the President of the United States Bill Clinton in his remarks at a ceremony for Emperor Akihito and Empress Michiko of Japan.
