= Views on the meaning of Mishima's death =

Interpretations of Yukio Mishima's suicide

This article, Views on the meaning of Mishima's death, introduces various perspectives and interpretations regarding Yukio Mishima's suicide on November 25, 1970 during the Mishima Incident.

Interpretations for his death include that it was an aesthetic suicide for the artist's sake, or that he was politically serious, and while many knowledgeable persons are eager to share their opinions about the mystery of his death, some of his fellow literary figures and left-wing intellectuals at the time remained silent and said nothing, or even chose to ignore the incident, feeling guilty for not taking any action themselves.

After the end of the Shōwa era, following the collapse of the Cold War and the bursting of the asset price bubble in the early 1990s, Mishima's prophetic words, which seemed to anticipate a period of emptiness in Japan, had ironically begun to be felt as reality in Japanese society, where it had become difficult to base one's identity on the economy anymore. Furthermore, Mishima's feelings toward Emperor Shōwa, which initially received little in-depth consideration, had also begun to be discussed, and detailed interpretations of his work "Voices of the Fallen Heroes" and its connection to the February 26 Incident have emerged. There had also been a growing trend to examine the relationship between Mishima's works and his actions in terms of his upbringing and the trauma of not being able to die during the war.

More than 40 years have passed since the incident, and the initial reactions of dismissing it as an "act of madness" have largely disappeared. Instead, views that seek to understand Mishima's resentment toward the era and society that drove him to his actions, and the political message he left behind, had become mainstream. Furthermore, more than 50 years later, a wide variety of research into Mishima continues, including new views that see his actions as his "ultimate literary work" making an attempt to create a new myth, based on the connection to the Japanese mythology and the long history, as seen in the Kojiki and other myths, from the episode that Mishima said, "Japan must revive the new Tenson kōrin."

== Views on factors that led to his suicide ==
=== Criticism of the postwar system / Death by remonstrance ===
Mishima left behind many criticisms and lectures criticizing the Constitution created by GHQ after the war, and the postwar democracy (戦後民主主義), which had led to the decline Japanese spirit, as well as and warnings about the ambiguity of the JSDF' mission under the Japan-US Security Treaty system. For this reason, many his friends, writers and researchers have interpreted the meaning of Mishima's death, as a committing "suicide of remonstrance" (諌死, kanshi), or as a "death of indignation" (憤死, funshi) that expressed disappointment, anger, despair and criticism toward the politicians who disregard the national polity and are preoccupied with party interests and self-preservation, and the postwar intellectuals who belittled traditional Japanese culture.

Takao Sugiyama (杉山隆男), a non-fiction writer, referring to Mishima's comment in an essay he contributed to "Takigahara", the organizational newspaper of the JGSDF Camp Takigahara, that "having become a man who 'knows too much' about the JSDF", and Sugiyama has taken notice, "Indeed, Mishima had become a man who 'knew too much', and as he wrote in his Geki, he was able to foresee the true nature of the JSDF, 'It is patently obvious that the U.S. would not be glad to see a truly independent Japanese military defending Japanese land.'," and he has mentioned about Mishima's despair, combining it to Sugiyama own view of the JSDF that he experienced as follows:

No matter how hard, steady and single-minded, like stacking pebbles up, each and every JSDF personnel works on the front lines of training and missions, the nature and limitations of the JSDF that created by the U.S. and still has the U.S. as its guardian and is obliged to listen to its will, as a political tool, which was not change even as the twenty years since the end of the war, have turned into sixty years and a new century has begun. (Omitted) What I had to realize for fifteen years and was forced to convince myself that it was true after all, Mishima saw with his sharp and penetrating gaze during his less than four years of experience in the JSDF. The things that must be the most Japanese are, at their core, impossible to become Japanese, due to the distortions of post-war Japan. Wasn't Mishima's despair emanating from that?

— Takao Sugiyama, Yukio Mishima who could not become a "Soldier"

Takashi Inoue (井上隆史), a literary critic and Mishima researcher has argued that Mishima's death cannot be limited to a death for the sake of literature, but was also a death of criticism, namely, "death of remonstration" against the hollowing out of the cultural identity of the Japanese, which had reached a point of no return. Inoue has mentioned that Mishima thought that the last year in which his act of death could have meaning in the history of the community in Japan was 1970, the year the Security Treaty (Anpo) was automatically extended, and Japan's spiritual hollowing out would become truly irreversible after this year.However, he has interpreted that, at the time of November 1970, the Japanese may have already lost the of ability to understand the spiritual meaning of his death, which may have been a miscalculation of Mishima, who believed there was still time for the Japanese make a recovery.

It can be seen from Mishima's works and essays that his criticism of the postwar system also included resentment toward Emperor Shōwa Hirohito, who had made the Humanity Declaration. And it is said that Mishima's final cry of "Long live the Emperor!" (天皇陛下万歳, Tennō heika banzai) was a cheer for the "Emperor of Sollen (ゾルレン(当為), Zoruren)" that was his ideal, and some researchers has interpreted it as representing the final voices of soldiers on the battlefield, spoken for them who died for the Emperor.

Regarding Mishima's view of the Emperor, Fusao Hayashi has interpreted that Mishima's aspiration was not to revive the Emperor as a political concept, or in other words, to restore the Meiji Constitution, but to revive and establish the Emperor as the unifier of Japanese culture as the only philosophy that could oppose totalitarianism of both the left and right, that communism and fascism. Donald Keene has interpreted that Mishima's Emperor worship was not simple fanaticism, but an expression of faith in an ideal that transcends reality. And he has explained that Mishima preached the infallibility of the Emperor, but that does not mean the Emperor's personal human abilities were flawless, that what the Emperor Mishima called was the embodiment of Japanese tradition in human form with divine status and the one and only treasure trove, in which the experiences of the Japanese ethnicity have been stored, and that for Mishima, protecting the Emperor was the same as protecting Japan itself. Also Keene has mentioned that Mishima's love for Japanese traditions developed into the unchanging element in his aesthetics.

=== Dislike of ugly old age ===
And, there have been many studies into Mishima's suicide from the perspective of his aesthetic sense, and as he himself wrote in his essays, during his adolescence, he admired the premature mortality of Raymond Radiguet, and some have speculated that he was avoiding old age, given that he depicted ugly old characters in his works, for example Shigekuni Honda (本多繁邦), the secondary protagonist of The Sea of Fertility tetralogy, in which particular depicted in The Temple of Dawn, the third novel and The Decay of the Angel, the fourth novel.

According to Kikue Kojima (小島喜久江) (Note: After becoming independent, Kikue Kojima used the pen name Chikako Kojima.) who was Mishima's editor at Shinchosha, while writing The Sea of Fertility tetralogy, Mishima once said, "Growing old is ridiculous; I can't forgive it," and "I can never forgive myself for getting old." However, Mishima's thoughts on aging were not always one-sided, also he once told Kojima that "Yasunari Kawabata and Sato Haruo are good examples of people whose spiritual beauty begins to emerge as they age." Mishima also said on the a radio program that in his old age he wanted to write pure mystery and that he wanted to die on tatami mats.

According to Takeo Murakami (村上建夫), a 3rd generation member of the Tatenokai who joined in March 1969, during a casual conversation with him who a new student member, Mishima said that the name "Yukio" (由紀夫) in kanji was too young for a pen name, and that when he grew old, he planned to change it to "Yukio" (雪翁) (okina (翁) means old man) inspired by "Saō" (沙翁) that is kanji reading Shakespeare (沙吉比亜)'s honorific. When the Murakami asked in surprise, "What, aren't you going to die young, Sensei?" Mishima's expression turned into sour as if he had bitten something bitter and he turned away. From this, Murakami has considered that Mishima had intended to live a long life in real outside of his novels at around March 1969.

On the other hand, according to Sadako Toyoda (豊田貞子), Mishima's girlfriend when he was in his 30s, he told her, "I feel like when I get old, I'll become a cranky, lonely old man like Kafū Nagai, and I absolutely hate that. That's why I don't want to live past 50," and "Honey, you are 10 years younger than me, so when I die, I want you to lay my favorite yellow roses." (Note: Incidentally, Kafū Nagai was a distant relative of Mishima.) (Note: Although Sadako Toyoda (whose married name was Sadako Gotō (後藤貞子)) did not attend Mishima's funeral, she sent a bouquet of yellow roses to Mishima's mother, Shizue, and continued to send yellow roses at every Buddhist memorial service or the anniversary of Mishima's death.) According to Kazuki Kasuya (粕谷一希), who was the editor-in-chief of the monthly magazine Chūō Kōron, Mishima said to him, "Can you imagine me becoming an old man like Kafū Nagai?", and he also said, "No matter how much self-sacrifice a writer makes, people around the world will still see it as self-expression."

=== Longing for heroic martyrdom ===
It is easy to see from many of his essays and works that "dying beautifully" was Mishima's ideal, and he also mentioned that in an essay Beautiful Death (美しい死, Utsukushii Shi) after he enlisted in the JSDF for the first time on his solo trial period.

The ideal of the ancient Greeks was to live and die beautifully, and the ideal of our Bushidō must have been found there as well. (Omitted)
Without the "Martial (武, Bu)" mindset, a person can consider himself weak as much as he likes, can self-vindication any cowardly or ungraceful behavior, and can give in to any demand. In exchange, his personal safety would be guaranteed in the end. But once one has resolved to become a martial artist, his personal safety is no longer guaranteed. Because cowardly or ungraceful behavior is no longer tolerated, even towards oneself, and when the stakes are high, the only options are to fight to the death or commit suicide. However, it is only then that a person can die beautifully and complete their life, which shows that human beings are truly made of irony.

— Yukio Mishima, Beautiful Death

Furthermore, at the beginning of 1967, just before turning 42, Mishima wrote an essay saying, "Saigō Takamori died a hero at the age of 50, and when I went to Kumamoto recently to research the Shinpūren rebellion, I was moved to discover that Kaya Harukata, one of the leaders of that rebellion which at first glance is often seen as the violent act of a young man and who met a heroic end, died the same age as me now. If I do it now, I will be in time to reach the final age at which worthy as a hero." It is considered essential for Mishima, heroes were the object whose existence was impossible in the modern postwar era in which he lived, and at the same time, they were the object whose reinstatement he himself should attempt.

Ivan Morris has looked that the people in Japanese history that Mishima most admired were "Tragic heroes" such as Kusunoki Masashige, Ōshio Heihachirō, and the Samurais of the Shinpūren rebellion, who dared to fight in battles they could not win and who, despite their courage and determination, were ultimately defeated, and he has interpreted that Mishima considered himself to belong to the old Japanese tradition of the "Tragic hero," and hoped to become one as well.

In his Confessions of a Mask, Mishima self-analyzes and confesses that from an early age he was attracted to beautiful and strong young men who was "risking their lives" at hard labor, picture books about murdered princes, and tragic soldiers, and that he had a strong desire to become one of those people. In the essay Sun and Steel, written around the time when Mishima had gained physical confidence and was undergoing rigorous training as part of a group during his trial enlistment in the JSDF, he also wrote about his sense of "risking my life" for "something tragic" and he wrote that what he missed out as a young man during the war, lacking physical ability, was the "tragedy of collective." From this perspective, quite a few researchers have seen Mishima's suicide, which actually resulted in his tragic death after "risking his life" for a just cause, as being connected to and a recursion of a fatalistic desire from his childhood.

=== Desire to commit seppuku ===
Just as Mishima wrote in Confessions of a Mask that he was deeply attracted to the masochistic martyr's death in Guido Reni's painting Saint Sebastian, which he first saw at the age of 13, his tendency to find beauty in a spectacular and horrific way to die can also be seen from his fondness for Hiroshi Hirata's historical gekiga as well as Oscar Wilde's play Salome which Mishima adapted in 1960, and it has often been mentioned that his sensual taste for and obsession with seppuku can be seen in his work Patriotism, a film Patriotism he starred in, and his homosexual-themed short story Love's Penance (愛の処刑, Ai no shokei).

According to Hiromichi Nakayasu (中康弘通), a seppuku researcher who had spoken about seppuku with Mishima before he wrote Patriotism, has explained that the desire to commit seppuku is unique to the Japanese, and that it stems much more from narcissism than from masochism, and that people who are interested in seppuku, regardless of gender, "have their spiritual tradition of seppuku, that is, the ritual solemnity and the tragic beauty of sublime self-sacrifice, imprinted on their adolescent minds, and have grasped the significance of seppuku as a medium that connects the two poles of love and death, like a conditioned reflex." He also has explained "although, even among such people, while some choose seppuku as a way to commit suicide, no one commits suicide because they want to commit seppuku".

Incidentally, at one time, there were speculations and rumors that it was a "homosexual double suicide" (lovers suicide) between Mishima and Morita, regarding those speculations, John Nathan has interpreted that while Mishima must have felt sexually attracted to Morita, Morita did not have any such complicated feelings and was simply thinking about dying as a patriotic soldier. (Note: Not long since after the incident, there were speculations and rumors that it was a "homosexual double suicide" between Mishima and Morita, and the police received inquiries from reporters of weekly magazines asking whether there were any autopsy findings that would indicate homosexuality, but the police chief denied it with a wry smile, saying that there were absolutely no such traces. As it was originally planned for all five of them to commit suicide together, and it became clear that Morita had met a girl the night before the incident, and Mishima had tried to stop Morita's suicide until the very end, so in recent years, this theory of a "homosexual double suicide" has not been treated as a decent view.) Kunio Suzuki (鈴木邦男) of Issuikai, who was on friendly terms with Morita and other Tatenokai members and knew Morita's character well, also has said that if Mishima had forced a homosexual relationship on Morita or any of his fellow members, the Tatenokai would have fallen apart.

=== Influence of his mentor, Zenmei Hasuda ===
Additionally, many researchers have mentioned that one of the factors that led to Mishima's suicide was the influence of Zenmei Hasuda, Mishima's literary mentor from his boyhood and one of his spiritual pillars, who committed suicide with a pistol after Japan's defeat in the war, wishing to preserve the national polity. Hasuda was so enraged that his superior, a colonel, at a ceremony to farewell the military flag, blamed the Emperor for the defeat, slandered the future of the Imperial Army, and spoke of the destruction of the Japanese spirit that he shot the colonel to death and then committed suicide himself. Upon learning of Hasuda's tragic death following year, Mishima composed a poem of condolence for him as follows:

古代の雲を愛でし 君はその身に古代を現じて雲隠れ玉ひしに われ近代に遺されて空しく 靉靆の雲を慕ひ その身は漠々たる 塵土に埋れんとす

(Kodai no kumo wo medeshi Kimi wa sono mini kodai wo genjite kumogakure tamaishini Ware kindai ni nokosarete munashiku Aitai no kumo wo shitai Sono mi wa bakubaku taru Jindo ni umorentosu)

You, who loved the clouds of ancient times, / have revealed that ancient time to yourself, and passed away yourself in the clouds like a jewel, / while I, left behind in modern times, / yearn in vain for the gloomy clouds / and my body is about to be buried in the vast dusty earth of temporal world. — Yukio Mishima, Untitled (A poem dedicated to the late Zenmei Hasuda)

Yukito Yamauchi (山内由紀人), a Mishima researcher, has mentioned that the latter half of the poem shows Mishima's feelings of spineless for himself at having accepted the military doctor's misdiagnosis and not being able to following on from Hasuda gone to the front line, and his feelings of guilt at having betrayed his mentor Zenmei Hasuda's expectations of him. Yamauchi has considered that Mishima's feelings of guilt developed into an issue of sincerity in living life, and that his anguish at having survived after the war and his guilt at having betrayed Hasuda's expectations eventually became remorse, proceeding into "nostalgia" for his teenage years and a "heimkehr" (return home) for romanticism, and he has interpreted that the meaning of "Promise" in Mishima's essay Promise that I haven't been Fulfilled: 25 years in me (果たし得てゐない約束―私の中の二十五年, Hatashi ete inai Yakusoku: Watashi no naka no 25 nen), written four months before his suicide, refers to an "implicit agreement" with Hasuda, who was saying, "I think one should die young in this age... And, I know that to die is today's culture of mine." in his essay Poetry of Youth: A Study of Prince Ōtsu.

Yamauchi also has mentioned that in Dialogue: Theory about the Japanese (a dialogue with Fusao Hayashi), Mishima saying, "The only formality of criticism to the highest authority in the Japanese is death," and "there is only death as a formality of criticism" for "criticize the absolute," and has looked at that Mishima's death was a "romantic return at the risk of his life," considering that the death of Hasuda, whom Mishima respected, was also a form of criticism, touching upon a prophetic passage in Mishima's debut work, The Forest in Full Bloom (花ざかりの森, Hanazakari no Mori), which seems to foreshadow his inner psychological state in his final years.

Chiseko Tanaka (田中千世子), a film director, has speculated that Mishima at the end of his life, may have been trying to return to the person he was in his 20s, in which he called out to the spirit of the late Zenmei Hasuda, saying, "You, who loved the clouds of ancient times," and lamented, "and my body is about to be buried in the vast dusty earth of temporal world." Keiji Shimauchi (島内景二), a doctor of classical literature, has analyzed that the origins of Mishima's literature has being in the spiritual world of Japan Romantic School (日本浪曼派, Nihon Rōman-ha), which was believed in by Zenmei Hasuda, who embodied the ancient spirit, and that Mishima's ardent wish was to revive that ancient spirit in the modern era, which Mishima believed would lead to a renaissance of Japanese culture into contemporary Japan.

=== Feelings of guilt for surviving after the war ===
Also, during the Pacific War, Mishima barely passed the conscription examination, but on the day of his enlistment, he was misdiagnosed with tuberculosis during a physical examination due to a high fever caused by bronchitis, and was sent home the same day. (Note: After returning home, it was discovered after he underwent a re-examination at a hospital in Tokyo that "tuberculosis" was a misdiagnosis through examination by a famous doctor.) In Confessions of a Mask, Mishima confessed his ambivalent feelings about that time, as he prepared himself to die in the war, but went along with the doctor's questions and gave an exaggerated report of his condition, and asking himself questions over and over again about on the attitude of passivity due to his physical frailty. Many researchers have interpreted that the sense of guilt and complex he felt at that time lingered after the war, were an indirect cause of his behavior in his later years. According to Katsuo Kikuchi, a JSDF officer who became close friends with Mishima, when the topic turned to wartime, Mishima told him, "I was weak both physically and mentally," and confessed that "I felt inferiority complex" about had not being able to have the courage to volunteer for the battlefield.

Although Mishima admired the Kamikaze, his timidity, brought on by his physical frailty, run counter to his sense of longing, and it has seen as the feeling that he was being "rejected" from the "actions" became a lifelong theme for him. This can be seen in his own essays and works, and many researchers have mentioned that the post-war period marked a turning point for Mishima, when he came to feel that this was his survivor's guilt. (Note: In his final dialogue with Takashi Furubayashi, Mishima had described the postwar period as his "remnant life.") Also, it has pointed out that Mishima was never able to escape the complex and feeling of alienation about not becoming a soldier during the war, in his lifetime.

Mitsuru Yoshida, a writer who was of the same wartime generation as Mishima and was a friend of him, has stated that the basics of the issues that Mishima attempted to tackle throughout his life was germinated from the fact that "he had be late for death at the war," and has expressed the view that "by choosing death, Mishima hoped to be given the same place as his comrades who died in the war." Then after mentioned about the spirituality and calmness of introspection shared by Mishima, who was 20 years old at the end of the war, and Iwao Usubuchi (臼淵磐), who was killed at the age of 21 while participating in a Special Attack Units on the battleship Yamato, and Tadao Hayashi (林尹夫), who died in combat with a US naval aircraft in the skies off the coast of Shikoku, Yoshida has mentioned:

Some of his predecessors and comrades in the Japan Romantic School must have left Mishima with words of entrusting national future to him. For a young man in the midst of war, being entrusted with national future did not mean something as leisurely as post-war reconstruction, but purely meant that he too would fulfill his duty and sacrifice himself for his country. (Omitted)
We, the wartime generation, are a generation that, at the peak of our youth, were only allowed to pursue the challenge of "how to live" by confronting the difficult question of "how to die." And we are a generation that took on this tribulation with foolish honesty. In Tadao Hayashi's words, "Even if I get beaten and kicked, I will not let go of the kingdom of the spirit. That is the only discipling I have now, and, in there existents what will teach me to way of live a life that can be consistent the past and the future," saying so, we are the generation of foolish honesty who try to whip ourselves. We are the generation that has no knowledge of how to protect ourselves, like the persons simply portrayed themselves as one-sided victims of the war, severing ties with it, and hastily returning to where one belongs, when the war ended. Mishima himself was a man of integrity and seriousness, who could not tolerate compromise.

— Mitsuru Yoshida, The suffering of Yukio Mishima

Hiromichi Nakayasu, a seppuku researcher who was born in the same year as Mishima in 1925, has touched that the Manchurian Incident began the year he started elementary school, and that for a generation that grew up in an era when war was commonplace, death was inevitable and the question of "how I should die" was the main issue. He himself felt that after the war, he survived and felt guilty for being late in dying, and this feeling deepened with each news of the deaths of his friends in battle, they seeming like immortal elites in his mind, and that from that experience, he inferred also carried the scars of Mishima's youth in his heart for a long time. And Nakayasu has considered that just like himself sought aesthetics in the classics and the reverence for the Emperor of times of turmoil medieval era, and devoted himself to the study of seppuku, Mishima, while expanding Japan's presence in the world and devoting himself to Japanese literature, also sought Japan within himself, the way of dying as a Japanese, became a theme of his way of life. And he has explained that seppuku is – "a ceremony when Japanese people risk their lives to do something," and "the ultimate ceremony for the defeated to compensate for humiliation before they die," – and he also has interpreted that Mishima's seppuku was also an expression of loyalty to the ideal Emperor as Mishima held in his heart, and cleansing of his sins that would continue to live on in the post-war world where sanctity was not seen longer.

Miyoji Ueda (上田三四二) a poet and doctor, has stated that when he saw a newspaper photograph of Mishima's head and Masakatsu Morita's head placed next to each other, his impression was that "I think Mr. Mishima Yukio died like Narcissus," and that Mishima, who had longed for an early death but was unable to die at the age of 20, because of his unsuitable body fit to die, found himself identifying with "that young companion," and that he had the impression that "Mr. was rewinding the time that he had lived and entrusting the completion of his own early death to the young man beside him."

The uniform erases individuality and makes me and you, me and all of you the same. What Mishima dreamed of on the line of silent bodies, unlike the mind, was a line of mirrors, identical to himself, and the uniform, especially the warrior's uniform, made this wish possible. A warrior is one who has swallowed death in his stomach, and the uniform is the purifying garment of death, so the line of bodies becomes the alter-ego of Mishima who yearns for tragic destruction, and they share their sufferings. The young warriors are the illusions and mirrors of Mishima, who leads the unit, his own shadow reflected in the "water of rejuvenating" (変若水, ochimizu), and clones created like a mold from the same somatic cells. The young man with the boyish face who shared his fate was placed next to him, and was the most beautiful and polished mirror.

— Miyoji Ueda, Writing Style and his Flesh

== Views on why he acted on "November 25" ==
Regarding the date of November 25, some researchers have speculated that there may be a connection between Hirohito became regent on November 25, 1921, due to Emperor Taisho's serious illness, and 25 years later, Emperor Shōwa, Hirohito made the "Declaration of Humanity" in 1946, the year be turning his "age in completed years" (満年齢, man nenrei) to 45. From those, some researchers have speculated that the meaning of Mishima, who would have been the same age of man nenrei 45 in 1970, committing suicide on November 25, was to the resurrection the "God" by dying as a scapegoat of Emperor Shōwa who had been became a human.

Researchers who advocate this theory have taken into account the fact of Mishima had been sympathizing with Asaichi Isobe, a leader of the February 26 Incident, who was executed while being outraged that Emperor Shōwa did not recognize their high integrity and being decided to become himself as a god, and Mishima had written Voices of the Fallen Heroes, in which included a criticism of the Emperor Shōwa, they have mentioned that Mishima sent a warning to postwar society by taking his own life in his incident at the same time, his act was also a way of "becoming a god" in the place of Emperor Shōwa.

Kenichi Matsumoto (松本健一), who influenced this theory, based his argument on the episode in which literary critic Kōichi Isoda (磯田光一) heard Mishima say, "Truthfully, I want to kill the Emperor Shōwa at the Imperial Palace. Before I commit seppuku," about a month before the incident, and Masahiko Shimada, with whom Isoda talked to about it, said, "I think maybe Yukio Mishima wanted to become Emperor. In other words, he wanted to identify himself with the Emperor.", (Note: Regarding Isoda's statement, Hiroshi Mochimaru has questioned the veracity of it, saying that Mishima, who was a cautious man, would never have said anything to an outsider that hinted at a plan for uprising or his committing seppuku in advance. Gō Itasaka (板坂剛) has considered that there is a high possibility that Isoda's statement was fabricated, and that even if it was Isoda's creation, it is fair to think that Isoda was speaking on behalf of what Mishima should have said, and that if one reads Mishima's works Voices of the Fallen Heroes and The Decline and Fall of The Suzaku (朱雀家の滅亡, Suzaku-ke no Metsubō), there seems to be no problem in recognizing that the words "Truthfully, I want to kill the Emperor Shōwa at the Imperial Palace," were Mishima's true feelings.) that since this was actually impossible to kill, Mishima killed Hirohito in his world of idea, and in real, died himself in Hirohito's place, thus eliminating the Emperor as a post-war's human being, and then gone into the afterlife while holding in his mind the image of his own idealized "Beautiful Emperor."

And, November 25, 1970 (Shōwa 45) of the solar calendar date corresponds to October 27 of the traditional Japanese calendar (lunisolar calendar) (旧暦, kyureki), and the date of October 27 is same date as the execution date of Yoshida Shōin, whom Mishima respected, from that, many writers and researchers have speculated that Mishima chose this date for his suicide day. These writers and researchers have expounded that Yoshida Shōin's death day, October 27, 1859 (Ansei 6) of the lunisolar calendar corresponds to November 21, 1859, of the solar calendar, but Mishima's suicide day, November 25, 1970 (Shōwa 45) corresponds to October 27, 1970, of the lunisolar calendar. (Note: For reference, here is the lunisolar calendar table for November 1970.)

Besides, Naoki Komuro (小室直樹), a sociologist and Mishima researcher, has touched that there is a passage in Mishima's novel Runaway Horses in which Shigekuni Honda considers the possibility that Isao Iinuma was born during the period of bardo following Kiyoaki Matsugae's death. And he has speculated that since Mishima's birthday, January 14, was 49 days (7 x 7) after November 25, Mishima might have set the period of bardo in 49 days of which most easiest to be reincarnated into his next life. Hiroshi Funasaka (舩坂弘), who presented the Japanese sword "Seki Magoroku" to Mishima, also has put forward the same theory.

And, November 25 was the date that Mishima had begun to writing Confessions of a Mask in 1948, and at time of the publication, he had announced this novel meant a "Surgery for Restore Life", "Suicide that Reversed". Mishima also had noted as follows:

This novel is a will for leave in the Realm of Deaths where I used to live. If you take a movie of a suicide jumped, and rotate the film in reverse, the suicide person jumps up from the valley bottom to the top of the cliff at a furious speed and he revives. What I have attempted in writing this novel is to such a Surgery for Restore Life.

— Yukio Mishima, Notes on Confessions of a Mask

Takashi Inoue (井上隆史), a literary critic and Mishima researcher, mentioning that Mishima had written Confessions of a Mask to live in postwar Japan and to get away from his "Realm of Deaths", and has interpreted that by committing suicide on the same date of November 25 that he had begun to write Confessions of a Mask, Mishima intended to dismantle all of his postwar creative activities and return to the "Realm of Deaths" where he used to live.

== See also ==
- Reactions to the Mishima Incident
- Prelude to the Mishima Incident

== Sources ==
- Mishima, Yukio (2003). 決定版 三島由紀夫全集 第27巻 評論2 [Definitive Edition Yukio Mishima Complete Works No.27 – Criticisms 2] (in Japanese). Shinchosha. ISBN 978-4-10-642567-7.
- Mishima, Yukio (2003). 決定版 三島由紀夫全集 第34巻 評論9 [Definitive Edition Yukio Mishima Complete Works No.34 – Criticisms 9] (in Japanese). Shinchosha. ISBN 978-4-10-642574-5.
- Mishima, Yukio (2004). 決定版 三島由紀夫全集 第37巻 詩歌 [Definitive Edition Yukio Mishima Complete Works No.37 – Poetry] (in Japanese). Shinchosha. ISBN 978-4-10-642577-6.
- Mishima, Yukio (2004). 決定版 三島由紀夫全集 第39巻 対談1 [Definitive Edition Yukio Mishima Complete Works No.39 – Dialogues 1] (in Japanese). Shinchosha. ISBN 978-4-10-642579-0.
- Mishima, Yukio (2004). 決定版 三島由紀夫全集 第40巻 対談2 [Definitive Edition Yukio Mishima Complete Works No.40 – Dialogues 2] (in Japanese). Shinchosha. ISBN 978-4-10-642580-6.
- Akiyama, Shun; others (1990). 三島由紀夫 [Yukio Mishima]. Gunzo – Japanese Authors 18 (in Japanese). Shogakukan. ISBN 978-4-09-567018-8.
- Andō, Takeshi (1996). 三島由紀夫「日録」 ["Daily Record" of Yukio Mishima] (in Japanese). Michitani. ISBN 978-4-915841-39-2.
- Andō, Takeshi (1998). 三島由紀夫の生涯 [The Life of Yukio Mishima] (in Japanese). Natsume Shobo. ISBN 978-4-931391-39-0.
- Chujō, Shōhei, ed. (2005). 三島由紀夫が死んだ日―あの日、何が終り何が始まったのか [The Day Yukio Mishima Died: What Ended and What Began on That Day] (in Japanese). Jitsugyo no Nihon Sha. ISBN 978-4-408-53472-5.
- Chujō, Shōhei, ed. (2005). 続・三島由紀夫が死んだ日―あの日は、どうしていまも生々しいのか [Sequel - The Day Yukio Mishima Died: Why is That Day Still So Vivid to Us] (in Japanese). Jitsugyo no Nihon Sha. ISBN 978-4-408-53482-4.
- Date, Munekatsu (1972). 裁判記録「三島由紀夫事件」 [Judicial Record of the "Mishima Incident"] (in Japanese). Kodansha. NCID BN0140450X.
- Dōmoto, Masaki (2005). 回想 回転扉の三島由紀夫 [Reminiscence: The Revolving Door of Yukio Mishima]. Bunshun Shinsho 477 (in Japanese). Bungeishunjū. ISBN 978-4-16-660477-7.
- Fukushima, Jurō (2005) [1st pub. Shinjinbutu Ōraisha:1975]. 再訂資料・三島由紀夫 [Re-Edition Document - Yukio Mishima] (in Japanese) (Enlarged ed.). Chobunsha. ISBN 978-4-88695-180-9.
- Furuya, Kenzō (1998). 「内向の世代」論 [On the "Introverted Generation"] (in Japanese). Keio University Press. ISBN 978-4-7664-0707-5.
- Hamasaki, Yōsuke (2020). 三島由紀夫―なぜ、死んでみせねばならなかったのか [Yukio Mishima: Why did He have to Show His Dying]. The Essence of Postwar Thought (in Japanese). NHK Publishing, Inc. ISBN 978-4-14-081832-9.
- Hasegawa, Izumi, ed. (1971). 現代のエスプリ 三島由紀夫 [Modern Esprit Yukio Mishima] (in Japanese). Shibundo. NCID BN09636225.
- Hasegawa, Izumi; Takeda, Katsuhiko, eds. (1976). 三島由紀夫事典 [Encyclopedia of Yukio Mishima] (in Japanese). Meiji Shoin. ISBN 978-4-625-40025-4. NCID BN01686605.
- Hayashi, Fusao; others (1970). 現代日本文學大系61 林房雄・保田與重郎・亀井勝一郎・蓮田善明集 [Collection of Their Works – Fusao Hayashi, Yojuro Yasuda, Katsuichiro Kamei, and Zenmei Hasuda]. Modern Japanese Literature Series 61 (in Japanese). Chikuma Shobō. ISBN 978-4-480-10061-0. NCID BN03966872.
- Hayashi, Fusao (1972). 悲しみの琴―三島由紀夫への鎮魂歌 [The Harp of Sorrows: Requiem for Yukio Mishima] (in Japanese). Bungeishunjū. NCID BN08146344.
- Hirano, Keiichiro (2023). 三島由紀夫論 [An Essay on Yukio Mishima] (in Japanese). Shinchosha. ISBN 978-4-10-426010-2.
- Hiraoka, Azusa (1996) [1st pub. 1972]. 伜・三島由紀夫 [My Son – Yukio Mishima]. Bunshu Bunko (in Japanese) (Paperback ed.). Bungeishunjū. ISBN 978-4-16-716204-7.
- Hosaka, Masayasu (2001) [1st pub. Kodansha:1980]. 三島由紀夫と楯の会事件 [Yukio Mishima and the Tatenokai Incident]. Kadokawa Bunko (in Japanese) (Enlarged/Revised ed.). Kadokawa Shoten. ISBN 978-4-04-355602-1.
- Inoue, Takashi (2010). 三島由紀夫 幻の遺作を読む―もう一つの『豊饒の海』 [Reading a Never-before-published Phantom Posthumous Work of Yukio Mishima: Another "The Sea of Fertility"]. Kobunsha Shinsho (in Japanese). Kobunsha. ISBN 978-4-334-03594-5.
- Isoda, Kōichi, ed. (1983). 新潮日本文学アルバム20 三島由紀夫 [Yukio Mishima]. Shincho Japanese literature Album No.20 (in Japanese). Shinchosha. ISBN 978-4-10-620620-7.
- Itasaka, Gō; Suzuki, Kunio (2010). 三島由紀夫と一九七〇年 [Yukio Mishima and 1970] (in Japanese). Rokusaisha. ISBN 978-4-8463-0772-1.
- Itasaka, Gō (2017). 三島由紀夫は、なぜ昭和天皇を殺さなかったのか [Why Yukio Mishima didn't Kill Emperor Shōwa] (in Japanese). Rokusaisha. ISBN 978-4-8463-1213-8.
- Itō, Katsuhiko (2006). 最後のロマンティーク 三島由紀夫 [The Last Romantic: Yukio Mishima] (in Japanese). Shinyōsha. ISBN 978-4-7885-0981-8.
- Iwashita, Hisafumi (2016) [1st pub. Yuzankaku:2011]. 直面（ヒタメン）―三島由紀夫の若き日の恋 [The Face with No Mask (Hitamen): Yukio Mishima's Love in His Youth]. Bunshun Bunko (in Japanese) (Paperback ed.). Bungeishunjū. ISBN 978-4-16-790735-8.
- Kan, Takayuki (2018). 三島由紀夫と天皇 [Yukio Mishima and the Emperor]. Heibonsha Shinsho 896 (in Japanese). Heibonsha. ISBN 978-4-582-85896-9.
- Kasuya, Kazuki (2006). 作家が死ぬと時代が変わる―戦後日本と雑誌ジャーナリズム [When an Author Dies, the Times Change: Postwar Japan and Magazine Journalism] (in Japanese). Nikkei, Inc. ISBN 978-4-532-16561-1.
- Keene, Donald (2012) [1st pub. 1992]. 日本文学史―近代・現代篇（六） [History of Japanese Literature: Modern/Contemporary pieces No.6] (in Japanese). Translated by Tokuoka, Takao; Kakuchi, Yukio (Paperback ed.). Chuokoron-Shinsha. ISBN 978-4-12-205647-3.
- Keene, Donald (2019) [1st pub. 2005]. 思い出の作家たち―谷崎・川端・三島・安部・司馬 [Memorable Authors: Tanizaki, Kawabata, Mishima, Abe, and Shiba]. Shincho Bunko (in Japanese) (Paperback ed.). Shinchosha. ISBN 978-4-10-131355-9.
- Kitakage, Yukō (2006). 三島由紀夫と葉隠武士道 [Yukio Mishima and Hagakure Bushido] (in Japanese). Hakua Shobo. ISBN 978-4-89172-683-6.
- Kojima, Chikako (1996) [1st pub. Kōsōsha:1980]. 三島由紀夫と檀一雄 [Yukio Mishima and Kazuo Dan]. Chikuma Bunko (in Japanese) (Paperback ed.). Chikuma Shobō. ISBN 978-4-480-03182-2.
- Komuro, Naoki (1985). 三島由紀夫が復活する [Yukio Mishima will be Resurrected] (in Japanese). Mainichi Communications. NCID BN10913162.
- Matsumoto, Ken'ichi (1990). 蓮田善明 日本伝説 [Zenmei Hasuda: A Japanese Legend] (in Japanese). Kawade Shobō Shinsha. ISBN 978-4-309-00657-4.
- Matsumoto, Ken'ichi (2007) [1st pub. Kawade Shobō Shinsha:1987]. 三島由紀夫亡命伝説 [The Legend of Yukio Mishima's Exile]. Ken'ichi Matsumoto Legend Series 2 (in Japanese) (Enlarged ed.). Henkyōsha. ISBN 978-4-326-95039-3.
- Matsumoto, Tōru (1990). 三島由紀夫 年表作家読本 [Yukio Mishima: Author's Chronological Reader] (in Japanese). Kawade Shobō Shinsha. ISBN 978-4-309-70052-6.
- Matsumoto, Tōru; Satō, Hideaki; Inoue, Takashi, eds. (2000). 三島由紀夫事典 [Encyclopedia of Yukio Mishima] (in Japanese). Bensei Shuppan. ISBN 978-4-585-06018-5.
- Matsumoto, Tōru; Satō, Hideaki; Inoue, Takashi, eds. (2001). 三島由紀夫の時代 [The Times of Yukio Mishima]. Collection of Essays on Yukio Mishima I (in Japanese). Bensei Shuppan. ISBN 978-4-585-04041-5.
- Matsumoto, Tōru, ed. (2010). 別冊太陽 日本のこころ175―三島由紀夫 [Separate Volume Taiyo – Hearts of Japan 175: Yukio Mishima] (in Japanese). Heibonsha. ISBN 978-4-582-92175-5.
- Mitani, Makoto (1999) [1st pub. Kasama Shoin:1985 (an out-of-print book)]. 級友 三島由紀夫 [My Classmate: Yukio Mishima]. Chuko Bunko (in Japanese) (Reprinted ed.). Chuokoron-Shinsha. ISBN 978-4-12-203557-7.
- Miyoshi, Yukio, ed. (1989). 三島由紀夫必携 [Yukio Mishima Must-Have] (in Japanese). Gakutōsha. ISBN 978-4-312-00522-9.
- Mochimaru, Hiroshi; Satō, Matsuo (2010). 証言 三島由紀夫・福田恆存 たった一度の対決 [Testimonies: The Only Once Confrontation between Yukio Mishima and Tsuneari Fukuda] (in Japanese). Bungeishunjū. ISBN 978-4-16-373250-3.
- Murakami, Takeo (2010). 君たちには分からない―「楯の會」で見た三島由紀夫 [You Guys don't Understand: Yukio Mishima that I Saw in "Tatenokai"] (in Japanese). Shinchosha. ISBN 978-4-10-327851-1.
- Muramatsu, Takeshi (1990). 三島由紀夫の世界 [The World of Yukio Mishima] (in Japanese). Shinchosha. ISBN 978-4-10-321402-1.
- Murata, Haruki (2023). 三島由紀夫は蓮田善明の後を追った―開かれた皇室への危惧 [Yukio Mishima Followed in Zenmei Hasuda's footsteps: Concerns over the Open Imperial Family] (in Japanese). Tendensha. ISBN 978-4-88656-569-3.
- Nakagawa, Yusuke (2010). 昭和45年11月25日―三島由紀夫自決、日本が受けた衝撃 [November 25, 1970: Yukio Mishima's Suicide, the Impact on Japan]. Gentosha Shinsho 184 (in Japanese). Gentosha. ISBN 978-4-344-98185-0.
- Nakayasu, Hiromichi (1973). 悲愴美に魅せられた作家 三島由紀夫の死―ナルシスはなぜ…… [The Death of Yukio Mishima, a Writer Enthralled by Pathetic Beauty: Why did Narcissus...]. Monthly Uwasa – August 1973, 2nd Anniversary Special Issue (in Japanese). Uwasa Publ.: 48–60.
- Nathan, John (1975) [1st pub. Little, Brown and Company:1974]. Mishima: A Biography. Tut books. North Clarendon, Vermont: Tuttle Publishing. ISBN 978-4805304020.
  - Nathan, John (2000). Mishima: A Biography (New ed.). Boston, Massachusetts: Da Capo Press. ISBN 978-0-306-80977-4.
- Nathan, John (2000) [1st pub. 1976 (an out-of-print book)]. 新版 三島由紀夫─ある評伝 [New Edition – Mishima: A Biography] (in Japanese). Translated by Noguchi, Takehiko (New/Revised ed.). Shinchosha. ISBN 978-4-10-505702-2.
- Nihon Gakusei Shimbun, ed. (1971). 回想の三島由紀夫 [Yukio Mishima in Reminiscence] (in Japanese). Gyōsei Tsūshinsha. NCID BN0927582X.
- Okamura, Ao (2020) [1st pub. Gendai Shokan:1990]. 三島由紀夫と森田必勝―楯の会事件 若き行動者の軌跡 [Yukio Mishima and Masakatsu Morita: The Tatenokai Incident, the Trajectory of a Young Activist]. Kōjinsha NF Bunko (in Japanese) (Paperback ed.). Ushio Shobo Kōjin Shinsha. ISBN 978-4-7698-3191-4.
- Okayama, Norihiro (2014). 三島由紀夫外伝 [The Side Story of Yukio Mishima] (in Japanese). Sairyusha. ISBN 978-4-7791-7022-5.
- Sakurai, Hidenori (2020). 三島由紀夫は何を遺したか [What did Yukio Mishima Leave Behind] (in Japanese). Kizuna Shuppan. ISBN 978-4-86663-128-8.
- Satō, Hideaki (2020). 三島由紀夫 悲劇への欲動 [Yukio Mishima: Instinctual Drive for Tragedy]. Iwanami Shisho 1852 (in Japanese). Iwanami Shoten. ISBN 978-4-00-431852-1.
- Scott-Stokes, Henry (1975) [1st pub. Ballantine Books:1974]. The Life and Death of Yukio Mishima. Tut books. North Clarendon, Vermont: Tuttle Publishing. ISBN 978-4805303917.
  - Scott-Stokes, Henry (2000). The Life and Death of Yukio Mishima (Enlarged/Revised ed.). New York City: Cooper Square Press. ISBN 978-0-8154-1074-4.
- Scott-Stokes, Henry (1985). 三島由紀夫─死と真実 [The Life and Death of Yukio Mishima] (in Japanese). Translated by Tokuoka, Takao. Diamond, Inc. ISBN 978-4-478-94056-3.
  - Scott-Stokes, Henry (1998). 三島由紀夫─生と死 [The Life and Death of Yukio Mishima] (in Japanese). Translated by Tokuoka, Takao (Enlarged/Revised ed.). Seiryu Publ. ISBN 978-4-916028-52-5.
- Shibasaki, Shinzō (2025). 三島由紀夫という迷宮―〈英雄〉を夢みた人 [The Labyrinth, that called Yukio Mishima: A Man Who Dreamed of Being a Hero] (in Japanese). Soshisha. ISBN 978-4-7942-2797-3.
- Shibata, Shōji (2012). 三島由紀夫 作品に隠された自決への道 [Yukio Mishima: The Path to Suicide Hidden in His Works] (in Japanese). Shodensha. ISBN 978-4-396-11300-1.
- Shibusawa, Tatsuhiko (1986) [1st pub. Rippū Shobo:1983]. 三島由紀夫おぼえがき [Memorandum on Yukio Mishima]. Chuko Bunko (in Japanese) (Paperback ed.). Chuokoron-Shinsha. ISBN 978-4-12-201377-3.
- Shigyō, Sōshū (2025). 永遠の三島由紀夫 [The Eternal Yukio Mishima] (in Japanese). Jitsugyo no Nihon Sha. ISBN 978-4-408-65121-7.
- Shimauchi, Keiji (2010). 三島由紀夫―豊饒の海へ注ぐ [Yukio Mishima: Flows into The Sea of Fertility]. Minerva Japan Biography Selection (in Japanese). Minerva Shobo. ISBN 978-4-623-05912-6.
- Sugiyama, Takao (2007). 「兵士」になれなかった三島由紀夫 [Yukio Mishima, who could not Become a "Soldier"]. Soldier Series (in Japanese). Shogakukan. ISBN 978-4-09-379773-3.
- Tekina, Osamu (2015). ミシマの警告―保守を偽装するB層の害毒 [Mishima's Warnings: The Poison of the B-class Disguised as Conservative] (in Japanese). Kodansha. ISBN 978-4-06-272784-6.
- Toda, Yoshio; Nagafuji, Takeshi (1978). よみがえる三島由紀夫―霊の人の文学と武と [Yukio Mishima Resurrected: The Person of Spirit, His Literature and Martial Arts] (in Japanese). Nippon Kyobunnsha. ISBN 978-4531060924. NCID BN09146011.
- Tokuoka, Takao (1999) [1st pub. 1996]. 五衰の人―三島由紀夫私記 [The Man of the Decay of the Angel: Private Notes about Yukio Mishima] (in Japanese) (Paperback ed.). Bungeishunjū. ISBN 978-4-16-744903-2.
- Tomioka, Koichirō (2020). 天皇論―江藤淳と三島由紀夫 [Their Essays on Emperor: Jun Etō and Yukio Mishima] (in Japanese). Bungeishunjū. ISBN 978-4-16-391209-7.
- Yamamoto, Kiyokatsu (2001). 自衛隊「影の部隊」―三島由紀夫を殺した真実の告白 [Japan Self-Defense Forces "A Unit of Shadow": Confession of a Truth that Killed Yukio Mishima] (in Japanese). Kodansha. ISBN 978-4-06-210781-5.
- Yamamoto, Mitsunobu (2017). 私の中の三島由紀夫 [Yukio Mishima in Me] (in Japanese). Hakurosha. ISBN 978-4-434-23098-1.
- Yamauchi, Yukito (2014). 三島由紀夫の肉体 [Yukio Mishima's Body] (in Japanese). Kawade Shobō Shinsha. ISBN 978-4-309-02318-2.
- Yukio Mishima Study Group, ed. (2024). 三島由紀夫 憂国と情念 [Yukio Mishima: His Patriotism and Passion] (in Japanese). Namiki Shobo. ISBN 978-4-89063-455-2.
- Chuokoron-Shinsha, ed. (2010). 中央公論特別編集 三島由紀夫と戦後 [Chūō Kōron Special Edition – Yukio Mishima and the Postwar Period] (in Japanese). Chuokoron-Shinsha. ISBN 978-4-12-004161-7.
- Kawade Shobō Shinsha, ed. (1983) [1st pub. 1975]. 文芸読本 三島由紀夫 [Literary Reader: Yukio Mishima] (in Japanese) (New Binding ed.). Kawade Shobō Shinsha. ISBN 978-4-309-70002-1. NCID BA35307535.
- Kawade Shobō Shinsha, ed. (1990). 新文芸読本 三島由紀夫 [New Literary Reader: Yukio Mishima] (in Japanese). Kawade Shobō Shinsha. ISBN 978-4-309-70155-4.
- Kodansha, ed. (1971). 群像 1971年2月・特大号 三島由紀夫 死と芸術 [Gunzo – February 1971 Extra Large Issue – Yukio Mishima, His Death and Art] (in Japanese). Kodansha. ASIN B01NH2WT0X.
- Roman Co., ed. (1975). 浪曼 新年号（12・1月合併号） 特集・三島由紀夫の不在 [Roman New Year Issue (December/January Combined Number) – Special Feature: The Absence of Yukio Mishima] (in Japanese). Roman Co.
- Seidosha, ed. (1976). ユリイカ 詩と批評 特集・三島由紀夫―傷つける美意識の系譜 [Eureka Poetry and Criticism – Special Feature: Yukio Mishima, The Genealogy of Hurtful Aesthetics] (in Japanese). Seidosha. ASIN B00UYW77RS.
- Shinchosha, ed. (1971). 新潮 1月・臨時増刊 三島由紀夫読本 [Shinchō – January Extra Special Issue: Yukio Mishima Reader] (in Japanese). Shinchosha. ASIN B00QRZ32NO.
- Shinchosha, ed. (1971). 新潮 2月・追悼特集号 [Shinchō – February Memorial Special Issue] (in Japanese). Shinchosha. ASIN B0DGK58TXY.
- Yumani Shobo, ed. (1999). 近代作家追悼文集成〈42〉三島由紀夫 [Collection of Memorial Texts for Modern Writers 42: Yukio Mishima] (in Japanese). Yumani Shobo. ISBN 978-4-89714-645-4.
