= Voices of the Fallen Heroes =

- Short story by Yukio Mishima
- Original title: Eirei no Koe 英霊の聲
- Translator: Paul McCarthy
- Country: Japan
- Language: Japanese
- Genre: Short story

Publication
- Published in: Bungei
- Publisher: Kawade Shobō Shinsha
- Publication date: June 1966
- Published in English: January 2025

"Voices of the Fallen Heroes" (英霊の聲, Eirei no Koe) is a 1966 short story by the Japanese author Yukio Mishima. The work depicts the spirits of young officers who were executed by firing squad in the February 26 Incident and the kamikaze pilots who died trying to become Kamikaze typhoon in the Pacific War, both of whom are angry and curse Emperor Shōwa's declaration of humanity.

The story is structured like a Warrior play (修羅物, Shura mono) of Noh, with two scenes and six acts, and features the poignant and sorrowful refrain that repeats, "Why has our Sumeragi become a human being?"

This politically charged work marked a turning point for Mishima in the 1960s, and served as a precursor to his later critical essays such as On the Defense of Culture (文化防衛論, Bunka Bōeiron).

A draft of seven songs entitled "Songs of the Bad Retainers" (悪臣の歌, Akushin no Uta) which is considered a preliminary version of the songs featured in the "Voices of the Fallen Heroes", was discovered in 1999 at the Yukio Mishima Literary Museum (三島由紀夫文学館, Mishima Yukio Bungaku-kan) and was made public in the commemorative exhibition catalogue. The phrase "Bad Retainers" (悪臣, Akushin) alludes to the ambiguous position of the officers involved in the February 26 Incident who were not enshrined at Yasukuni Shrine as "Eirei" (英霊).

== First publication ==
This work first appeared in the June 1966 issue of the literary magazine Bungei, and was published as a collection of his works, Voices of the Fallen Heroes, by Kawade Shobo Shinsha on June 30 of the same year. This book also includes "Patriotism" and the play Tenth-Day Chrysanthemum (十日の菊, Tōka no kiku), and was compiled as the "February 26 Incident Trilogy."

== Background ==
Mishima was 11 years old when the February 26 Incident occurred. He stated that one of his motivations for writing "Voices of the Fallen Heroes" was that "with the failure of the February 26 Incident, some great God had died," and that when he traced his "desire to console the spirits of the true heroes who had long dominated me, to clear their disgrace, and to attempt to restore their dignity," he was inevitably troubled by the Emperor's declaration of humanity.

The defeat in the war completely divided the history of the Shōwa era into an early and a late period. Having lived through both periods, I felt a strong need to search for the basis of my own continuity and logical consistency. (Omitted)
At that time, what I found most compelling was not the new Constitution, which defined the Emperor as a "symbol," but the Emperor's own "Declaration of Humanity." This question naturally cast a shadow all the way back to the February 26 Incident, and following that shadow led me to the point where I could not help but write "Voices of the Fallen Heroes." It may seem ridiculous to call by myself it an "aesthetic," but the more I delved into my aesthetic, the more I had to realize that the bedrock of the imperial system lurked beneath it. I could not avoid it forever.

— Yukio Mishima, The February 26 Incident and Me

In writing this work, Mishima referred to the prison memoirs (Prison Diary and Action Record) of Asaichi Isobe, a young officer who was executed in the February 26 Incident, and The February 26 Incident (1957), written by Tsukasa Kono (河野司), the older brother of Hisashi Kono (河野壽), who participated in the incident. (Note: Captain Hisashi Kono (河野壽) was wounded in the chest during a shootout with the police escort, and later escaped from the hospital to commit seppuku, the only officer involved in the February 26 Incident to do so. His older brother, Tsukasa Kono, heard about Mishima's "Patriotism" from a friend and, thinking that it was based on his younger brother, sent Mishima a letter of inquiry, which led to his acquaintance.)

Tsukasa Kono has recounted a visit to Mishima's home in Minamimagome, Ōta, Tokyo to discuss the causes of the failure of the February 26 Incident. When Kono said, "I think it ultimately comes down to clarifying the relationship with the Emperor," Mishima agreed, saying, "So that's what you think, too." And, when the young officers accused of being part of a rebel force resolved to commit seppuku, atoning for the crimes they had committed as the Emperor's children, and requested through a chamberlain that an imperial emissary be sent to assist them, Emperor Shōwa replied, "If they want to commit suicide, do so freely; an imperial emissary is out of the question for something like such persons." Regarding the Emperor's putting his personal feelings at the forefront, Mishima said to Kono, "This is not what a Japanese Emperor should do. It's sad."

Kono further asked Mishima, "If the officers had known what the Emperor had said, would they have died shouting 'Long live the Emperor'?" Mishima replied, tearfully and choked up, "Even if their lord had no virtues as a lord, and had not performed his duties as a lord. I believe those men were sure to shout long live the Emperor, whom they believed to be a god, in keeping with the code of the path of a vassal. But that incident was a tragedy for Japan."

After publishing "Voices of the Fallen Heroes," Mishima wrote in a letter to Tsukasa Kono, "I wrote this work with the intention of dedicating it to the souls of your younger brother and the other officers who took part in the February 26 Uprising. By the way, be that as it may, I cannot help but feel irritated by the satiation, stagnation, and lethargy of modern Japan. Is this just only my particular hysteria?"

And, in an interview from the magazine Sunday Mainichi (サンデー毎日), he said, "The Kokutai, the national system, has collapsed since the Emperor made his Humanity Declaration. All the moral confusion of the postwar period stems from that," and he argued that this was an important issue related to the question of "love" mediated by the "Emperor" (God), which was born out of Japan's agricultural fundamentalism (農本主義, Nohonshugi).

The more a nation modernizes, the less meaningful the cooler, become personal relationships. For people who live in such a modern society love is impossible. For example, if A believes that he loves B, there is no means for him to be sure of it, and vice versa. (Omitted) If there is no image of a third man whom the two lovers have in common――the apex of the triangle――love ends with eternal skepticism. This is what D. H. Lawrence calls agnosticism. From ancient times the Japanese have had an image of the apex of the triangle (God), which was born out of Japan's agricultural fundamentalism; and everyone had a theory of love, so that he should not be isolated. The Emperor was the absolute for us Japanese. This is why I always say that Sinto festivals are necessary.

— Yukio Mishima, Yukio Mishima's Criticism of the "Declaration of Humanity": The Ripples caused by the work "Voices of the Fallen Heroes"

In a dialogue with Shun Akiyama in 1968, Mishima said that he was "saved" by writing "Voices of the Fallen Heroes."

I once wrote a series of short stories, including Acts of Worship. At the time, I wondered what would become of me. I really hated literature. I hated the feeling of powerlessness that oppressed me. It felt like nothing I did was worthwhile. But when I wrote "Voices of the Fallen Heroes," I started to feel more alive. No matter what other people say, as long as I'm alive and well, that's all that matters. That was probably a small self-revolution. I felt fine.

— Yukio Mishima, Talking about My Literature, a dialogue with Shun Akiyama

== Composition ==
The story is structured in two scenes and six acts, following the style of Warrior play (修羅物, Shura mono) of Noh. The Jo-ha-kyū are as follows.

- The first scene (第一場, Dai-ichi ba)
1. Beginning act (序の段, Jo no dan) – Appearing of "Supporting role" (ワキ, Waki) and "Companion of Supporting role" (ワキヅレ, Waki dure).
2. Break act (破の段, Ha no dan) – "Leading role before he step in behind the curtain" (前シテ, Mae Shite) appears. Their questions and answers.
3. Rapid act (急の段, Kyū no dan) – "Higher part of the song" (上歌, Age uta) by Mae Shite, and "stepping in behind the curtain" (中入, Naka-iri).
- The second scene (第二場, Dai-ni ba)
1. Beginning act – "Song while waiting for" (待謡, Machi utai) by Waki.
2. Break act – "Leading role after he came out behind the curtain" (後シテ, Nochi Shite) appears. "Anguish dance" (カケリ, Kakeri) and "Songs and Dance" (クセ, Kuse) by Nochi Shite.
3. Rapid act – Ends (切, Kiri) with complaints about the suffering of the World of eternal struggle, or World of warlike demigods (阿修羅, Asura).

The characters are;

- The spirits of young officers who died in the February 26 Incident – Leading roles before Naka-iri
- The spirits of young kamikaze pilots – Leading roles after Naka-iri
- Kimura Sensei – Supporting role
- Shigeo Kawasaki, a blind young medium – Companion of Supporting role

== Synopsis ==
The work is written in the form of the narrator, who attended the "Return to God Society" meeting presided over by Kimura Sensei, a Shinto priest (審神者, Saniwa) recording "as faithfully as possible" what he saw and heard there. It describes how the spirits of rebel officers who died in the February 26 Incident in 1936 and Kamikaze Special Attack Force soldiers who died in the Greater East Asia War (大東亜戦争, Dai Tō-A Sensō) one after another possess and curse a young spiritual medium, Shigeo Kawasaki.

The repeated phrase uttered by the spirits—"Why has our Sumeragi become a human being?"—is directed at Emperor Shōwa. The "betrayed spirits" of the soldiers are saddened and indignant at the Emperor's behavior during the February 26 Incident and his subsequent "Declaration of Humanity" on January 1, 1946, after Japan's defeat, which turned him into a "human being," and the voices of these heroic spirits echo throughout in the Shinto shrine.

In those dark times, alone, without a friend apart from a handful of old trusted retainers, he has endured all sorts of bitter pain, as a human being. As a human being, purely shining in the distance.
That is fine. Who could reproach His Majesty for that?
But there were two times in the history of his reign when His Majesty should have been a god. How shall we put it? In performing his duty as a human being, he should have been a god. Just those two times, in the ultimate depths of his humanity, truly, he should have been a god. Both times, His Majesty missed the mark. When he most needed to be a god, he remained a human being.

— Yukio Mishima, "Voices of the Fallen Heroes" Chapter 7

The story ends with Shigeo Kawasaki, a medium who has absorbed the power of a spirit with a strong grudge, taking his last breath, and concludes with his face not being Kawasaki's, but having been transformed into the "ambiguous face of someone unknown."

== Reactions at the time ==
In literary reviews of "Voices of the Fallen Heroes," at that time, while some expressed sympathy for parts of the work's content, there were few positive reviews expressing complete approval, due to the work's ideological aspects and criticism of the Emperor Shōwa. Because of the criticism of the Emperor, Mishima's home received numerous letters of protest and threats from established right-wingers. And, the established left-wing Japanese Communist Party condemned the work for being cast in "the rhetoric of the Right", in its official newspaper, Shimbun Akahata. On the other hand, Mishima's home received many "warm letters of gratitude, sympathy, and encouragement," and some even made the effort to visit him. Some even contacted him offering to provide bodyguards, saying, "If necessary, we may send several men to Tokyo to protect you from the Communists."

The reactions from the literary world were, Kiyoteru Hanada, while appreciating it to a certain extent as a critique of the Emperor from the right-wing, criticized it negatively, saying it "plays antics." Jun Etō criticized the work that it is a sensational and controversial work that astutely captures the voids in the national psyche, but what one senses from it is an "exposed idea," and he called it "ideological" and "strangely obscene" compared to "Patriotism," which, despite its theme of eroticism, was "surprisingly clean" and "aesthetic." Etō had a different understanding of Emperor Shōwa's "Declaration of Humanity" than Mishima, believing that the Emperor did not change just because he made that declaration. (Note: At the time of Emperor Shōwa's death 18 years after the Mishima Incident, Jun Etō said, "The Sumeramikoto never became a human being. He passed away as the Sumeramikoto. If I could have a conversation with Mishima's spirit, I would like to ask him again 'How has Emperor Shōwa became a human being?'." He also said that he believed that Mishima had seen the Emperor like an American and that the Emperor became a human being because he made the Declaration of Humanity, and that his own opinion differed from Mishima's in that Etō thought that the Declaration of Humanity was just all mouth. He also talked, "I believe that a nationalist must unconditionally trust the Emperor. I think that Mishima died in the way that he did because he did not unconditionally trust the Emperor.") Shintaro Ishihara commented that it was a mistake for Mishima's methodology, which rejected the secular world, to embark on history.

Takeshi Muramatsu (村松剛) and Takeo Okuno showed a certain understanding of the work and tried to understand Mishima's intentions. Takao Aeba (饗庭孝男) argued that the work is beautiful precisely because it is impossible to "reinstate" the spirits of the war dead. Uzuhiko Ashizu (葦津珍彦) praised the work for its significance, as it seeks to console the souls of soldiers and restore their honor.

Kenkichi Yamamoto agreed with Mishima's motivation for creating the work, which was to criticize the "empty hypocrisy" and "disgusting vulgarity" brought about by postwar democracy, but commented that "for a Mishima's work, the imagination is impoverished." He also commented, as an aside, that while viewing the Emperor as a god was a "hard-nosed rational ideology that emerged after the Meiji era," he noted that compared to the "vulgarity of heart" of modern people who are unable to honestly cherish the "feelings and actions" of the officers in the February 26 Incident and Special Attack Units, the "mental space" of Meiji people who cherished the feelings and actions of the Aizu Byakkotai samurais who died for their feudal lord and the Tokugawa family was "far more admirable."

It seems that Mishima attributes the gray stagnation and decadence of the Japanese spirit today to the Emperor's loss of divinity. It's not hard to understand why he felt compelled to write such an extreme novel. Everything brought about by postwar democracy appears to him as hollow hypocrisy and abhorrent vulgarity. But once the Emperor has abandoned his divinity, the people cannot restore him to his divine state. If the author knew this was impossible, yet still chose to write, it speaks to the despair he sees in the current situation. He must be irritated by the complacency of intellectuals who believe that this void can be filled with the Omamori called democracy.
However, perhaps due to its topical stance of calling for the restoration of the young war dead, this work makes me feel that for a Mishima's work, the imagination is impoverished. I think this is a religious issue, not an issue with the Emperor system.

— Kenkichi Yamamoto, Literary Comments

Jakucho Setouchi realized that the scene at the end of the story, in which the dead spiritual medium's face transforms into the "ambiguous face of someone unknown," is a metaphor to Emperor Shōwa, and thought that "Mishima-san has risked his life for this work," she immediately sent Mishima a letter. About its hidden intention, was replied, "I am extremely fortunate that the initial response to this work has been such generous praise." "The key is hidden in the last few lines, and it seems your keen insight has detected it. And you called this work Noh, I was aiming for a Shura mono. It is a small piece, but by writing this, I feel like I could at least make up some apology for having survived twenty years after the war." from Mishima.

Tsukasa Kono, the elder brother of Captain Hisashi Kono (河野壽), the only officer who committed seppuku in the February 26 Incident, stated that Mishima's "Voices of the Fallen Heroes," clearly articulated things that "we as surviving families simply could not say" even more than 30 years after the incident. And he expressed gratitude that the work "pointedly articulated" both "an understanding of the young officers and, especially, distrust toward the Emperor," adding that "Mishima spoke for every single fervent wish that the incident's participants and their families wanted to express and sought to have understood."

And, in July, the month following the work was published, Tsukasa Kono visited Masaharu Gotōda, who was then the Vice-Commissioner of the National Police Agency, on a certain matter. Gotōda took "Voices of the Fallen Heroes" from his desk and asked, "Have you read this? What are your thoughts on it?" This was shown that the Metropolitan Police Department had promptly reviewed the work's content and was interested in it.

== Research and interpretation ==
Bunzō Hashikawa (橋川文三) a historian and researcher of the Japan Romantic School (日本浪曼派, Nihon Rōman-ha), has begun by stating that his opinion was that "the theme of the Emperor and young officers in the February 26 Incident could only be fully portrayed by someone with the genius of Dostoevsky," and has given the reason for this as the theme holds "theological issues" and involves issues related to "the world of human faith, which has long been filled with fascination and fear, between orthodoxy and heresy." Hashikawa has evaluated "Voices of the Fallen Heroes" as being filled with "the rage and resentment of those banished from a certain supreme bliss" to an incredible degree, and that "the cries of those who stagger in pitiful forms on the border between the living and the dead come like a menacing low voice that reaches our ears as living beings." He went on to say that in the work, the author Mishima plays "the role of a shaman possessed by the souls of those who have turned into evil demons," and has explained as follows:

Here, Mishima is trying to reach the ultimate conclusion of what the Emperor means to the Japanese, what the war waged under his divine majesty and those who died in it meant, and most of all, what it means for the Japanese to survive and prosper after the death of the Emperor as a God. The fact that this is a work of rage means that it is nothing other than a critique of modern Japanese civilization.

— Bunzō Hashikawa, The Eyes of Man-in-the-middle

Norihiro Katō (加藤典洋), a literary critic, has stated that "Voices of the Fallen Heroes," written in 1966, is one of Japan's most important works in the postwar period, saying that he is glad "that someone like Mishima existed in postwar Japan." He also has mentioned that "the meaning of postwar Japan" would have been "completely different" with or without Mishima, and that "without Mishima, Japan's postwar period would have ended up being a farce." Katō has analyzed that Mishima's ideas expressed in "Voices of the Fallen Heroes" "have a universal line of thought that one would think if one were free from any preconceptions," and untainted by "local postwar logic in Japan," Mishima's presentation of "universal human thinking" for the first time made it clear "how paradoxical Japan's postwar linguistic space was." He then has offered the following commentary on the theme of this work, which includes the metaphor of the spirit medium Kawasaki's face changing into the "ambiguous face" of Emperor Shōwa at the end of the work:

The thema of the work is that sending his vassals to the battlefield to die for him, and then claiming later that he is not a god, is unethical "as a human being" (paradoxically), and Emperor Shōwa absolutely deserves to be condemned. However, the subject making this condemnation no longer exists. Having betrayed the war dead, and living in a world that has changed its ideology from the prewar era, he is just as guilty. Condemnation can only come in exchange for the death of the condemner himself. It is this intuition that leads to the ending of the work in the way it is.

— Norihiro Katō, Its Universality

Literary critic Kōichirō Tomioka (富岡幸一郎), looking at the historical background of the time, which was marked by the prosperity brought about by rapid economic growth and the resulting problems of pollution, both of which are also depicted in "Voices of the Fallen Heroes," has explained, "While the Japanese were becoming materially wealthy, they were also beginning to feel an incurable spiritual void in the context of their mass society," and has stated that Mishima threw this work at this "void."

The question he posed was whether Japan's unprecedented postwar economic recovery was in fact nothing more than a delusional "prosperity" that blossomed when the Japanese forgot the meaning of the war they fought and the reality of defeat, when they forgot the souls of those who went to their deaths for their country and their families and compatriots, and when they abandoned their national pride. Mishima saw the origin of this delusion in Emperor Shōwa's "Declaration of Humanity."

— Kōichirō Tomioka, Yukio Mishima's Monotheistic "The Emperor"

In his essay on the kamikaze, Ivan Morris has observed that while the kamikaze pilots expressed a desire for repaying their obligation to their families, the Emperor, and the nation as one family, they did not simply believe in an afterlife or reincarnation. He has considered that they felt doubt, fear of death, and anguish, and they knowing Japan would defeat, yet they actively embraced their own demise through a unique Japanese spirit, and he has read the tradition of Bushido behind their preparedness. And Morris has touched upon Mishima's depiction in "Voices of the Fallen Heroes" where Mishima argues that it was not the defeat itself, but the Emperor's declaration of humanity that made it impossible to assuage the pilots' sense of failure and amounted to a posthumous profanation of their deaths, that because of the declaration turned the principle for which the fallen heroes sacrificed themselves into a "fictitious notion." But Morris has said, 'While having respect for Yukio Mishima, I believe that the motivations of the special attack corps volunteers were not as simple as the impression given by this elegy, but were considerably more complex."

Comparing "Voices of the Fallen Heroes" with the original Aoi no Ue, which Mishima used in his Modern Noh Play, The Lady Aoi, Keiji Shimauchi (島内景二), a doctor of classical literature, has observed the parallel structure of "Rokujo no Miyasudokoro = Soldiers" and "Hikaru Genji = Emperor." Paying attention that Mishima wrote in his creative draft notes for "Voices of the Fallen Heroes" that "the medium dies. The incarnation of the Emperor," he has pointed out the similarities between "Kawasaki-kun," who died in cursing for long stretches by the heroic spirits of the February 26 Incident and the Kamikaze pilots, and Genji's wife "Aoi no Ue," who was cursed to death by Rokujō no Miyasudokoro who was betrayed by Genji, but also deeply loved him. Shimauchi then has analyzed this as the true reason why the militia organization Mishima founded was named the "Tatenokai (Shield Society)," comes from classical waka included in the Man'yōshū, was to protect from the cursing.

"My insignificant shield for the Great Lord Emperor" (醜の御楯, Shiko no mi-tate) (Note: The meaning of "ugly" (醜, shiko) here expresses a feeling of self-deprecation and humility.) does not simply refer to brave soldiers who serve as shields for the Emperor, protecting him and fighting against the enemy of the court (foreign enemies). The "Tatenokai (Shield Society)" may have been an organization created to take on the Emperor's place and bear the unrelenting anger of the countless heroes who died tragic deaths. Postwar Japan became obsessed with the false prosperity of the "Flourishing Shōwa era" (昭和元禄, Shōwa Genroku), degrading itself to a society where money and material happiness mattered more than spirituality. As a result, the rage of the countless heroes who sacrificed their precious lives to protect the "divine country" had nowhere to go. If left unchecked, that anger could be directed toward the Emperor himself. That's why in "Voices of the Fallen Heroes," "Kawasaki-kun" died in place of the Emperor.

— Keiji Shimauchi, Chapter 5 Yukio Mishima's struggle against Japanese culture: For whom can a human being die?

Shimauchi also has mentioned that in Mishima's play The Decline and Fall of The Suzaku (朱雀家の滅亡, Suzaku-ke no Metsubō), the Marquis Suzaku accepts his own downfall and becomes a "shield," and that Mishima, who died after shouting "Long live the Emperor!" (天皇陛下万歳, Tennō heika banzai) three times, also tried to fulfill his role of "taking on the anger of the war dead" by becoming "my insignificant shield" for the "Emperor" (or the "imperial system") in the same way. Shimauchi also has speculated that because Mishima was able to understand the anger of the war dead, he "tried to take that anger upon himself," and just as Kawasaki-kun's dead face resembled "the face of the Emperor," Mishima's "dying for the Emperor" was the same as "dying as Emperor."

Yōsuke Hamasaki (浜崎洋介), a literary critic, has talked that "Voices of the Fallen Heroes" is a masterpiece that "boils down to terrific condensed" the themes of Saburo Shiroyama's 1959 novel At the End of the Great Cause and brings them together under the theme of a certain "grudge." He also has mentioned that in a dialogue with Tsuneari Fukuda, Mishima said, "The Japanese will never die to protect democracy," and has explained that what this work deals with is the issue of "faith" that goes beyond political systems like democracy, and that it describes Mishima's "grudge" toward the postwar period, which had robbed the Japanese people of their "faith," as well as his criticism of the Emperor's "Declaration of Humanity."

Yuichiro Kawabata (川端祐一郎), a social engineer, has commented the composition of the depiction of the war dead gathering on the sea at night for a banquet and conversation as a striking visual image, calling it "extremely beautiful." And Kawabata has said, despite he being a relatively unreligious person, he could imagine "this is how Japan is sustained," and that the work's "beautiful composition is brimming with the Japanese view of the nation, ancestors, and life and death." He also has noted that the lines in the work, following the execution of the "Imperial Way Faction" officers who participated in the February 26 Incident, "the cause of our Imperial nation collapsed," and "the Chinese-mindedness (漢意, Kara-gokoro), (Note: The antonym of Kara-gokoro is Yamato-damashii.) Nazi-obsessed military clique paved the way for an unstoppable war," reflect Mishima's criticism of the "Control Faction" military and his view of modern Japanese history. And Kawabata himself has felt that from the February 26 Incident to the present day, the possibility of the "sincerity" of "Restoration Choice Spirits" (維新の志士, Ishin no shisi) moving the society has been lost, and has argued that the work reminds us that since the incident, "the Japanese society has become nothing more than a mechanical system."

Since then, the Japanese society has functioned only as a mechanical system. Perhaps that is why, towards the end of the war, the Emperor was reduced to being used as nothing more than a piece of equipment.
Not only was there a discontinuity following Japan's defeat in 1945 (Shōwa 20), but the February 26 Incident of 1936 (Shōwa 11) was also a major turning point for modern Japanese history. It made us realize the great loss of having become a society where "sincerity" no longer holds sway, and in that sense, this work was extremely stimulating.

— Yuichiro Kawabata, Chapter 1 [Discontinuity] The Feelings of Being an Orphan - Yukio Mishima's "Voices of the Fallen Heroes"

== Episodes ==
Mishima's mother, Shizue (倭文重), recalled the moment Mishima handed her the manuscript of "Voices of the Fallen Heroes" as follows:

"I wrote it all in one go last night. It's finished," he said when handed it to me, and upon reading it, my blood ran cold. When asked what inspired him to write it, I received a chilling answer. "My hand started moving of its own accord, and the pen glided across the paper of its own accord. No matter how hard I tried to stop it, I couldn't. In the middle of the night, I heard low murmuring coming from all corners of the room. It sounded like many voices. When I listened carefully, I realized they were the words of the soldiers who died in the February 26 Incident."
I was familiar with the term "vengeful ghosts," but the feeling that something was actually possessing my son Kimitake sent chills down my spine.

— Shizue Hiraoka, Like a Turbulent Current: On the seventh anniversary of Yukio Mishima's death

Shizue also said that two or three days before he began writing, Mishima had explained to her the impoverished and devastated conditions in rural Tōhoku region at the time of the February 26 Incident, "with tears in his eyes."

Takeo Okuno said that when he read "Voices of the Fallen Heroes," he felt that Mishima might have been possessed by the spirit of Asaichi Isobe, and recalled that on July 29, 1959, when the Okuno couple, Tatsuhiko Shibusawa and his wife, and the painter Kazutomo Fujino (藤野一友) and his wife were invited to Mishima's home and they were all playing Kokkuri-san, Mishima muttered in all seriousness, "The spirit of Isobe is interfering."

At a New Year's party held at Mishima's home on January 1, 1970, Mishima's disciple, actress Eiko Muramatsu (村松英子) heard Akihiro Maruyama say that the spirit of Asaichi Isobe was haunting Mishima, and at that moment, Mishima seemed shocked.

Director Masaki Dōmoto (堂本正樹) was approached by Mishima to see if he could stage "Voices of the Fallen Heroes" in the style of Noh. As Dōmoto was planning the production, he considered performing the play in an outdoor theater in the style of bonfire Noh due to restrictions imposed by fire safety laws. He told Mishima about the idea of entrusting the specific direction to Tetsuji Takechi, but Takechi and Mishima had different political positions at the time, and Mishima hesitated to do so, and the idea did not come to fruition.

On 11 November of the same year that the work was published, Mishima was invited to attend the autumn Imperial Garden Party (園遊会, Enyu-kai) with his wife. Takeo Okuno has said that "I was wondering that he was able to attend the party despite publishing such a work to curse the Emperor."

The diary of Sukemasa Irie, who served as a close aide to Emperor Shōwa for many years, contains an entry that indicates that Emperor Shōwa had some interest in Mishima and the Mishima Incident (三島事件, Mishima Jiken). And, based on Emperor Shōwa's response to a question about the "Declaration of Humanity" at the Imperial Household Press Club in August 1977, Kenichi Matsumoto has speculated that Emperor Shōwa may have been aware of the passage in Mishima's "Voices of the Fallen Heroe" that reads, "Why has our Sumeragi become a human being?"

== Voice recording ==
- Voices of the Fallen Heroes - From Yukio Mishima's "Voices of the Fallen Heroes" (EP record)
  - Released by Crown Records on April 29, 1970.
  - Reading: Yukio Mishima
  - Composition and Arrangement: Nobuyoshi Koshibe (越部信義)
  - Ryūteki (Dragon flute): Masakatsu Sekigawa (関河真克) (a member of Tatenokai)
  - Performance: Crown String Quartet
  - Jacket title lettering "英霊の聲": Yukio Mishima
  - Side A is "Rise! Young Red Lions – The Song of the Tatenokai"
    - Lyrics: Yukio Mishima
    - Composition and Arrangement: Nobuyoshi Koshibe
    - Singing: Yukio Mishima and the Tatenokai
- Poemusica: Heaven and Sea: Seventy-Two Chapters Dedicated to the Fallen Heroes (LP Record)
  - Released by Takt Records on May 1, 1967.
  - Reading: Yukio Mishima
  - Composition and Conductor: Naozumi Yamamoto (山本直純)
  - Poem: Akira Asano (浅野晃)
  - Performance: New Chamber Music Association
  - Jacket title lettering: Masahiro Yasuoka
  - ※Re-released by Nippon Columbia in December 1970.

== See also ==
- Honda Chikaatsu
- Japanese economic miracle
- Kijūrō Shidehara
- Ko-Shintō
- Wild Spirit
- Tomokiyo Yoshisane
- Ukehi

== Sources ==
- Mishima, Yukio (2002). 決定版 三島由紀夫全集 第20巻 短編小説6 [Definitive Edition Yukio Mishima Complete Works No.20 – Short Stories 6] (in Japanese). Shinchosha. ISBN 978-4-10-642560-8.
- Mishima, Yukio (2002). 決定版 三島由紀夫全集 第21巻 戯曲1 [Definitive Edition Yukio Mishima Complete Works No.21 – Dramas 6] (in Japanese). Shinchosha. ISBN 978-4-10-642561-5.
- Mishima, Yukio (2003). 決定版 三島由紀夫全集 第34巻 評論9 [Definitive Edition Yukio Mishima Complete Works No.34 – Criticisms 9] (in Japanese). Shinchosha. ISBN 978-4-10-642574-5.
- Mishima, Yukio (2003). 決定版 三島由紀夫全集 第35巻 評論10 [Definitive Edition Yukio Mishima Complete Works No.35 – Criticisms 10] (in Japanese). Shinchosha. ISBN 978-4-10-642575-2.
- Mishima, Yukio (2004). 決定版 三島由紀夫全集 第38巻 書簡 [Definitive Edition Yukio Mishima Complete Works No.38 – Letters] (in Japanese). Shinchosha. ISBN 978-4-10-642578-3.
- Mishima, Yukio (2004). 決定版 三島由紀夫全集 第39巻 対談1 [Definitive Edition Yukio Mishima Complete Works No.39 – Dialogues 1] (in Japanese). Shinchosha. ISBN 978-4-10-642579-0.
- Mishima, Yukio (2004). 決定版 三島由紀夫全集 第40巻 対談2 [Definitive Edition Yukio Mishima Complete Works No.40 – Dialogues 2] (in Japanese). Shinchosha. ISBN 978-4-10-642580-6.
- Mishima, Yukio (2004). 決定版 三島由紀夫全集 第41巻 音声(CD) [Definitive Edition Yukio Mishima Complete Works No.41 – Voices (CD)] (in Japanese). Shinchosha. ISBN 978-4-10-642581-3.
- Satō, Hideaki; Inoue, Takashi; Yamanaka, Takeshi, eds. (2005). 決定版 三島由紀夫全集 第42巻 年譜・書誌 [Definitive Edition Yukio Mishima Complete Works No.42 – Biographical Sketch and Bibliography] (in Japanese). Shinchosha. ISBN 978-4-10-642582-0.
- Mishima, Yukio (2005). Tanaka, Miyoko; Satō, Hideaki (eds.). 決定版 三島由紀夫全集 補巻 補遺・索引 [Definitive Edition Yukio Mishima Complete Works Supplementary Volume – Addenda, Indexes] (in Japanese). Shinchosha. ISBN 978-4-10-642583-7.
- Mishima, Yukio (2005) [1st pub. 1966]. 英霊の聲 オリジナル版 [Voices of the Fallen Heroes – Original Version]. Kawade Bunko (in Japanese) (Paperback ed.). Kawade Shobō Shinsha. ISBN 978-4-309-40771-5.
- Mishima, Yukio (2006) [1st pub. Shinchosha:1969]. 文化防衛論 [On the Defense of Culture]. Chikuma Bunko (in Japanese) (Paperback ed.). Chikuma Shobō. ISBN 978-4-480-42283-5.
- Mishima, Yukio (2025). Dodd, Stephan (ed.). Voices of the Fallen Heroes, and other stories. Translated by McCarthy, Paul; others. Introduced by John Nathan. Vintage Books. ISBN 978-0-593-80435-3.
- Akiyama, Shun; others (1990). 三島由紀夫 [Yukio Mishima]. Gunzo – Japanese Authors 18 (in Japanese). Shogakukan. ISBN 978-4-09-567018-8.
- Andō, Takeshi (1996). 三島由紀夫「日録」 ["Daily Record" of Yukio Mishima] (in Japanese). Michitani. ISBN 978-4-915841-39-2.
- Andō, Takeshi (1998). 三島由紀夫の生涯 [The Life of Yukio Mishima] (in Japanese). Natsume Shobo. ISBN 978-4-931391-39-0.
- Dōmoto, Masaki (2005). 回想 回転扉の三島由紀夫 [Reminiscence: The Revolving Door of Yukio Mishima]. Bunshun Shinsho 477 (in Japanese). Bungeishunjū. ISBN 978-4-16-660477-7.
- Etō, Jun (1989). 全文芸時評 上巻―昭和33年～46年 [All Literary Comments Vol.1: 1958 – 1971] (in Japanese). Shinchosha. ISBN 978-4103033073.
- Fukushima, Jurō (2005) [1st pub. Shinjinbutu Ōraisha:1975]. 再訂資料・三島由紀夫 [Re-Edition Document - Yukio Mishima] (in Japanese) (Enlarged ed.). Chobunsha. ISBN 978-4-88695-180-9.
- Hamasaki, Yōsuke (2025). 敗戦とトラウマ―次こそ「正しく」戦えるか [Defeat and Trauma: Will we be able to fight "rightly" next time?]. Criterion Series (in Japanese). Kijunsha. ISBN 978-4-8284-2751-5.
- Hasegawa, Izumi; Takeda, Katsuhiko, eds. (1976). 三島由紀夫事典 [Encyclopedia of Yukio Mishima] (in Japanese). Meiji Shoin. ISBN 978-4-625-40025-4. NCID BN01686605.
- Hashikawa, Bunzō (1998). Ōta, Kazunori (ed.). 三島由紀夫論集成 [Collection of Essays On Yukio Mishima] (in Japanese). Shinya Soshosha. ISBN 978-4-88032-226-1.
- Hirano, Keiichiro (2023). 三島由紀夫論 [An Essay on Yukio Mishima] (in Japanese). Shinchosha. ISBN 978-4-10-426010-2.
- Hiraoka, Azusa (1996) [1st pub. 1972]. 伜・三島由紀夫 [My Son – Yukio Mishima]. Bunshu Bunko (in Japanese) (Paperback ed.). Bungeishunjū. ISBN 978-4-16-716204-7.
- Kan, Takayuki (2018). 三島由紀夫と天皇 [Yukio Mishima and the Emperor]. Heibonsha Shinsho 896 (in Japanese). Heibonsha. ISBN 978-4-582-85896-9.
- Kōno, Tsukasa (1989) [1st pub. 1972]. 二・二六事件―獄中手記・遺書 [February 26 Incident: Prison Memo/Suicide Note] (in Japanese) (New Format ed.). Kawade Shobō Shinsha. ISBN 978-4-309-22161-8.
- Kōno, Tsukasa (1989) [1st pub. 1976]. 私の二・二六事件―弟の自決 [My Experience with the February 26 Incident: My Brother's Suicide]. Kawade Bunko (in Japanese) (Paperback ed.). Kawade Shobō Shinsha. ISBN 978-4-309-47152-5.
- Matsumoto, Ken'ichi (2005). 三島由紀夫の二・二六事件 [The February 26 Incident in Yukio Mishima]. Bunshun Shinsho (in Japanese). Bungeishunjū. ISBN 978-4-16-660475-3.
- Matsumoto, Ken'ichi (2011) [1st pub. The Mainichi Newspapers Co., Ltd.:2007]. 畏るべき昭和天皇 [The Fearsome Emperor Shōwa]. Shincho Bunko (in Japanese). Shinchosha. ISBN 978-4-10-128732-4.
- Matsumoto, Tōru; Satō, Hideaki; Inoue, Takashi, eds. (2000). 三島由紀夫事典 [Encyclopedia of Yukio Mishima] (in Japanese). Bensei Shuppan. ISBN 978-4-585-06018-5.
- Matsumoto, Tōru; Satō, Hideaki; Inoue, Takashi, eds. (2001). 三島由紀夫の時代 [The Times of Yukio Mishima]. Collection of Essays on Yukio Mishima I (in Japanese). Bensei Shuppan. ISBN 978-4-585-04041-5.
- Matsumoto, Tōru; Satō, Hideaki; Inoue, Takashi, eds. (2008). 三島由紀夫 金閣寺 〈三島由紀夫研究6〉 [Yukio Mishima, The Temple of the Golden Pavilion]. Research of Yukio Mishima 6 (in Japanese). Kanae Shobo. ISBN 978-4-907846-58-9.
- Morris, Ivan (2023) [1st pub. Chuokoron-sha:1981]. 高貴なる敗北―日本史の悲劇の英雄たち 下巻 [The Nobility of Failure: Tragic Heroes in Japanese History] (in Japanese). Vol. 2. Translated by Saitō, Kazuaki (New Format ed.). Keiei Kagaku Publ. ISBN 978-4-86769-004-8. - First original English book was published in 1975 by Secker and Warburg.
- Muramatsu, Eiko (2007). 三島由紀夫 追想のうた―女優として育てられて [Yukio Mishima – A Song of Remembrance: Raised as an Actress by Him] (in Japanese). Hankyu Communications. ISBN 978-4-484-07205-0.
- Muramatsu, Takeshi (1990). 三島由紀夫の世界 [The World of Yukio Mishima] (in Japanese). Shinchosha. ISBN 978-4-10-321402-1.
- Nathan, John (1975) [1st pub. Little, Brown and Company:1974]. Mishima: A Biography. Tut books. North Clarendon, Vermont: Tuttle Publishing. ISBN 978-4805304020.
  - Nathan, John (2000). Mishima: A Biography (New ed.). Boston, Massachusetts: Da Capo Press. ISBN 978-0-306-80977-4.
- Nathan, John (2000) [1st pub. 1976 (an out-of-print book)]. 新版 三島由紀夫─ある評伝 [New Edition – Mishima: A Biography] (in Japanese). Translated by Noguchi, Takehiko (New/Revised ed.). Shinchosha. ISBN 978-4-10-505702-2.
- Okuno, Takeo (2000) [1st pub. 1993]. 三島由紀夫伝説 [Legend of Yukio Mishima]. Shincho Bunko (in Japanese) (Revised/Paperback ed.). Shincho. ISBN 978-4-10-135602-0.
- Satake, Akihiro; Yamada, Hideo, eds. (2015). 万葉集（五） [Man'yōshū (5)]. Iwanami Bunko (in Japanese). Iwanami Shoten. ISBN 978-4-00-300058-8.
- Satō, Hideaki (2006). 三島由紀夫―人と文学 [Yukio Mishima: The Man and His Literature]. 100 Japanese Authors (in Japanese). Bensei Shuppan. ISBN 978-4-585-05184-8.
- Scott-Stokes, Henry (2000). The Life and Death of Yukio Mishima (Enlarged/Revised ed.). New York: Cooper Square Press. ISBN 978-0-8154-1074-4.
- Scott-Stokes, Henry (1985). 三島由紀夫─死と真実 [The Life and Death of Yukio Mishima] (in Japanese). Translated by Tokuoka, Takao. Diamond, Inc. ISBN 978-4-478-94056-3.
  - Scott-Stokes, Henry (1998). 三島由紀夫─生と死 [The Life and Death of Yukio Mishima] (in Japanese). Translated by Tokuoka, Takao (Enlarged/Revised ed.). Seiryu Publ. ISBN 978-4-916028-52-5.
- Shibusawa, Tatsuhiko (1986) [1st pub. Rippū Shobo:1983]. 三島由紀夫おぼえがき [Memorandum on Yukio Mishima]. Chuko Bunko (in Japanese) (Paperback ed.). Chuokoron-Shinsha. ISBN 978-4-12-201377-3.
- Shimauchi, Keiji (2010). 三島由紀夫―豊饒の海へ注ぐ [Yukio Mishima: Flows into The Sea of Fertility]. Minerva Japan Biography Selection (in Japanese). Minerva Shobo. ISBN 978-4-623-05912-6.
- Tasaka, Takashi (1977) [1st pub. 1970]. 増補 三島由紀夫論 [Supplement – An Essay on Yukio Mishima] (in Japanese) (Enlarged/Revised ed.). Futōsha. ISBN 978-4-89219-064-3.
- Tekina, Osamu (2020). 日本人は豚になる―三島由紀夫の予言 [The Japanese will Become Pigs: Yukio Mishima's Prophecies] (in Japanese). Bestsellers. ISBN 978-4-584-13973-8.
- Tomioka, Kōichirō (2020). 天皇論―江藤淳と三島由紀夫 [Their Essays on Emperor: Jun Etō and Yukio Mishima] (in Japanese). Bungeishunjū. ISBN 978-4-16-391209-7.
- Yamamoto, Kenkichi (1969). 文芸時評 [Literary Comments] (in Japanese). Kawade Shobō Shinsha. NCID BN07354404.
- 群像 1971年2月・特大号 三島由紀夫 死と芸術 [Gunzo – February 1971 Extra Large Issue – Yukio Mishima, His Death and Art] (in Japanese). Kodansha. 1971. ASIN B01NH2WT0X.
