= Reactions to the Mishima Incident =

25 November 1970 event in Japan

The Reactions to the Mishima Incident explains the main reactions to the Mishima Incident.

The afternoon immediately after the incident, the shocking news of the call for a coup and subsequent suicide by seppuku by the famous author, who was active in many fields and was also known as a candidate for the Nobel Prize in Literature, was broadcast simultaneously as breaking news on television and radio both in Japan and abroad. The evening newspapers of that day, and the morning papers of the following day, as well as special issues to weekly and monthly magazines, carried comments in response to the incident from political activists, cultural figures, and writers, critics, and other influential individuals. The phenomenon of most weekly magazines rushing to publish special issues and every monthly magazine running a "Mishima feature" was a first in the history of the Japanese media, people flocked to stores to buy these magazines and Mishima's works, all over Japan.

Out of the vast number of reactions to the Mishima Incident, this article brings together representative comments, specifically targeting those from the official trial records and those often quoted in literature regarding the incident and studies on Mishima. In 1970, 25 years from Japan’s defeat by the United States in the Pacific War of World War II—the concept of Japan's "postwar democracy" (戦後民主主義), intrinsically bound to the occupation policies of GHQ, was called into question from two distinct angles: by Mishima from a nationalist perspective, and by the New Left from an anti-American, anti-Anpo stance. This convergence exposed the deep-seated contradictions that had been quietly running beneath the surface of Japanese society. Behind the numerous statements made by intellectuals regarding the incident, one can discern subtle reactions to Mishima's fundamental question.

== Reactions ==
=== Politicians and business leaders ===
At a press conference held at the Defense Agency on the incident day, Minister of Defense Yasuhiro Nakasone called the incident "a very regrettable incident" and criticized Mishima's actions as "an enormous nuisance" and "destructive to democratic order." Prime Minister Eisaku Satō, who heard the news at the Prime Minister's Office, was also surrounded by reporters and commented, "I can only think that he has gone mad. This is out of the ordinary." However, Nakasone and Satō were mindful of public criticism regarding their remarks, and subsequently, they gradually altered their previous statements.

Also, the demand by the Socialists and Communists—who took a constitutionalist stance—to ban "militaristic" and "nationalistic" propaganda was ultimately the flip side of the same coin as the thinking of Nakasone and others in the LDP. Both shared the same fundamental mindset of casting aside anything that diverged from the social logic accepted by both the ruling and opposition parties within the framework of postwar democracy and rapid economic growth.

Taizō Ishizaka, the former chairman of Keidanren, stated that setting aside their methods, there was something deeply touching about the underlying sentiment of Mishima and his group, also he noted that while ritual suicide (seppuku) was an act he could absolutely never copy himself, it was certain that Mishima was not mad. Ishizaka then commented, "I, too, advocate for constitutional amendment, so I detest a foreign, translated constitution, even if it used the exact same phrasing. Since a constitution is the foundation of a country, it must be our own," and he further added that Mishima would leave his mark on history, and would be highly evaluated in years or decades to come.

=== Newspaper and magazine articles ===
The tone of the Japanese major newspapers on the Mishima incident - the Yomiuri Shimbun, the Asahi Shimbun, and the Mainichi Shimbun - was almost similar with the comments made by Minister of Defense Yasuhiro Nakasone and Prime Minister Eisaku Satō on the day, writing about Mishima's actions as an act of madness and that anti-democratic behavior was absolutely unacceptable.

An editorial in the Asahi Shimbun stated that what governed Mishima's actions was probably "his intense and unique aesthetic sense, rather than any political thinking," and criticized him, saying, "Even if we can understand his philosophy, his actions should never be condoned."

An editorial in the Mainichi Shimbun called the incident "nothing short of sheer madness," and concluded, "No matter how pure his ideas were and how valuable they may have been, anti-democratic behavior that does not follow legitimate rules is absolutely unacceptable." Telegraphs reporting reactions from cities outside Japan, reported by the Mainichi Shimbun, included "fears of a revival of militarism" from Washington, "concerns that it will provoke right-wingers" from London, and "shock at the actions of a well-known figure" from Paris.

Regarding reports from outside Japan, the following news commentary is introduced as representative within a publication that aggregates the Mishima Incident's trial records.

An editorial in the American The Christian Science Monitor stated, "It is difficult to see Mishima's suicide as a sign of the revival of Japanese militarism. Nevertheless, the meaning of Mishima's suicide is so significant that it corresponds careful consideration."

The British Financial Times stated, "Whether mad or sane, the role model he set will have a powerful influence on a small number of Japan's young people, now and for the future."

The German Die Welt reported that "he committed hara-kiri which martyring for the purity of his poetic spirit." French L'Express reported that "He committed seppuku, calling for Japan's current worrying state to be restored to its former state." Le Monde stated that "Mishima's suicide was for an indictment of hypocrisy."

The Italian Il Tempo mourned Mishima, and compared Mishima's suicide to that of the ancient Romans, saying, "Through the numerous images of suicides, we cannot help but be reminded of the truth that ancient Rome still lives on in our hearts," "Because of their love of life, the ancient Romans took their own lives." referring to Cato's suicide by seppuku. It also mentioned that Mussolini donated a monument to the Aizu Byakkotai's suicide to Iimori Mountain, and the actions of D'Annunzio who Mishima admired.

The Australian Financial Review stated that "To link Mishima's death to the ultra-nationalism and the organized crime group (group of yakuza) (暴力団, bōryokudan) that are common in Japan is not just a misunderstanding of Mishima, but a misunderstanding of modern Japan as well," and that "the tragedy that led to his death, in which he pursued true beauty in the structural conflict between traditional Japanese culture and modern society, is constructed to a level of perfection, just like his own works."

According to Takehiko Noguchi (野口武彦), an intellectual history researcher and a pioneer of Mishima studies, who was in Massachusetts when the Mishima Incident occurred, the reaction in the Massachusetts local newspapers was largely one of deride as an act of "madness," because of the prevalence of psychoanalysis in nature of the locality, and even university scholars who were known to be knowledgeable about Japan, tended to talk about the meaning of Mishima's death solely as a "psychological abnormality" or "pathological problem," like the general public, to separate it from any social context. About that Noguchi has said that he felt it was different from the Japanese habit of relating the meaning of the suicide of others to the living side. (Note: Noguchi has inferred that this tendency in there may have been related to their view that suicide as a crime, and has said that but in any case, he felt that the fact that Mishima's death was never considered a "problem of the logic of human life" was different from the Japanese habit of relating the meaning of the suicide of others to the living side.)

In public opinion on the Mishima incident in various media at the time, such as Japanese television and weekly magazines, ranged from "the desperate act of a patriot" to "counterrevolutionary terrorism," and those who refused to engage in such evaluation from the start or were bored with it commented him as having "reached his limits as a writer" or "the completion of Mishima's aesthetics," while the even more lazy ones preached the "madness" theory, desperately trying to place him outside the realm of everyday social norms, some tried to link Mishima's homosexuality to the incident.

=== CIA ===
On November 27, two days after Mishima's suicide, the US Central Intelligence Agency (CIA) wrote a secret report predicted, "Yukio Mishima has committed a fierce suicide. Although the right-wing forces in Japan are small, Mishima will be their first martyr since the war," and continued with as follows: This report was made first public in August 2003.

As fears of a revival of Japanese militarism grow in Asia, the government seems to be trying in every way to downplay the significance of Mishima's dramatic act. Prime Minister Satō was quick to condemn Mishima's suicide, calling it "I can only think that he has gone mad," and the media seemed to support this view. The government plans to be more vigilant against a variety of small but unpredictable far-right groups. These right-wingers may be inspired by Mishima's suicide to commit violent acts, but the political influence of the far-right in Japan is limited, so the main threat foreseen in the future seems to be limited acts of terrorism or suicide.

— CIA, Report on November 27, 1970

Mishima researcher Takashi Inoue (井上隆史), who quoted the text above, has noted that the CIA, having constantly researched Japan's political landscape, possessed an accurate understanding of the situation following the incident, and had foreseen that post-war Japanese society would fail to take Mishima's message to heart.

=== JSDF and Ministry of Defense ===
On November 26, the day after the incident, a bouquet of chrysanthemums was quietly placed in front of the Commandant General's office, but within an hour it was removed by senior officers.

After the incident, a survey (randomly selected 1,000 people) was conducted among the Ground Self-Defense Forces in Tokyo and its suburbs, and the majority of personnel answered that they sympathized with the ideas in the Geki. Some also answered that they "strongly sympathized with it," causing a fluster at the Ministry of Defense.

Former Maritime Chief of Staff Tomoharu Nishimura (西村友晴) remarked that as the full details of Mishima's resolve and motives became clear following the incident, JSDF personnel increasingly sought to comprehend the underlying spirit of their cause.

When the police questioned young senior officers of the JGSDF who had been on friendly terms with Mishima, they found that more of them than expected sympathized with Mishima and were seriously thinking about Japan's defense issues. Colonel Kiyokatsu Yamamoto (山本舜勝), who had lectured Mishima and the members of Tatenokai on guerrilla tactics, was also questioned, but because the police authorities decided to treat the incident as simply a case of mob intrusion, Colonel Yamamoto was not called to court. (Note: Three years after the Mishima Incident, Kiyokatsu Yamamoto, who had become an advisor to a certain company in Ichigaya, was visited by Hiroshi Mochimaru (持丸博), a former Tatenokai member, who said to him, "Mr. Yamamoto, whether this is right or wrong, it is possible that Mr. Mishima committed such an act because he was provoked by you." Yamamoto, looking down, replied, "I have a bad sleep. Now I am consoling Mr. Mishima's spirit and living a life immersed in haiku.")

On December 22, the Lieutenant General Kanetoshi Mashita (益田兼利), Commander-in-Chief of the Eastern Army, took full responsibility for the incident and resigned from his post. When the process of this decision, General Mashita and the Minister of Defense Yasuhiro Nakasone negotiated. According to Major Katsumi Terao (寺尾克美), one of the injured persons of the Mishima Incident, the tape recording of that time shows Nakasone saying, "I have a future. The Commander-in-Chief has reached the pinnacle of rank, so if you take full responsibility, the matter will be closed," and "I'll raise the Commander-in-Chief of the Eastern Army's salary by two pay grades..." (meaning to increase the base amount for calculating retirement benefits and increase retirement benefits). (Note: Major Katsumi Terao has said that when he heard Nakasone's words on this tape, "I was boiling with anger", and was dismayed to see that Nakasone, whom he had previously respected, "was this kind of man in reality.")

One years after the incident, a memorial monument was quietly erected in front of the 2nd company corps at the Camp Takigahara of the Japan Ground Self-Defense Force Fuji School (陸上自衛隊富士学校) in Camp Fuji, where the Mishima and the Tatenokai enlisted for a trial period. Inscribed on the monument is a tanka poem by Mishima:

深き夜に 暁告ぐる くたかけの 若きを率てぞ 越ゆる峯々

(Fukaki yo ni Akatsuki tuguru Kutakake no Wakaki wo hikite zo Koyuru Minemine)

In the deep night, / A rooster cry out / To announce of dawn, / I lead my young men / Across the mountains.
— 公威 (Kimitake)

Masamichi Inoki (猪木正道), the third president of the National Defense Academy of Japan, who had once dialogued about the Anpo problem with Mishima in 1969, criticized as regards Mishima's Geki, saying, "It is an unruly ideology that intend to transforming the JSDF's Public Security Operation for protect public order, into a coup d'état to destroy public order, and there is no other way of thinking that is more insulting to the JSDF." in 1972, two years after the incident.

In the fall of 1973, three years after the incident, the Ministry of Defense's internal bureau (内局, nai-kyoku) added the phrase "comply with the Constitution of Japan and laws and regulations." to the oath of office for JSDF personnel. Until then, this phrase had only been included in the oath of office for general national civil servants (国家公務員, kokka kōmuin) (police officers, etc.), and there had been hesitation to include "comply with the Constitution of Japan" in the oath of office for the JSDF personnel, because a straight reading of Article 9 of the Japanese Constitution would make it to interpret the existence of the JSDF as "Unconstitutional". However, the Mishima Incident made it clear that the JSDF were a completely harmless safe organization, and it was judged that not a single officer would rebel if this wording was included, so it was decided to insert it.

=== New Left ===
A New Left group Zenkyōtō of Tokyo University, which had held a debate with Mishima in May 1969 (Debate: Yukio Mishima vs. Zenkyōtō of Tokyo University: Beauty, Community, and the Tokyo University Struggle (討論 三島由紀夫vs.東大全共闘―美と共同体と東大闘争)), expressed their condolences with a banner reading "In Memory of Yukio Mishima" at the Komaba campus, and Kyoto University and other schools also paid tribute with banners reading "In Memory of Yukio Mishima's Seppuku."

Osamu Takita (滝田修), leader of the Kyoto University Partisan group (京大パルチザン), commented, "It was an ideological defeat for us leftists. We didn't have a single person who was willing to put his body on the line like that. It was a shock. The New Left needs to create many more 'Mishimas'." Takita's statement represented the typical sentiment of New Left activists toward Mishima's death at the time.

However, there were subtle differences between the New Left and Mishima in how they viewed dying. An executive staff of a leading New Left faction emphasized the difference between Mishima and himself, saying, "We go with the 'philosophy of life' as opposed to Mishima's 'aesthetics of death.' It's not that you can accomplish anything by dying. But it's not that we avoid dying. When we die, we die by being killed."

Chiren Misawa (見沢知廉), a New Leftist, moved by the Mishima Incident, when he told his feeling to a senior members of the leadership team, he was retorted, "That was a farce." He became angry and thought, "How can they call something that people risked their lives a farce? They don't understand the human heart." Disappointed in his leaders, he became New Rightist. (Note: At the time, there was an atmosphere of mutual rejection on both the left and the right, and it was difficult to be free, with people thinking things like, "I'm left-wing, so I shouldn't be sympathize with Mishima," or, "I'm actually anti-American, but I'm right-wing so I shouldn't be oppose the anpo." However, like Chiren Misawa, the Mishima Incident prompted some people to join the New Right.)

According to Tomofusa Kure (呉智英), a critic, who had participated in the activities of the Zenkyōtō at the time, some left-wing people, shocked to Mishima and four members of the Tatenokai's "seriousness", described it using words like "eerie," "ugly," and "fear."

=== Right Wing ===
Tomeo Sagōya (佐郷屋留雄) considered the actions of Mishima and the Tatenokai to be a "righteous deed" (義挙, gikyo), commenting that it "opened the eyes of the Japanese people and opened a breakthrough for the Japanese restoration movement." Michio Asanuma (浅沼美智雄) also praised Mishima's actions and Geki, saying that "the sincerity of patriotism that runs through the Geki is the very sanity of the nation."

The Greater Japan Productive Party (大日本生産党) stated that it "cannot accept in any way" the comments made by Minister of Defense Nakasone and Prime Minister Satō, and harshly criticized the Liberal Democratic Party for abandoning its goal of "Constitutional amendment" despite the party's platform explicitly stating that it has done so and for "consistently resting on its laurels in power since the end of the war, and had been preoccupied with partisan interests." They also condemned the party, saying, "The party that is responsible for driving Mishima to his death lies none other than the government, the LDP."

=== Writers and Cultural figures ===
Among the various reactions to the Mishima Incident, those from writers and cultural figures were the most numerous, reaching a vast number; below are some of the ones most commonly quoted in Mishima-related books.

Many of Mishima's close friends and writers and critics who shared the same ideological lineage interpreted the Mishima Incident as a committing "suicide of remonstrance" (諌死, kanshi) to the government. Writers with different ideological leanings from Mishima also felt a deep respect for Mishima's integrity to provide fair literary criticism that transcended ideological differences, and many of them, like Yasunari Kawabata's comment at the scene, expressed pure lamentation over the loss of Mishima's rare talent, also many of them, sympathized with Mishima's accomplishment of his romanticism and aesthetics.

On the other hand, there were also critics such as Munemutsu Yamada (山田宗睦) person, who based on their ideological opposition and anti-Emperor stance, harshly criticized Mishima's actions as an "Anachronistic folly". There were also many critical comments reflecting the general opinion of "postwar cultural figures (戦後文化人)" at the time, such as Hiroshi Noma, who was wary of Japan becoming militarized. There were also those, such as Ryōtarō Shiba and Shō Shibata (柴田翔) mentioned below, who rejected the idea of imitating Mishima by taking their own lives.

Ryōtarō Shiba feared that "dingy imitators" would emerge who would copy Mishima's actions, and was opposed to giving Mishima's death any political significance, arguing that it should remain within the category of literary theory. He also considered the mass sense of the JSDF personnel who heckled Mishima to be normal and healthy. (Note: However, in his later years, Ryōtarō Shiba, began to lament and worry about the money worship of materialism and deterioration of ethics among Japanese people from the economic bubble period through to the Heisei era, like the prediction words of Mishima.)

Shō Shibata, who had shown respect to Mishima while he was alive and had approached him calling him "Teacher Mishima" (三島先生, Mishima Sensei), drastically changing his attitude after the incident, and said, "I intuitively sensed his narcissism and it made me angry." And to the New Left youths who were likely to be influenced by Mishima, Shibata added that they should carefully think over which mattered more: "self-destruction based on a philosophy of death" or "continuing to live as a human being."

Takeshi Muramatsu (村松剛), a scholar of French literature who was close to Mishima, said that Mishima, who had achieved status as a writer and had been blessed with a family, and who would have had a great chance of winning the Nobel Prize in Literature if he had lived, decided to cut all that off and act in this way as the meaning of "a warning to the flourishing mid-Shōwa period (昭和元禄, Shōwa-Genroku) with his death."

Fusao Hayashi viewed Mishima's death as an act of "suicide of remonstrance" (諌死, kanshi), in which Mishima urged the JSDF to reflect on themselves and return to their original, rightful status as an "honorable national military." He referenced a 1966 dialogue with Mishima, where Mishima remarked that politicians only realize what poets and literature foresee decades after the fact. Hayashi then commemorated the self-sacrifice of Mishima and Morita as an effective act designed to snap the "mentally elderly" out of their complacency—those who rest comfortably on the big lies of an "economic superpower" and a "peace constitution," while turning a Japan that ought to be beautiful into a hideous den of "economic animals" and "free riders" and driving it toward the brink of ruin—thereby seeking to halt Japan's collapse.

Seiichi Funahashi mourned Mishima's death as a "death of indignation" (憤死, funshi) and said of the meaning of his death, "I think this way. 'The extreme of expressive power leads to death.' No matter how much he tries to express himself, when his expressive power is blocked by a thick wall, he has no choice but to throw away his pen and die."

Mori Mari, daughter of the renowned author Mori Ōgai, was infuriated by the remarks of Prime Minister Eisaku Satō and Minister of Defense Yasuhiro Nakasone. She declared, "The Prime Minister and the Minister of Defense call Yukio Mishima's suicide an act of madness, but I would like to ask: which one is truly mad?" She then addressed the state of post-war Japan—a country unable to maintain its own dignity, untreated as a full-fledged nation, denied respect in any negotiation, (Note: Mishima's Geki has cited the "Washington Naval Treaty," the "Treaty on the Non-Proliferation of Nuclear Weapons," and the "Japan-US textile negotiations" (日米繊維交渉) as examples of unequal treaties that Japan was forced to accept.) reduced to a de facto vassal state of the United States, and effectively existing as no real nation at all—stating:

Between the person who grieves in righteous indignation over the ludicrous state of the Japanese people, and the person who accepts such a condition with dull sensibilities and a nonchalant smile—which one is truly insane? I simply cannot fathom that the sensibility able to remain unbothered by the current state of Japan is that of a normal human being.

— Mari Mori, Which one is the Madman?

Shigeharu Nakano criticized those who tried to frame Mishima's actions as "madness" as brazen. Furthermore, he stated that "Satō and Nakasone seized this event by the forelock," expressing his fury that by dismissing the Mishima Incident as "madness," they exploited it as a chance to project an image of the Self-Defense Forces as a rational and non-violent organization in line with public common sense.

Hideo Kobayashi objected to the fact that, despite partisan labels like "right-winger" having absolutely no relevance to Mishima's spirit, the language framed around his death was reduced to "materialistic" terms like "right-wing," causing his death to be treated as if it were a mere accident. He voiced sharp criticism toward those who dispensed various "explanations" to condemn Mishima, noting that it was not easy for them to "apprehend and directly perceive the event as an abstract phenomenon." Furthermore, Kobayashi argued that it was only natural for Mishima's death to be deeply intertwined with issues of Japanese history and tradition. He emphasized that the symbolic weight of the incident was "something forged by the unique historical experience that this man of letters bore responsibility for all on his own," adding that if this were not the case, it could never possess such power to move the heart of someone like himself, who was both an outsider and a solitary soul.

Ichirō Murakami (村上一郎), a poet and literary critic, who was also briefly a member of the Japanese Communist Party, criticizing those who claimed that the deaths of Mishima and Morita were meaningless or died in vain, introduced a collection of waka poems he had received from an acquaintance, asserting: "Listen carefully, you lot who call it a wasted death, a dog's death! Moved by the heroic spirit of these two men, a groundswell of poems with this very soul of righteousness is coming into being one after another." He argued against their claims by declaring, "How could this possibly be a dog's death?", pointing to the potential of this emerging poetic wave to connect with the rich cultural lineage of anthologies like the Man'yōshū and Shin Kokin Wakashū. Then, five years after Mishima's passing, as if following in his footsteps, Murakami took his own life by cutting his carotid artery with a Japanese sword.

Bunzō Hashikawa (橋川文三), an intellectual historian and researcher of the Japan Romantic School (日本浪曼派, Nihon Rōman-ha), based on Mishima's psychological history from before the war, and associated the Mishima's "foolishly honest" death with the historical tradition of "Death in Madness" such as that of Hikokurō Taakayama, Shinpuren, Yasutake Yokoyama (横山安武) who was a Samurai of the Satsuma Domain, Saburō Aizawa, and also positioning the "Death in Madness" of Mishima to the same place such as that of "obscure terrorists" like Heigo Asahi (朝日平吾) who assassinated Zenjirō Yasuda and committed suicide on the spot, and Konichi Nakaoka (中岡艮一) who assassinated Takashi Hara.

Yojurō Yasuda (保田與重郎), the leader of the Japan Romantic School, which had some influence on Mishima in his youth, commented, "The fact that young Morita's blade hesitated several times is proof of the beauty of his heart. It makes me even more sad because I feel he was a kind person." He also commented that Mishima poured all his soul into meticulous arrangements—not to kill others, but to bring about his own death—and in doing so, rocked a massive system to its foundations without taking a life.

Hideo Nakai (中井英夫), who was close to Mishima, criticized the trend of hastily dismissing Mishima's death as the act of a lunatic, as well as those who viewed homosexuality—a central theme chosen for Mishima's literature—through a purely sensationalist lens, trivializing it with slurs like "homo" or "agfay (オカマ, okama)." Instead, Nakai asserted that "the one who died was neither a pop singer nor a movie star, but a writer who brought forth the richest, most fragrant fruit of the postwar period." He then lamented an era dominated by people whose "coarse sensibilities and shallow thinking" allowed them to glibly reduce the inner motivations behind Mishima's actions to nothing more than "a reverse side of an inferiority complex."

Yumiko Kurahashi criticized that in response to writers who say that Mishima could have done better work if he had lived longer, or that he had reached a dead end in his literary work and resorted to the actions he did, they speak as if being writers or literary figures gave them some special qualification or existence (as if everything existed for the sake of literature), and said that she could well understand "Mishima's deep disgust at associating with his peers." And Kurahashi asserted that their comments regarding Mishima's death betrayed a "petty stinginess akin to mourning the death of the goose that lays the golden eggs." She deemed the notion that the growth of Mishima's body of work equated to an increase in Japan's cultural heritage "vulgar," criticizing those who failed to realize that the action Mishima demonstrated through his deed was Japanese culture itself.

Although Kazumi Takahashi, occupied a different ideological stance from Mishima, he remarked, "The death of a valiant enemy is far sad more than the death of an evil ally." Drawing upon the words describing the overwhelming grief of Confucius when he learned that his disciple Zhong You had been killed and his body minced into salt (shiokara), Takahashi offered his condolences, saying: "If Yukio Mishima’s spirit has ears to hear, then listen: Kazumi Takahashi is 'weeping, knocking over the jars of shiokara' (醢をくつがえして哭いている, Shiokara wo kutsugaeshite naite iru)". (Note: The phrase 醢をくつがえして哭いている (Shiokara wo kutsugaeshite naite iru) comes from a legend that when Confucius informed that his disciple Zhong You had been killed, cut up and turned into a shiokara, he wept and flung away all home shiokara. Kazumi Takahashi used the phrase as a metaphor for grief of losing a brave defeated warrior whom he respects.)

Taijun Takeda commented, "Mishima and I had different writing styles and opposing political views, but I have never once doubted the purity of his motives." and continued:

A life of hard work and dedication without a moment to breathe has come to an end. The dust kicked up by his lonely body and soul of a long-distance runner, and his breathing soar high, and fall down above our heads. These are your patience, your determination, your hatred, your love, and, your howling laughter, your silence. These float between us, holding us down. It is something moral, rather than aesthetic. When you announced your Lectures on Immoral Education (不道徳教育講座, Fudōtoku kyōiku kōza), I had an intuition that "there is no way such an earnest, hard-working person could become immoral." I am thinking that you were born with the innate ability to believe that a life lived without morality is not a life at all. "Morality" was constantly trying to bind you, like pushing aside the "beauty" that tried to make you ecstatic.

— Taijun Takeda, After the Death of Mr. Yukio Mishima

Jun Ishikawa expressed that the decisive factor in Mishima's decision was that he learned Kenjutsu while holding strong ideals as a samurai, and that he adopted the action philosophy of Yangmingism, the root of "active nihilism" (能動的ニヒリズム, nōdōteki nihirizumu), (a philosophy of action based on the idea of returning to the "great void (heavens, sky)" (太虚, taikyo), the source of all creation, through the "unity of knowledge and action" (知行合一, chikou-gouitsu)). Also, Ishikawa, unlike Mishima, talked that he did not believe that Emperor-centrism was "absolutely unchanging," but he lamented that the place where Mishima's "nihilism" in his "jar (壺, tsubo) overflowing with the water of life" (flesh) took flight into the "Great void" was the "rooftop of a government office" where "salarymen" and not "samurai" hung out, and he expressed that "there is no doubt that the incident was an incident of Japanese spirit" even if there was a disconnection between the rooftop and the area below.

Takaaki Yoshimoto, as someone of the same generation who lived through both the wartime and post-war eras alongside Mishima, spoke of the shock of the incident as a self-interrogation:

Yukio Mishima's dramatic death by hara-kiri and decapitation by a second: this is a shock. This method of suicide possesses a sheer force capable of making everyone who is left alive look somewhat foolish. What gives color to this shock is a strange amalgam: the terrifying intensity of this method of suicide; his tragic Geki and the pitifully cheapness of his death poems; the misguided foolishness of it as a political act; and the grandstand, "cool calculation" evident in how he arranged the process leading up to his suicide to be broadcast on television cameras for the mass audience (大向う, ohmukou), in advance. And the question remains with me, just as it has for the past few years regarding Yukio Mishima: "How serious is he really?" In other words, he has died at the very point that is hardest for me to understand. To this question, only the terrifying intensity of Mishima's method of suicide serves as an answer. And for a moment, this answer possesses the force to bear down on me, asking: "What on earth have you been doing!?"

— Takaaki Yoshimoto, Comments on the Situation: Provisional Memo

Yasunari Kawabata, reflecting on his past experiences of losing many close friends and acquaintances—including Teppei Kataoka (片岡鉄兵)—noted how he had often felt that the only way to escape the sorrow of losing such comrades was to die himself. Deeply grieving the death of Mishima, who was so much younger than he, Kawabata expressed sorrowful regret: though he had not felt a strong personal resonance with the Tatenokai, he wondered whether he ought to have drawn closer and engaged more deeply with the group if it might have dissuaded Mishima from his fate. He then paid tribute to Mishima as follows:

And yet, I find that the writers I felt affectionate most and deeply revered are often the very ones who elude my full understanding. Such was the case for me with the literature of Riichi Yokomitsu-kun. Ever since Mishima-kun's death, I cannot help but be reminded of Yokomitsu-kun. I do not mean to suggest that the tragedies or thoughts of these two genius writers resemble one another. Rather, it is because Yokomitsu-kun was my peer and an irreplaceable master-friend (師友, shiyu), while Mishima-kun was my junior and an irreplaceable master-friend. I wonder if, after losing these two, I will ever meet such living master-friends again in my lifetime.'"

— Yasunari Kawabata, Yukio Mishima

Kawabata's suicide, coming about a year and a half after the incident, is believed to have been influenced by the profound shock he felt over Mishima's death.

Tatsuhiko Shibusawa, in mourning Mishima as a respect person, stated that Mishima was "an extremist in pursuit of the Absolute, without no limitations such as right or left," that his final act was "climbing the ladder of the Absolute and diving straight into the dizzying void," and that his death "stand tall with the brilliance of a pitch-black ore in the lukewarm waters of this prosperity." Also he cited "Active nihilism," as well as "Moral masochism" in which they torment and are sanctified through loyalty to the Absolute, like as Christian saint, Saint Sebastian, as reasons why Mishima needed a romantic "Absolute."

Kōichi Isoda (磯田光一), a literary critic, stated the Mishima Incident as an act committed with full awareness of the torrent of abuse and criticism that would be heaped upon him after death, defining it as a "thorough revenge against the post-war reality that had lost its stoicism." For Mishima, Isoda posited that the Emperor was "something that must exist precisely because it cannot exist"—an ultimate vision summoned by his craving for the Absolute.

Donald Keene said, "I know that Prime Minister Satō was wrong to call Mishima's actions madness. They were logically constructed and inevitable," and "The world has lost a great writer."

Henry Scott-Stokes noted that Mishima’s courageous decision to bring all the national defense and political debates—which Liberal Democratic Party leaders had previously discussed only in private—out into "the public arena" was noteworthy, regarding Mishima as "the most important figure among the Japanese." He pointed out the lack of urgency in postwar Japan, a nation brought under U.S. dominance, where national defense issues were discussed "as if playing a game of cards or poker." Furthermore, he observed that despite Japan's outward appearance of having postwar democracy and freedom of speech, the reality was quite different, stating that "Mishima drew attention to the lack of realism in Japan's fundamental political debates, as well as the peculiar nature of Japanese democratic principles."

When Edward Seidensticker was asked by newspaper reporters whether Mishima's actions had anything to do with the resurgence of Japanese militarism, he intuitively answered "No" and commented as follows:

Maybe one day, when the country of Japan has grown tired of peace, of gross national product, of all that, he will be looked upon as the guardian god of a new national consciousness. We can now see that he told us very early what he intended to do, and that he achieved it. In a sense, Mishima's life was a Schweitzer-like one.

— Edward Seidensticker, None title (Current affairs commentary)

Henry Miller stated that he did not believe Mishima's suicide was the result of his fanaticism. And he mentioned that he was intrigued by the fact that Mishima, a writer who had a strong interest in Western culture and thought and consciously adopted them, "devoted himself to defending Japan's unique traditions," and has expressed the view that the meaning of Mishima's death was "to awaken the Japanese people and direct their eyes to the beauty and effectiveness inherent in the traditional lifestyle of their homeland," and that Mishima sacrificed everything to save his country. Also he stated, "Was there anyone in Japan who could sense more keenly than Mishima the various dangers facing Japan, which is following Western thought?" and that Mishima had a "spirit of refusal to submit" to Western "progressivism," in which ultimately awaited mass destructive death, "the death of the whole earth."

André Pieyre de Mandiargues remarked that Mishima remained the only one who left us a real example of pursuing his idea of the "absolute" to the absolute extreme, all the way to blood and death.

Yumi Arai, who happened to be visiting Happy End's music agency in Ichigaya on the day of the incident, stated that she saw Mishima delivering his speech on the balcony from there. Takashi Matsumoto, a member of Happy End at the time, was also deeply shocked by Mishima's death. Both reflected that the event made them realize the late-1960s movement had come to an end, speaking of how it served as the catalyst for their transition into becoming a singer-songwriter and a lyricist.

=== Emperor Shōwa ===
It is clear from the Irie Sukemasa Diary (入江相政日記) that Emperor Shōwa was informed of the Mishima incident by Grand Chamberlain (侍従長, Jijūchō) Sukemasa Irie at 1:40 pm, and it is recorded that the Emperor himself brought up Mishima during a conversation with Irie the following day. Although the details of what was said are not clear, it can be inferred that Emperor Shōwa was concerned about the incident. However, after the incident, Emperor Shōwa never mentioned Mishima's name in any official setting.

=== Others ===
After the Mishima incident, there were newspaper articles about several high school students and young men who followed in his footsteps and committed suicide. On September 9 of the following year, 1971, the Mainichi Shimbun reported that a high school student in Hachiōji-shi, had poured gasoline over himself and set himself on fire in the schoolyard, carrying two of Mishima's books. It is said that there were a considerable number of people who followed Mishima and committed seppuku.

In the case of the "murder of a Hirosaki University professor's wife" (弘前大教授夫人殺し事件) that occurred in 1949, the real culprit was inspired and reformed himself by the Mishima Incident, and came forward to the police in 1971. As a result, a man who had been serving a prison sentence on a false charge was later acquitted in a retrial.

Naoki Inose, who was a New Left student activist at Shinshu University, came to Tokyo after the Anpo protests, and started a temporary staffing business through an acquaintance to take on the final stages of cleaning and tidying up building construction sites. According to Inose, around 1972, he worked for a few days in a lumber warehouse along the Sumida River with S, a quiet hippie who had come to him in response to a part-time job advertisement. One day, during a conversation after lunch, Inose was asked by S, "What do you think of Yukio Mishima?" Inose was somewhat knowledgeable about the prewar Japanese Romantic School, and S seemed to have started the conversation with a sense of familiarity. And S began to talk like to himself, saying in a low voice, "Mishima is amazing, cause, he died," and "He really did it." After that, there was a series of corporate bombings, starting with the Mitsubishi Heavy Industries bombing in 1974. The photographs and profiles of the arrested members of the East Asia Anti-Japan Armed Front were published in the newspapers, and Inose was surprised to see S among them. S (Nodoka Saitō (齋藤和)) was the only member who committed suicide by taking potassium cyanide just before being arrested. Inose has interpreted S's suicide as being influenced by Mishima.

== Sources ==
- Mishima, Yukio (2003). 決定版 三島由紀夫全集 第29巻 評論4 [Definitive Edition Yukio Mishima Complete Works No.29 – Criticisms 4] (in Japanese). Shinchosha. ISBN 978-4-10-642569-1.
- Mishima, Yukio (2003). 決定版 三島由紀夫全集 第36巻 評論11 [Definitive Edition Yukio Mishima Complete Works No.36 – Criticisms 11] (in Japanese). Shinchosha. ISBN 978-4-10-642576-9.
- Mishima, Yukio (2005). Tanaka, Miyoko; Satō, Hideaki (eds.). 決定版 三島由紀夫全集 補巻 補遺・索引 [Definitive Edition Yukio Mishima Complete Works Supplementary Volume – Addenda, Indexes] (in Japanese). Shinchosha. ISBN 978-4-10-642583-7.
- Mishima, Yukio (1974) [1st pub. 1970]. 行動学入門 [Introductions to the Philosophy of Action]. Bunshun Bunko (in Japanese) (Paperback ed.). Bungeishunjū. ISBN 978-4-16-712401-4.
- Mishima, Yukio (2016). 古典文学読本 [Reader in Classical Literature]. Chuko Bunko (in Japanese) (Paperback ed.). Chuokoron-Shinsha. ISBN 978-4-12-206323-5.
- Akiyama, Shun; others (1990). 三島由紀夫 [Yukio Mishima]. Gunzo – Japanese Authors 18 (in Japanese). Shogakukan. ISBN 978-4-09-567018-8.
- Andō, Takeshi (1996). 三島由紀夫「日録」 ["Daily Record" of Yukio Mishima] (in Japanese). Michitani. ISBN 978-4-915841-39-2.
- Andō, Takeshi (1998). 三島由紀夫の生涯 [The Life of Yukio Mishima] (in Japanese). Natsume Shobo. ISBN 978-4-931391-39-0.
- Chujō, Shōhei, ed. (2005). 三島由紀夫が死んだ日―あの日、何が終り何が始まったのか [The Day Yukio Mishima Died: What Ended and What Began on That Day] (in Japanese). Jitsugyo no Nihon Sha. ISBN 978-4-408-53472-5.
- Chujō, Shōhei, ed. (2005). 続・三島由紀夫が死んだ日―あの日は、どうしていまも生々しいのか [Sequel - The Day Yukio Mishima Died: Why is That Day Still So Vivid to Us] (in Japanese). Jitsugyo no Nihon Sha. ISBN 978-4-408-53482-4.
- Date, Munekatsu (1972). 裁判記録「三島由紀夫事件」 [Judicial Record of the "Mishima Incident"] (in Japanese). Kodansha. NCID BN0140450X.
- Fukushima, Jurō (2005) [1st pub. Shinjinbutu Ōraisha:1975]. 再訂資料・三島由紀夫 [Re-Edition Document - Yukio Mishima] (in Japanese) (Enlarged ed.). Chobunsha. ISBN 978-4-88695-180-9.
- Hasegawa, Izumi; Takeda, Katsuhiko, eds. (1976). 三島由紀夫事典 [Encyclopedia of Yukio Mishima] (in Japanese). Meiji Shoin. ISBN 978-4-625-40025-4. NCID BN01686605.
- Hashikawa, Bunzō (1998). Ōta, Kazunori (ed.). 三島由紀夫論集成 [Collection of Essays On Yukio Mishima] (in Japanese). Shinya Soshosha. ISBN 978-4-88032-226-1.
- Hayashi, Fusao (1972). 悲しみの琴―三島由紀夫への鎮魂歌 [The Harp of Sorrows: Requiem for Yukio Mishima] (in Japanese). Bungeishunjū. NCID BN08146344.
- Hiraoka, Azusa (1996) [1st pub. 1972]. 伜・三島由紀夫 [My Son – Yukio Mishima]. Bunshu Bunko (in Japanese) (Paperback ed.). Bungeishunjū. ISBN 978-4-16-716204-7.
- Hori, Yukio (1993) [1st pub. 1983]. 戦後の右翼勢力 [Right-wing Forces of Postwar] (in Japanese) (Enlarged ed.). Keiso Shobo. ISBN 978-4-326-35040-7.
- Hosaka, Masayasu (2001) [1st pub. Kodansha:1980]. 三島由紀夫と楯の会事件 [Yukio Mishima and the Tatenokai Incident]. Kadokawa Bunko (in Japanese) (Enlarged/Revised ed.). Kadokawa Shoten. ISBN 978-4-04-355602-1.
- Inoki, Masamichi (1985). 猪木正道著作集 ５―国を守る [Collection of Masamichi Inoki Works No.5 – Defend the Country] (in Japanese). Rikitomi Shobo. ISBN 978-4-89776-705-5.
- Inoue, Takashi (2020). 暴流の人 三島由紀夫 [The Man of Turbulent Current: Yukio Mishima] (in Japanese). Heibonsha. ISBN 978-4-582-83844-2.
- Inoue, Yasumasa (2011). 冤罪の軌跡―弘前大学教授夫人殺害事件 [Trajectory of a False Charge: Hirosaki University Professor's Wife Murder Case]. Shincho Shinsho 402 (in Japanese). Shinchosha. ISBN 978-4-10-610402-2.
- Ishikawa, Jun (1990). 石川淳全集 第15巻 評論・随筆 [Jun Ishikawa Complete Works No.15 – Criticisms and Essays] (in Japanese). Chikuma Shobō. ISBN 978-4-480-70315-6.
- Isoda, Kōichi (1979). 殉教の美学 [The Aesthetics of Martyrdom] (in Japanese). Tōjusha. NCID BN07704732.
- Itasaka, Gō; Suzuki, Kunio (2010). 三島由紀夫と一九七〇年 [Yukio Mishima and 1970] (in Japanese). Rokusaisha. ISBN 978-4-8463-0772-1.
- Itasaka, Gō (2017). 三島由紀夫は、なぜ昭和天皇を殺さなかったのか [Why Yukio Mishima didn't Kill Emperor Shōwa] (in Japanese). Rokusaisha. ISBN 978-4-8463-1213-8.
- Itō, Katsuhiko (2002). 三島由紀夫の沈黙―その死と江藤淳・石原慎太郎 [The Silence of Yukio Mishima: His Death and Jun Etō, Shintaro Ishihara] (in Japanese). Tōshindo. ISBN 978-4-88713-448-5.
- Itō, Katsuhiko (2006). 最後のロマンティーク 三島由紀夫 [The Last Romantic: Yukio Mishima] (in Japanese). Shinyōsha. ISBN 978-4-7885-0981-8.
- Kawabata, Yasunari (1982). 川端康成全集 第29巻 評論1 [Yasunari Kawabata Complete Works No.29 – Criticisms 1] (in Japanese). Shinchosha. ISBN 978-4-10-643829-5.
- Kitakage, Yukō (2006). 三島由紀夫と葉隠武士道 [Yukio Mishima and Hagakure Bushido] (in Japanese). Hakua Shobo. ISBN 978-4-89172-683-6.
- Komuro, Naoki (1985). 三島由紀夫が復活する [Yukio Mishima will be Resurrected] (in Japanese). Mainichi Communications. NCID BN10913162.
- Matsufuji, Takejirō (2007). 三島由紀夫「残された手帳」 [Yukio Mishima "A Notebook Left Behind"] (in Japanese). Mainichi Wanz. ISBN 978-4-901622-24-0.
- Matsumoto, Ken'ichi (2005). 三島由紀夫の二・二六事件 [The February 26 Incident in Yukio Mishima]. Bunshun Shinsho (in Japanese). Bungeishunjū. ISBN 978-4-16-660475-3.
- Matsumoto, Tōru (1990). 三島由紀夫 年表作家読本 [Yukio Mishima: Author's Chronological Reader] (in Japanese). Kawade Shobō Shinsha. ISBN 978-4-309-70052-6.
- Matsumoto, Tōru; Satō, Hideaki; Inoue, Takashi, eds. (2008). 三島由紀夫 金閣寺 〈三島由紀夫研究6〉 [Yukio Mishima, The Temple of the Golden Pavilion]. Research of Yukio Mishima 6 (in Japanese). Kanae Shobo. ISBN 978-4-907846-58-9.
- Miller, Henry (2017). 三島由紀夫の死 [The Death of Yukio Mishima]. Henry Miller Collection 15 (in Japanese). Translated by Matsuda, Kenjiro; Kobayashi, Michiyo; others. Suiseisha. ISBN 978-4-8010-0004-9.
- Miyazaki, Masahiro (2014). 吉田松陰が復活する！―憂国の論理と行動 [Yoshida Shōin will be Resurrected!: The Logic of Patriotism and the Actions] (in Japanese). Namiki Shobo. ISBN 978-4-89063-323-4.
- Muramatsu, Takeshi (1990). 三島由紀夫の世界 [The World of Yukio Mishima] (in Japanese). Shinchosha. ISBN 978-4-10-321402-1.
- Muramatsu, Takeshi (1994). 西欧との対決―漱石から三島、遠藤まで [Confrontations with Western Europe: From Sōseki to Mishima to Endō] (in Japanese). Shinchosha. ISBN 978-4-10-321403-8.
- Murata, Haruki (2015). 三島由紀夫が生きた時代―楯の会と森田必勝 [The Period when Yukio Mishima was Alive: The Tatenokai and Masakatsu Morita] (in Japanese). Seirindo. ISBN 978-4-7926-0532-2.
- Nakagawa, Yusuke (2010). 昭和45年11月25日―三島由紀夫自決、日本が受けた衝撃 [November 25, 1970: Yukio Mishima's Suicide, the Impact on Japan]. Gentosha Shinsho 184 (in Japanese). Gentosha. ISBN 978-4-344-98185-0.
- Nihon Gakusei Shimbun, ed. (1971). 回想の三島由紀夫 [Yukio Mishima in Reminiscence] (in Japanese). Gyōsei Tsūshinsha. NCID BN0927582X.
- Nishi, Hōtaro (2020). 三島由紀夫事件 50年目の証言―警察と自衛隊は何を知っていたか [Yukio Mishima Incident – Testimonies of 50 Years Later: What did the Police and the Self-Defense Forces Know] (in Japanese). Shinchosha. ISBN 978-4-10-353581-2.
- Noguchi, Takehiko (1985). 三島由紀夫と北一輝 [Yukio Mishima and Ikki Kita] (in Japanese). Fukumura Shuppan. NCID BN01070867.
- Okamura, Ao (2020) [1st pub. Gendai Shokan:1990]. 三島由紀夫と森田必勝―楯の会事件 若き行動者の軌跡 [Yukio Mishima and Masakatsu Morita: The Tatenokai Incident, the Trajectory of a Young Activist]. Kōjinsha NF Bunko (in Japanese) (Paperback ed.). Ushio Shobo Kōjin Shinsha. ISBN 978-4-7698-3191-4.
- Saeki, Shōichi (1988) [1st pub. Shinchosha:1978]. 評伝 三島由紀夫 [Biography: Yukio Mishima]. Chuko Bunko (in Japanese) (Paperback ed.). Chuokoron-Shinsha. ISBN 978-4-12-201567-8.
- Sakurai, Hidenori (2020). 三島由紀夫は何を遺したか [What did Yukio Mishima Leave Behind] (in Japanese). Kizuna Shuppan. ISBN 978-4-86663-128-8.
- Shibata, Shōji (2012). 三島由紀夫 作品に隠された自決への道 [Yukio Mishima: The Path to Suicide Hidden in His Works] (in Japanese). Shodensha. ISBN 978-4-396-11300-1.
- Shibusawa, Tatsuhiko (1986) [1st pub. Rippū Shobo:1983]. 三島由紀夫おぼえがき [Memorandum on Yukio Mishima]. Chuko Bunko (in Japanese) (Paperback ed.). Chuokoron-Shinsha. ISBN 978-4-12-201377-3.
- Shindō, Sumitaka (1976). 伝記 川端康成 [Biography of Yasunari Kawabata] (in Japanese). Rokkō Shuppan. NCID BN00959203.
- Tokuoka, Takao (1999) [1st pub. 1996]. 五衰の人―三島由紀夫私記 [The Man of the Decay of the Angel: Private Notes about Yukio Mishima] (in Japanese) (Paperback ed.). Bungeishunjū. ISBN 978-4-16-744903-2.
- Yamamoto, Kiyokatsu (1980). 三島由紀夫・憂悶の祖国防衛賦―市ケ谷決起への道程と真相 [Yukio Mishima – An Anguish Verse of Fatherland Defense: The Path to the Ichigaya Uprising and the Truth] (in Japanese). Nihon Bungeisha. ISBN 978-4-537-00517-2. NCID BN10688248.
- Yamamoto, Mitsunobu (2017). 私の中の三島由紀夫 [Yukio Mishima in Me] (in Japanese). Hakurosha. ISBN 978-4-434-23098-1.
- Yamauchi, Yukito (2011). 三島由紀夫vs 司馬遼太郎―戦後精神と近代 [Yukio Mishima vs. Ryōtarō Shiba: Postwar Spirit and Modern Times] (in Japanese). Kawade Shobō Shinsha. ISBN 978-4-309-02051-8.
- Yamauchi, Yukito (2025). 巨大な夕焼―三島由紀夫の芸術と死 [The Huge Sunset Glow: The Art and Death of Yukio Mishima] (in Japanese). Kawade Shobō Shinsha. ISBN 978-4-309-92293-5.
- Yoshida, Kazuaki (1985). 三島由紀夫 [Yukio Mishima]. For Beginners Series 35 (in Japanese). Illustrated by Akira Wakaki. Gendai Shokan. ISBN 978-4-7684-0035-7.
- Yukio Mishima Study Group, ed. (2020). 「憂国忌」の五十年 [Fifty Years of "Yūkoku-ki"] (in Japanese). Keibunsha Shobo. ISBN 978-4-89992-071-7.
- Yukio Mishima Study Group, ed. (2024). 三島由紀夫 憂国と情念 [Yukio Mishima: His Patriotism and Passion] (in Japanese). Namiki Shobo. ISBN 978-4-89063-455-2.
- Chuokoron-Shinsha, ed. (2010). 中央公論特別編集 三島由紀夫と戦後 [Chūō Kōron Special Edition – Yukio Mishima and the Postwar Period] (in Japanese). Chuokoron-Shinsha. ISBN 978-4-12-004161-7.
- Chuokoron-Shinsha, ed. (2020). 中央公論特別編集 彼女たちの三島由紀夫 [Chūō Kōron Special Edition – Yukio Mishima through Women] (in Japanese). Chuokoron-Shinsha. ISBN 978-4-12-005347-4.
- Kawade Shobō Shinsha, ed. (1983) [1st pub. 1975]. 文芸読本 三島由紀夫 [Literary Reader: Yukio Mishima] (in Japanese) (New Binding ed.). Kawade Shobō Shinsha. ISBN 978-4-309-70002-1. NCID BA35307535.
- Kawade Shobō Shinsha, ed. (1990). 新文芸読本 三島由紀夫 [New Literary Reader: Yukio Mishima] (in Japanese). Kawade Shobō Shinsha. ISBN 978-4-309-70155-4.
- Kawade Shobō Shinsha, ed. (2020). 文藝別冊 三島由紀夫1970―海を二つに割るように、彼は逝った [Bungei Separate Volume – Yukio Mishima 1970: He Passed Away like Splitting the Sea in Two]. KAWADE Dream Mook (in Japanese). Kawade Shobō Shinsha. ISBN 978-4-309-98005-8.
- Shinchosha, ed. (1971). 新潮 1月・臨時増刊 三島由紀夫読本 [Shinchō – January Extra Special Issue: Yukio Mishima Reader] (in Japanese). Shinchosha. ASIN B00QRZ32NO.
- Shinchosha, ed. (1971). 新潮 2月・追悼特集号 [Shinchō – February Memorial Special Issue] (in Japanese). Shinchosha. ASIN B0DGK58TXY.
- 新潮社 (1990). Shinchosha (ed.). 新潮 12月・特大号 没後二十年 三島由紀夫特集 [Shinchō – December Extra Large Issue: Yukio Mishima 20 Years After His Death] (in Japanese). Shinchosha. doi:10.11501/6078693.
- Yumani Shobo, ed. (1999). 近代作家追悼文集成〈42〉三島由紀夫 [Collection of Memorial Texts for Modern Writers 42: Yukio Mishima] (in Japanese). Yumani Shobo. ISBN 978-4-89714-645-4.
