= Asaichi Isobe =

Imperial Japanese Army officer

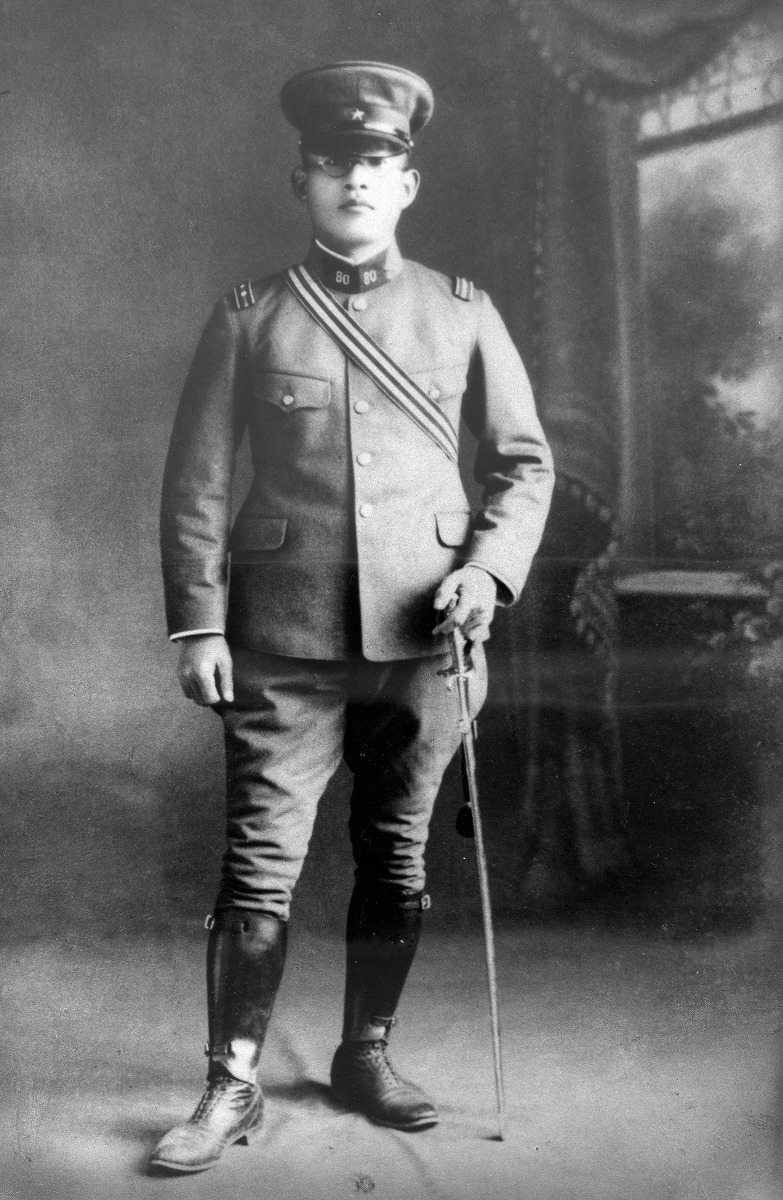
- Native name: 磯部 浅一
- Born: 1 April 1905; Yamaguchi Prefecture, Empire of Japan
- Died: 19 August 1937 (aged 32) Tokyo, Empire of Japan
- Cause of death: Execution by firing squad
- Branch: Imperial Japanese Army
- Service years: 1926–1936
- Rank: Lieutenant
- Conflicts: 26 February Incident

Asaichi Isobe (磯部 浅一, Isobe Asaichi; 1 April 1905 – 19 August 1937) was an Imperial Japanese Army officer who was one of the leaders of the 26 February Incident, a coup d'etat attempt by young officers of the Imperial Way Faction.

== Career ==
Born in Yamaguchi Prefecture, Isobe graduated from the 38th class of the Imperial Japanese Army Academy and rose to the rank of lieutenant. He was suspended in 1934 for being involved in plans for a coup d'état, and then discharged from the Army in 1935 when he published an incendiary pamphlet during his suspension. As a civilian, he was a leader in the February 26th Incident and was executed for his involvement.

== Portrayals ==
=== Film ===
- Isao Yamagata (『叛乱]』, 1954, Shin Saburi)
- Shinsuke Mikimoto (『重臣と青年将校 陸海軍流血史』, 1958, Michiyoshi Doi)
- Kei Satō (『銃殺 2・26の叛乱』, 1964, Tsuneo Kobayashi)
- Kōji Tsuruta (『日本暗殺秘録』, 1969, Sadao Nakajima )
- Shirō Sano (『悪徳の栄え』, 1988, Akio Jissoji)
- Naoto Takenaka (226, 1989, Hideo Gosha)

=== Drama ===
- Takenori Murano ("February 26th Incident of wives", 1976)
- Shun Oide ("Approaching the New Documentary Drama Showa Seicho Matsumoto incident", 1984, Murayama Shinji production)
- Takeshi Wakamatsu ("love had died in the Ardor 2.26", 1991) (in 'Isomura Asaichi' name)
- Tetsuya Chiba ("History is moved at that time", NHK, 14 day, broadcasting 21 February 2001)

== Bibliography ==
- Sasaki KiJiro "Isobeasaichi and half life of one innovation officer" (Furong Shobo, 1980)
- Yamazaki KuniOSamu "February 26th Incident and Isobeasaichi" (Kawade Shobō Shinsha, 1989)
- Ken-ichi Matsumoto "February 26th Incident of Yukio Mishima" Bungeishunju November <Bunshun Shinsho>, 2005.
- Masahiko Hamada "army of gods - the darkness of the international financial capital or Yukio Mishima," (thirty-five Museum, 2000)
