= Henry Scott-Stokes =

British journalist (1938–2022)

Henry Scott-Stokes (15 June 1938 – 19 April 2022) was a British journalist who was the Tokyo bureau chief for The Financial Times (1964–67), The Times (1967-1970s?), and The New York Times (1978–83). Stokes was known for his deep connections to Japanese literary and cultural circles, notably writing a definitive biography of the nationalist author and a personal friend of his Yukio Mishima. Over his career, he accomplished the rare feat of heading the Tokyo bureaus for three major international publications.

== Career ==
Stokes was educated at Winchester College and New College, Oxford. After graduating, he moved to Japan, where he became a journalist of the Tokyo bureau of The Times. Also around this time, he became close friends with famous Japanese author Yukio Mishima.

Succeeding Takashi Oka as Tokyo Bureau Chief of the New York Times from 1978 to 1983, his reporting primarily focused on Japan's rapid technological advancement, particularly the rise of factory automation and industrial robotics. He also chronicled the growing influence and power of Japanese corporations on the economy relative to the domestic government, changing post-war cultural identities, and regional East Asian geopolitics, including the political upheaval and military crackdowns in South Korea following the 1979 assassination of President Park Chung-hee.

He was alleged to be a revisionist of the Nanjing Massacre (allegedly viewing that it shouldn’t be described as a ‘massacre’).

He was the father of Henry Sugiyama Adrian Folliott Scott-Stokes. He suffered from advanced Parkinson's disease.

== Bibliography ==
- Henry Scott Stokes (1 September 1985). Vida Y Muerte De Yukio Mishima/the Life and Death of Yukio Mishima. Lectorum Pubns Inc. ISBN 978-8485501861.
- Henry Scott-Stokes (1999). 100 Samurai Companies: Japan's Top 100 Growth OTC Companies. Penguin. ISBN 978-0-14-028588-8.
- Henry Scott Stokes (8 August 2000). The Life and Death of Yukio Mishima. Cooper Square Press. ISBN 978-1-4616-2422-6.
- Henry Scott Stokes (17 November 2016). Fallacies in the Allied Nations' Historical Perception as Observed by a British Journalist. Hamilton Books. ISBN 978-0-7618-6810-1.
- Henry Scott Stokes; Jai-eui Lee (16 September 2016). The Kwangju Uprising: A Miracle of Asian Democracy as Seen by the Western and the Korean Press. Taylor & Francis. ISBN 978-1-315-29175-8.
