= Shun Akiyama =

Japanese writer

Shun Akiyama (秋山駿, Akiyama Shun; April 23, 1930 – October 2, 2013) was a Japanese literary critic and member of the Japan Art Academy.

He was born in Tokyo, and graduated from Waseda University in 1953 with a degree in French literature. Between 1979 and 1993 he was a professor at Tokyo University of Agriculture and Technology, and from 1997 at Musashino University. He died, aged 83, in Tokyo.

== Books ==
- 『内部の人間』（1967, 南北社, のち晶文社）
- 『対談・私の文学』（1969, 講談社）
- 『無用の告発－存在のための考察』（1969, 河出書房）
- 『抽象的な逃走』冬樹社 1970
- 『歩行と貝殻』講談社 1970
- 『時が流れるお城が見える』（1971, 仮面社）
- 『考える兇器』冬樹社 1972
- 『小林秀雄と中原中也』 第三文明社(レグルス文庫) 1973
- 『作家論』 第三文明社 1973
- 『秋山駿批評 1』1973, 小沢書店
- 『地下室の手記』（1974, 徳間書店/1991年5月、日本文芸社）
- 『秋山駿批評 2』小沢書店 1975
- 『言葉の棘 』北洋社 1975
- 『文学への問い 秋山駿第一対談集』徳間書店 1975
- 『秋山駿文芸時評 1970・6-1973・12 』河出書房新社 1975
- 『内的生活』（1976, 講談社）
- 『秋山駿批評 3』小沢書店 1976
- 『知れざる炎 評伝中原中也』（1977, 河出書房新社/1991年5月, 講談社文芸文庫）
- 『架空のレッスン』小沢書店 1977
- 『批評のスタイル 』アディン書房 1978
- 『内的な理由』構想社 1979
- 『文学の目覚める時 秋山駿第二対談集』徳間書店 1979
- 『舗石の思想』 講談社 1980 (2002, 講談社文芸文庫)
- 『秋山駿批評 4』小沢書店 1981
- 『生の磁場 文芸時評1977～1981』小沢書店 1982
- 『本の顔本の声』福武書店 1982
- 『こころの詭計』（小沢書店 1983）
- 『魂と意匠 小林秀雄』（1985, 講談社）
- 『簡単な生活者の意見』（1988年, 小沢書店）
- 『恋愛の発見』小沢書店 1988
- 『人生の検証』（1990, 新潮社 のち新潮文庫/2002年5月, 新潮オンデマンドブックス）
- 『時代小説礼讃』（1990, 日本文芸社）
- 『歩行者の夢想 秋山駿自選評論集』学芸書林 1991
- 『路上の櫂歌』（1994, 小沢書店）
- 『信長』新潮社 1996（のち新潮文庫, 1999年）
- 『信長発見』共著（1997, 小沢書店 のち朝日文庫）
- 『砂粒の私記』(1997年, 講談社）
- 『作家と作品私のデッサン集成』(1998, 小沢書店）
- 『片耳の話 言葉はこころの杖』(2001, 光芒社）
- 『神経と夢想－私の「罪と罰」』(2003, 講談社）
- 『信長と日本人 魂の言葉で語れ!』(2004, 飛鳥新社）
- 『小説家の誕生 瀬戸内寂聴』(2004, おうふう）
- 『批評の透き間』(2005, 鳥影社）
- 『私小説という人生』（2006, 新潮社）
- 『内部の人間の犯罪 秋山駿評論集』 2007 講談社文芸文庫
- 『忠臣蔵』(2008年, 新潮社)
- 『「生」の日ばかり』講談社 2011

== Awards ==
- Gunzō Award for New Writers, literary criticism division (1960）
- Itō-Sei Literary Prize (1990）
- Noma Literary Prize (1996）
- Mainichi Publishing Culture Award (1996）
- Watsuji Tetsurō Culture Award (2003）
