= Mishima incident =

Attempted coup d'état in Japan on November 25, 1970, by writer Yukio Mishima

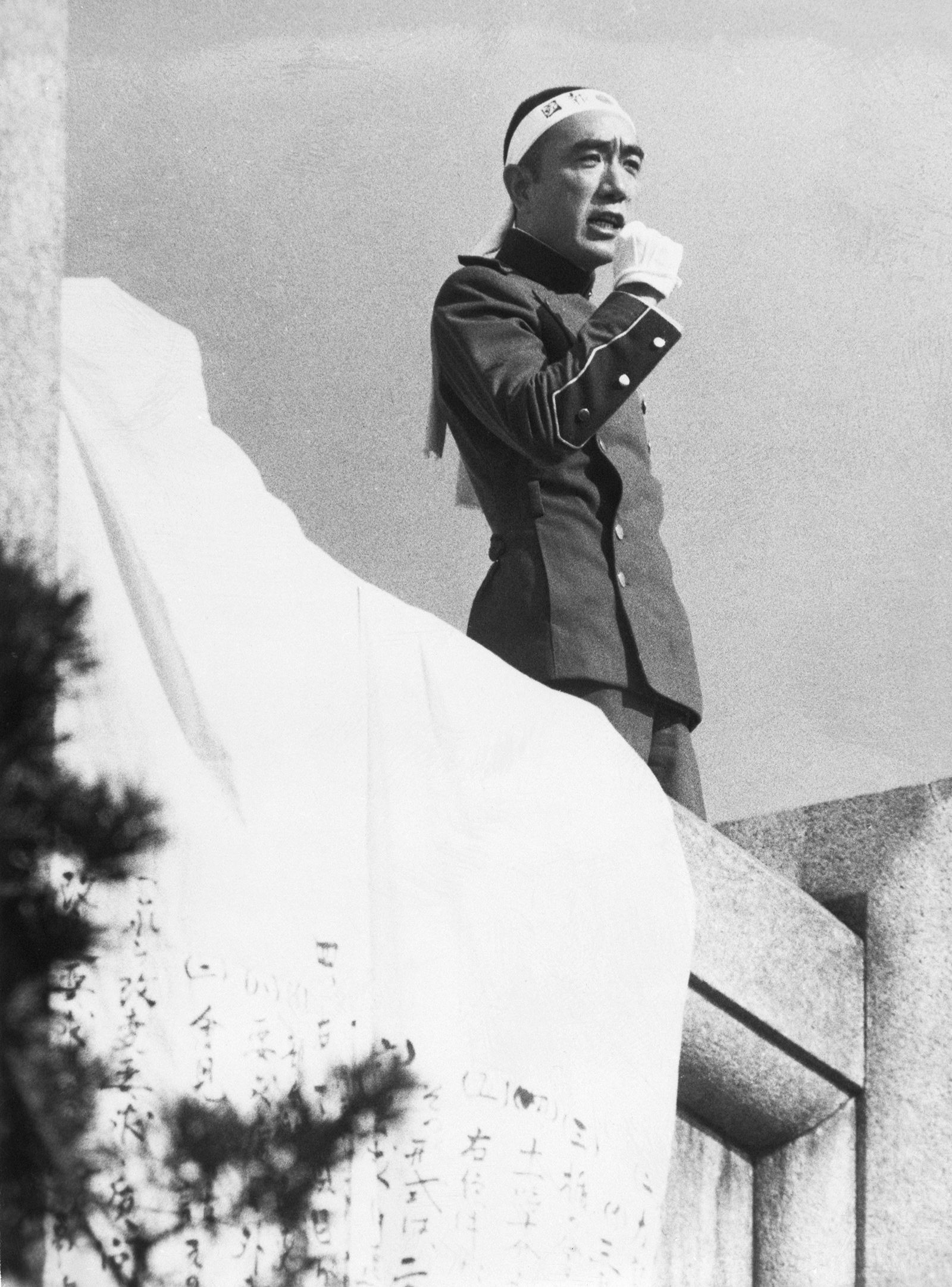
- Mishima giving a speech on the balcony
- Date: November 25, 1970
- Location: Ichigaya-honmura-cho 1-banchi, Shinjuku-ku, Tokyo, Japan; Japan Ground Self-Defense Force Camp Ichigaya
- Goals: Revision of the Constitution of Japan
- Methods: Hostage-taking, speech
- Result: No change to the constitution; Hostages released; Plotters commit seppuku (ritual suicide) or surrender

Parties
Tatenokai	Japan Ground Self-Defense Force; Eastern Army (Japan); Eastern Army HQ; 32nd Infantry Regiment

Lead figures
Yukio Mishima ‡‡	Kanetoshi Mashita

Number
5	≈12

Casualties
- Deaths: 2
- Injuries: 8
- Arrested: 3

The Mishima incident (三島事件, Mishima jiken) occurred on November 25, 1970, when the Japanese author Yukio Mishima committed seppuku (ritual suicide) after calling on the Japan Self-Defense Forces to stage a coup d'état to abolish Article 9 of the Japanese Constitution and appealing to his own ideas and beliefs about reconstructing true national autonomy. The incident is sometimes called the Tatenokai incident (楯の会事件, Tatenokai jiken), after the private militia led by Mishima whose members took part.

The incident shocked Japan and made international headlines because of such a renowned author's unprecedented actions. Mishima's death was seen to mark the end of an era. It also had a major impact on Japan's political climate, including the rise to the New Right, which grew out of minzoku-ha. A survey conducted by the monthly magazine Bungei Shunjū in 2000 on the "20 Greatest Events of the 20th Century," the Mishima Incident was ranked second, ahead of global events such as the fall of the Berlin Wall. (Note: The first ranked event was Japan's surrender on August 15, 1945.)

While the incident constituted a political protest meant to demonstrate their political vision, judicial investigations and Mishima's suicide notes reveal that the action itself was not intended to effect a government overthrow or a seizure of power. Even so, the incident is considered to possess significant historical importance and to have exerted a lasting impact on Japanese society.

== Incident ==
=== Visit and restraint of commander ===
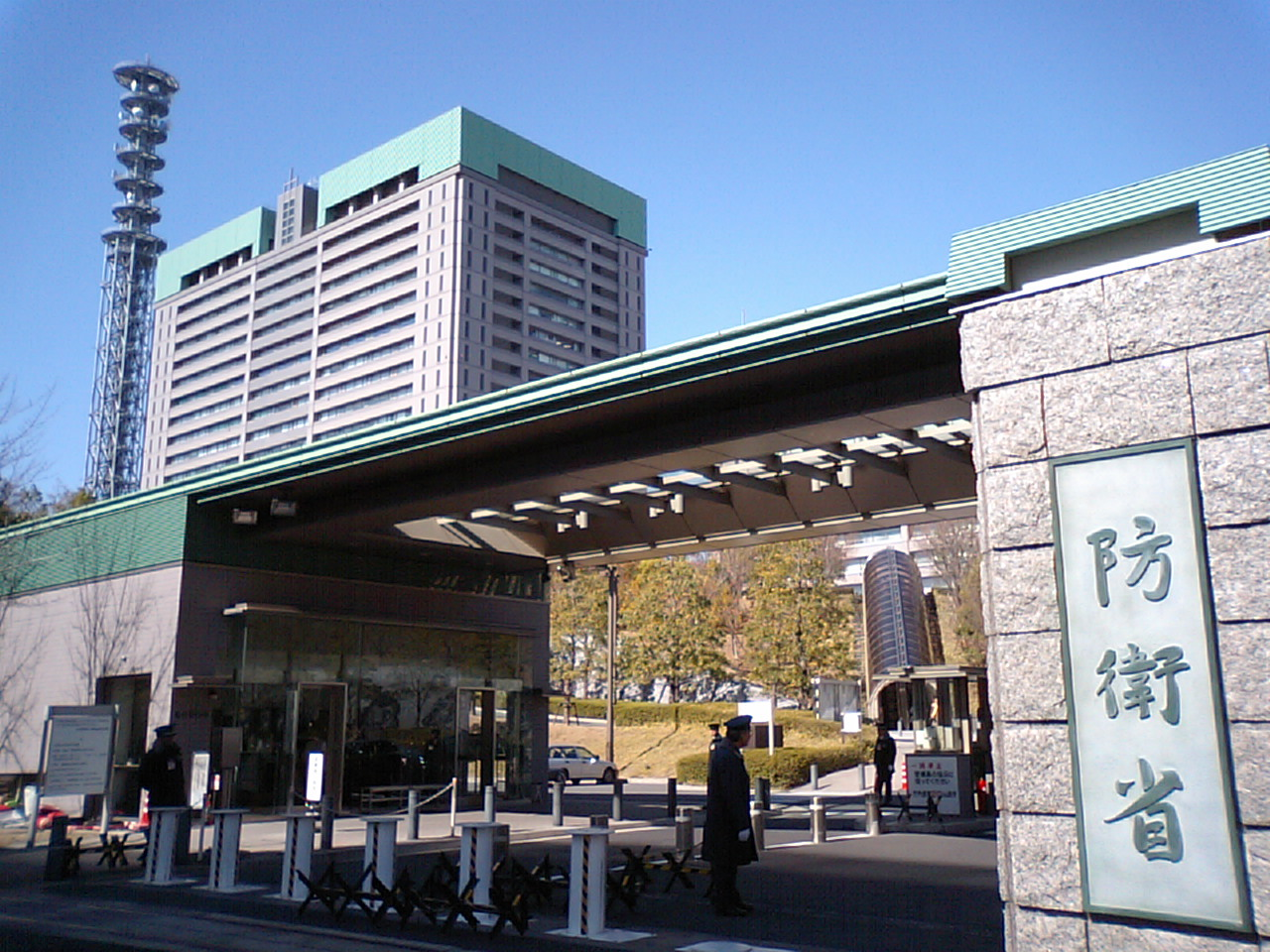
The Camp Ichigaya, where the incident took place. At the time the sign read "Ground Self-Defense Force, Camp Ichigaya" (陸上自衛隊 市ヶ谷駐とん地). The Eastern Army Headquarters, that was located here, was relocated to Camp Asaka in 1994.

Around 10:58 am on November 25, 1970, Yukio Mishima (age 45), along with four Tatenokai members – Masakatsu Morita (age 25), Masayoshi Koga (小賀正義; age 22), Masahiro Ogawa (小川正洋; age 22), and Hiroyasu Koga (age 23) – passed through the Yotsuya Gate (四谷門), the main gate of the Japan Ground Self-Defense Force Camp Ichigaya (市ヶ谷駐屯地) by car, arriving at the front entrance that led to the Commandant General's office on the second floor of the Eastern Army Headquarters. Guided by Major Yasuharu Sawamoto (沢本泰治), who met them there, they went up the front staircase, then escorted to the Commandant General’s office by Colonel Isamu Hara (原勇), Chief of the Administration Division of the Eastern Army HQ. (Note: This building of the Eastern Army Headquarters was the site of the Imperial Japanese Army Academy from 1874 (Meiji 7) to 1879 (Meiji 12), and during the war, the Imperial General Headquarters, the Army Ministry, and the Imperial Japanese Army General Staff Office, making it a mecca for the Imperial Japanese Army. After Japan's defeat in the Pacific War, Major Makoto Haruke (晴気誠) and General Teiichi Yoshimoto committed seppuku here, and it was also the site of the courtroom for the International Military Tribunal for the Far East.)

This visit had been booked in advance on November 21, and Sergeant Ryoichi Nakao (中尾良一) of the Operations Office had contacted the guard post via internal line to give them a free passage. The gatekeeper, Sergeant Akira Suzuki (鈴木偣), simply exchanged salutes with Mishima in the passenger seat and he was allowed through. (Note: When Major Yasuharu Sawamoto, who greeted Mishima at the front entrance, asked about the Japanese sword he was carrying, Mishima replied that it was a "command sword" that used at regular meetings.)

Led to the reception area and invited to take a seat, Mishima called out the names of Morita and the three others one by one – keeping them standing at attention – and introduced them to the Commander-in-Chief, Lieutenant General Kanetoshi Mashita (益田兼利; age 57), as "outstanding members" to be honored. He explained his reason for bringing the four along in the office, saying, "I brought these men today because during the trial enlistment in November, they selflessly carried an injured comrade on their backs all the way down the mountain. I will commend them at today's regular meeting at Ichigaya Hall (市ヶ谷会館), so I brought them here hoping to introduce them to you first. Since we have our meeting today, we came in formal uniform."

As General Mashita and Mishima were conversing on the sofa facing each other, the topic turned to the Japanese sword Mishima had brought with him. When Mashita asked, "Is it genuine?" and "Don't the police question you for carrying such a military sword (軍刀, guntō)?", Mishima replied, "This guntō (ceremonial sword) features a blade of Seki Magoroku (関孫六), remounted with military fittings. Would you like to see the certificate of authenticity?" and showed him the document inscribed with "Seki Kanemoto" (関兼元). (Note: Possession of a certificate of authenticity for Seki no Magoroku signifies authorization to carry the military sword.)

Mishima unsheathed his sword and asked Masayoshi Koga (nickname "Chibi-Koga") for a tenugui (traditional towel) to wipe off the oil, saying, "Koga, a handkerchief", which was a prearranged signal to begin action. However, as Mashita made an unexpected move – heading toward his desk while saying, "How about washi tissue paper (ちり紙, chirigami)?" – Chibi-Koga lost sight of his task and had no choice but to approach Mishima and hand him a tenugui. Unable to find a suitable chirigami tissue, Mashita returned to the sofa and sat down next to Mishima to look at the sword.

Mishima wiped the blade with a tenugui and handed the sword over to Mashita. After seeing the hamon (edge pattern), Mashita nodded and said, "It's a fine katana. This katana crest is indeed the Three Cedar Trees (三本杉, Sambon sugi)," and returned it to Mishima before returning to his seat. It was now about 11:05 am. Mishima wiped the blade again, handed the tenugui to Chibi-Koga who had stepped up beside him, and sheathed the sword to its scabbard with a sharp click of the tsuba, signaling the instruction to him with a glance.

Taking that as a signal, Chibi-Koga, who was pretending to return to his seat, quickly went behind the General Mashita and covered the General Mashita's mouth with the tenugui he was holding, after which Masahiro Ogawa and Hiroyasu Koga (nickname "Furu-Koga") next tied the General Mashita to a chair with thin rope and restrained him. Chibi-Koga, who was given another tenugui by Furu-Koga, gagged the General Mashita while saying, "I won't gag you so to stop breathing," and pointed a tantō (short blade) at him.

General Mashita, initially thinking that everyone was joking about how strong they had become during ranger training, said, "Mr. Mishima, stop joking," but Mishima, with his sword still drawn, glared at General Mashita with a serious expression, so the General Mashita realized that something was not right. Meanwhile, Masakatsu Morita had barricaded the main entrance to the Commandant General's office, and the three entrances to the Chief of Staff's office and the Vice Chief of Staff's office, all of which had double doors, with desks, chairs, flower pots, etc.

=== Fight with the staff officers ===
Major Yasuharu Sawamoto, who was waiting for the right time to serve tea, noticed a noise coming from the Commandant General's room, and Colonel Isamu Hara, who received the report from Sawamoto, went out into the hallway and peeked into the room through the frosted glass window at the front entrance (a strip of cellophane tape had been applied to make it slightly more transparent), where he saw the Tatenokai members standing behind the General Mashita. The General looked as if he was receiving a massage, but his movements were unnatural, so when Hara tried to enter, he found the door locked.

Colonel Hara threw himself against the door, creating a gap of about 20 to 30 centimeters. "Don't come in! Don't come in!" cried Masakatsu Morita from inside the room, and a Demands letter was slid out from under the door. After reading it, Colonel Hara and his staff immediately reported to Vice Chief of Administration Major General Akira Yamazaki (山崎皎; age 53) and Vice Chief of Defense Colonel Hidenobu Yoshimatsu (吉松秀信; age 50) that "Mishima and his members have occupied the Commandant General's office and have confined the General Mashita." An emergency call (非常呼集, Hijō Koshu) was made to the staff, and a subordinate of Major Sawamoto contacted the military police (警務隊, Keimu-tai).

Lieutenant Colonel Haruo Kawabe (川辺晴夫; age 46) and Lieutenant Colonel Nobumasa Nakamura (中村菫正; age 45) were the first to rush in after using their back to break down the barricade protecting the door to the Chief of Staff's office which led to the left of the Commandant General's office. Mishima immediately drew his military sword, Seki Magoroku, and slashed at their backs and other parts of their bodies. He then fought back against Colonel Hara, Sergeant Toshikazu Kasama (笠間寿一; age 36), Sergeant Junzō Isobe (磯部順蔵), and others who had charged in with bokkens, shouting "Get out! Don't get in the way!" and "Read the demand!" When fighting back, Mishima lowered his hips and drew his sword closer to him, and instead of swinging it down from above, he slashed with the tip of the blade. The melee left a sword cut near the door handle. The time was about 11:20 am.

While the five men were retreating, seven more men, Colonel Fujio Kiyono (清野不二雄; age 50), Lieutenant Colonel Kiyoshi Takahashi (高橋清; age 43), Major Katsumi Terao (寺尾克美; age 41), Captain Eijiro Mizuta (水田栄二郎), non-commissioned officer Yoshifumi Kikuchi (菊地義文), Colonel Hidenobu Yoshimatsu, and Major General Akira Yamazaki, rushed in one after another from the side of the Vice Chief of Staff's office. Vice Chief of Defense Colonel Yoshimatsu said, "What are you doing? Let's talk it out," but the fight continued. Hiroyasu Koga threw small tables and chairs at the men, and Masahiro Ogawa fought back with a special baton (特殊警棒, tokushu keibō).

Morita also fought back with his tantō, but Major Terao ripped it away from him. Mishima quickly supported, slashing at Terao and Lieutenant Colonel Takahashi, who had dragged Morita to the ground. When Colonel Kiyono threw an ashtray at Chibi-Koga, who was keeping tabs on the General Mashita, prompting Mishima to slash at Kiyono. Kiyono fought back by throwing a globe, but stumbled and fell. Major General Yamazaki was also slashed, and the JSDF staff officers decided to retreat for the time being, out of concern for the General Mashita's safety. Eight JSDF staff officers were injured in the brawl. (Note: The most seriously injured of the JSDF staff officer was Lieutenant Colonel Nobumasa Nakamura (中村菫正), who sustained cuts to his right elbow and the back of his left palm, and needed 12 weeks to recover. Nakamura thought Mishima's sword was a toy and tried to snatch it away with his left hand, cutting the tendons in his palm and leaving him with a permanent disability that caused him to lose the grip of his left hand. However, Nakamura said, "I have absolutely no grudge" against Mishima, and recalled, "I don't think Mishima intended to kill me when he slashed me. If he had intended to kill someone, he would have slashed more boldly, and when I was slashed my right arm, I sensed he was pulling punches.")

At 11:22 am, an emergency 110 call was placed from the Eastern Army Headquarters to the Tokyo Metropolitan Police Department's Command Center. By 11:25 am, the TMPD Public Security Bureau's "Public Security Division 1" – which was originally under normal conditions, for the left-wing extremism's acts of violence Countermeasures Division – had established a temporary headquarters in the Public Security Bureau Director-General's office and contacted the relevant agencies, and dispatched 120 Riot Police Unit members to JGSDF Camp Ichigaya.

The staff members who had retreated outside broke the window of the Commandant General's office from the hallway at around 11:30 am to discuss with Mishima. Lieutenant Colonel Matsuo Kunugi (功刀松男; age 50) was the first to show his face through the window, and was cut on the forehead by a flagpole that had been thrust out from inside. Then Lieutenant Colonel Yoshimatsu tried to persuade Mishima through the window, but Mishima said, "If you accept this Demands, we will spare General Mashita's life," and threw the Demands letter, which had the same contents as the one Morita had slid out from under the door into the hallway, through the broken window into the hallway.

The Demands mainly contained the following statements:

(1) All JSDF personnel of Camp Ichigaya to be assembled in front of the main building by 11:30 am.

(2) Listen quietly to the speeches as set below.

(a) Mishima's speech (scattering our Geki)
(b) Participated students announce their names.
(c) Mishima's instructions to the remaining members of the Tatenokai

(3) The remaining members of the Tatenokai (who are unrelated to this incident) must be quickly summoned from the Ichigaya Hall to make them attend in line.

(4) For the two-hour period from 11:30 am to 1:10 pm, there to be no obstruction of any kind. As long as no obstruction of any kind is done, we will not launch any attacks.

(5) Once the above conditions have been fully complied with and two hours have elapsed, the Commandant General will be handed over to him in safety. He will be escorted by two or more our guards and handed over to you at the main entrance of the main building while still restrained (to prevent him from committing suicide).

(6) If the above conditions are not met, or there is any risk that they will not be met, Mishima will kill the Commandant General at once, and will commit suicide.

— Yukio Mishima, Demands

The senior staff officers decided to accept Mishima's Demands, and at around 11:34 am, Lieutenant Colonel Yoshimatsu told Mishima, "We have decided to assemble the JSDF personnel." Mishima asked him, "Who are you? What authority do you have?" When Colonel Yoshimatsu introduced himself as "the Vice Chief of Defense and the highest authority on the scene," Mishima looked a little relieved, looked at his watch, and said, "Assemble all the JSDF personnel by 12:00 pm."

While waiting for the JSDF personnel to assemble, Mishima ordered Morita to read the Demands to General Mashita as well. General Mashita, whose hands had gone numb, had them loosen the thin rope slightly, then tried to persuade Mishima by saying, "Why are you doing this? Do you hate the JSDF or me? Depending on the content, I may give the speech on your behalf." Mishima replied with points similar to his Geki, which was stating that if things continued as they were, Japan would become a mercenary of the United States forever, and said, "I don't hate either the JSDF or you. As long as they don't interfere, I won't kill you." He then said, "I have come today to give the JSDF the greatest stimulus and spur them into action."

Whether Mishima actually smoked an Imperial gift cigarette Onshi no Tabako in the Commandant General's office remains unknown. (Note: In Henry Scott-Stokes's biography of Mishima, it is stated definitively that Mishima was smoking a cigarette at this moment. Also, in the film Mishima: A Life in Four Chapters (1985), which appears to be based on Scott-Stokes's book, there is a scene depicting Mishima smoking a cigarette in the Commandant General's office before delivering his speech. However, Japanese literature that cross-examines the events based on testimony from those involved remains inconclusive on this point.) However, two days prior, remarking, "We should at least have enough time to smoke a cigarette at the scene," he had handed the members the Onshi no Tabako he received at the autumn 1966 Imperial garden party (園遊会, Enyukai), instructing them to pack them into the attaché case along with the other items. (Note: Incidentally, in June 1970, when Colonel Kiyokatsu Yamamoto (山本舜勝) visited Mishima's residence last, Mishima gifted a few of Onshi no Tabako given out by the Emperor, to Colonel Yamamoto, as if it were his keepsake.)

At 11:40 am, an announcement was made over the loudspeaker within Camp Ichigaya, repeatedly saying, "Personnel whose duties are not disrupted are requested to assemble in front of the main building entrance." At 11:46 am, the Tokyo Metropolitan Police Department gave the order to arrest Mishima and all the others. Police cars and white jeeps of the military police force entered Camp Ichigaya one after another at high speed. By this time, the first reports of the incident had already been broadcast on television and radio.

=== Speech on the balcony ===
About 800 to 1000 JSDF personnel who had heard the announcement within the unit began to gather in the front yard in front of the main entrance of the Eastern Army Headquarters building. Some of them had already started eating lunch in the dining hall, but stopped doing so to join. Confusing messages were exchanged among them, such as "a mob has broken in and someone has been slashed," "the Commandant General has been taken hostage," "the Red Army Faction of Communist League (赤軍派, Sekigunn ha) must have come," and "Is Yukio Mishima there too?"

At about 11:55 am, Masakatsu Morita and Masahiro Ogawa, who wearing hachimaki headbands and white gloves, scattered many copies of Geki and hung the banners with their Demands drawn with ink brush strokes from the balcony in front of the Commandant General's office. Two JSDF personnel jumped up and try to pull the banner down, but were unable to reach it. Riot Police Unit members carrying duralumin shields, and the vehicles belonging to newspaper and television reporters were also gathered in the front yard.

On that day, about 30 members of the Tatenokai had come to Ichigaya Hall in Camp Ichigaya, located only about 50 meters from the Eastern Army Headquarters building, for their regular meeting, but the JSDF senior staff officers did not accept Mishima's demands and instead confined them inside the hall, placing them under police guard and not summoning them to assemble in front of the main entrance of the Eastern Army Headquarters building. Sensing that something was happened, and becoming agitated, a skirmish broke out between these Tatenokai members and police or the JSDF; the Tatenokai members were subdued with pistols.

A siren announcing noon rang out in the sky above Camp Ichigaya, and Mishima stood on the balcony, (Note: This balcony was once the location where Ōta Dōkan, a military commander in the late Muromachi period, built an observation deck to defend Edo Castle.) holding up in his right hand the unsheathed Japanese sword "Seki Magoroku," shining in the sunlight. The sword was only visible for a moment. Mishima wore a white hachimaki headband with a red hinomaru circle, in which the center bearing the kanji for "To be reborn seven times to serve the country" (七生報國, Shichishō hōkoku). (Note: The meaning of the phrase "To be reborn seven times to serve the country" is to destroy the enemy of the state and repay the country, even if reborn seven times, and it explained in the Taiheiki as the last words uttered by Kusunoki Masasue, the younger brother of the 14th-century imperial loyalist samurai Kusunoki Masashige, when he committed suicide together with his older brother Masashige.) Behind him to the right, Morita, wearing an identical hachimaki, stood like a guardian god (仁王立ち, Nio-dachi), gazing straight ahead.

Amidst voices of "It's Mishima," "What's that?", and "You idiot!" Mishima began his speech, raising his white-gloved fist and screaming so that the assembled JSDF personnel could hear. It was a speech urging a revolt to amend the Article 9 of the Japanese Constitution, calling for a return to the "original purpose of the military's founding" to "protect Japan." The message was almost the same as that in the Geki, which had been scattered beforehand. In the sky above, several media helicopters that had quickly caught wind of the incident were already circling, making a lot of noise.

Listen, guys. Be quiet. Be quiet. Listen to what I'm saying. A man is staking his life to appeal to you all. Listen. If the Japanese don't stand up here now, if the Japan Self-Defense Forces don't stand up, there will be no constitutional reform. You will forever become just the troops for America. You and Japan... commands will only come from America. It's called civilian control... As for civilian control, it's not civilian control that will be suppressed under the new constitution.
Therefore, I've waited for four years. For the day when the Japan Self-Defense Forces would rise up. ... I've waited for four years ... I'm waiting ... for the last 30 minutes. You are all bushi, aren't you? If you are bushi, why would you protect the "constitution that denies your existence"? (Note: Article 9 of the Japanese Constitution explicitly stipulates "No possession of military forces" (「戦力の不保持」) and "Denial of the right to wage war" (「交戦権の否認」).) Why would you bow down and cringe to the "constitution that denies you" for the sake of the "constitution that denies you yourselves"? As long as this exists, you will never be saved. (Note: Mishima's Geki describes the JSDF personnel, who bow down to the Constitution that denies them, as "self-blasphemers.")

— Yukio Mishima, Speech on the balcony

Many of the JSDF personnel shouted at Mishima angrily, saying, "We can't hear you," "Pull back!", "Come down and talk," "What the hell do such you know?", and "You idiot!" When a heckler shouted, "Why did you hurt our comrades?", Mishima immediately responded in a forceful voice, saying, "It's because they resisted our demands."

Sergeant K (his name is withheld in the original text), who was present at the scene, clicked his tongue at the noisy hecklers and later said, "I wanted to listen properly to what Yukio Mishima was screaming at the top of his lungs." "There were parts where I couldn't hear what he was saying because of the heckling, but emotionally I understood that Mishima might have had a point,"

Mishima shouted, "Is there not even one man among you who will rise up with me?" and waited in silence for about 5 to 10 seconds, but the JSDF personnel continued to yell abuse at him, calling him a "Madman!" and saying "There's no way someone like that exists." The unexpected intensity of the shouts and the noise from the helicopters meant that the speech was cut short after just 10 minutes, much shorter than planned. One has speculated that Mishima cut his speech short because he caught the wind of the Riot Police Unit making preparations to storm into the first floor then.

After wrapping up his speech, Mishima and Morita headed towards the Imperial Palace and chanted "Long live the Emperor!" (天皇陛下万歳, Tennō heika banzai) three times. Even then, the jeers of "Drag him down" and "Shoot him" made their chants nearly inaudible. On that day, the 32nd Infantry Regiment (第32普通科連隊) under the 1st Division had gone to the East Fuji Maneuver Area, leaving behind about 100 troops, while its 900 elite troops were absent. Based on Morita's information, Mishima mistakenly thought that only the regimental commander was absent. Many of the JSDF personnel gathered in front of the balcony were the persons in charge of communications, materials, supplies, and other duties, and as such were not the "bushi" that Mishima had envisioned and expected. The writer Yaeko Nogami, who watched Mishima's speech on television, has recalled how she felt at the time, saying that if she were his mother, she would have "wanted to run over there and deliver the microphone to him."

Mishima did not use a microphone because he placed an emphasis on getting as close as possible to the spirituality of the Shinpūren rebellion by the God-honoring party (敬神党, Keishintō), one of the parties formed by samurai with the philosophy of Sonnō jōi. He insisted on using his own voice to roar, without using a microphone or loudspeaker. In his dialogue with Fusao Hayashi, Dialogue: Theory about the Japanese (対話・日本人論, Taiwa: Nihonjin ron) (1966), Mishima had spoken passionately about how the Shinpūren samurai placed white fans on their heads when passing under electric wires to oppose Western civilization, and about the meaning of their yamato-damashii in venture fighting with only Japanese swords. (Note: When the training of the Tatenokai, Mishima had explained the reason why the smallest military unit was ten people, saying to students, "The range that a person can convey the true meaning of what he or she speaks without error and have the other person accurately understand is a maximum of ten people," he also had said "unless the speaker speaks in a normal voice within a range where the listener can directly get through the speaker's facial expressions, breathing, and sign of presence, the true meaning of what is being said is not easily conveyed," and that "if a speaker speaks to a large audience using a microphone, a modern convenience, and raises his or her voice, it is bound to contain falsehood and exaggeration, and essentially fails to move people's hearts.")

Regarding the reason why the JSDF personnel did not listen carefully to Mishima's speeches, the manga artist Shigeru Mizuki has reflected in 1989, some 20 years later, saying, "The reason why Mishima was not taken seriously by the JSDF personnel, even though he emphasized Bushidō, was probably because the JSDF personnel at the time had also already become inclined toward individualism and hedonism in economically prosperous Japan."

The Weekly magazine Sunday Mainichi (サンデー毎日) reporter Takao Tokuoka (徳岡孝夫) and NHK reporter Munekatsu Date (伊達宗克) had been contacted in advance by Mishima and were asked and promised to come to Ichigaya Hall at 11:00 am on the morning of the day. When Tokuoka and Date arrived at the hall, they were each given an envelope containing Mishima's letter, Geki, and the last commemorative photo of the five men, via Kenichi Tanaka (田中健一) and Kenji Kurata (倉田賢司), respectively, of the Tatenokai members who were close friends of Masakatsu Morita. Mishima had entrusted it to them in case the Geki was confiscated by the police and the incident was covered up. Tokuoka had hidden it inside his sock, run toward the balcony, and listened to the speech.

Television station personnel who rushed to the front yard have testified that they could barely hear Mishima's speech because of the heckling and noise of helicopters, but Tokuoka has said, "If only they had been willing to listen, they could have heard it," "Why didn't they calm their minds a little more and listen?", and "We magazine reporters were able to hear the speech relatively well, perhaps our ears are different to those of the television personnel." (Note: 40 years after the incident, Takao Tokuoka has talked that he keeps the notes he wrote of Mishima's speeches – to the extent that he was able to hear them – in a bank safe deposit box, along with original letter and photographs entrusted to him by Mishima on the day of the incident.)

Nippon Cultural Broadcasting was the only station to record the entire speech. By tying a microphone to a tree branch, they managed to capture a clear recording of Mishima's voice shouting angrily at the JSDF personnel, "Are you really bushi at all like that!" amid the roar of insults and the noise of news helicopters, and this became a scoop. The recording tape also includes Morita's voice saying "Everyone please listen."

=== Seppuku ===
At around 12:10 pm, Mishima returned to the Commandant General's office with Morita from the balcony and muttered to himself, "I probably spoke for about 20 minutes. It seems my message didn't get across." He then stood in front of General Mashita and said, "We have no grudge against you. We did it to return the JSDF to the Emperor. I had no choice but to do this," and unbuttoned his uniform.

Mishima received the tantō that Masayoshi Koga (小賀正義; Chibi-Koga) was pointed at the General Mashita through Morita, and handed Morita his own unsheathed Japanese sword, "Seki Magoroku", in return. Then, on the red carpet about three meters away from the General Mashita, with his upper body naked, holding the tantō in both hands, sat seiza-style facing the balcony, then tried to dissuade Morita from committing suicide by telling him, words: "Morita, you must live, not die.", "You stop dying."

According to the plan, Mishima would write the character "Martial (武, Bu)" on a piece of square drawing paper (色紙, sikishi) with the blood of seppuku, so Chibi-Koga handed the paper over to Mishima, who replied, "I don't have to do that anymore," with a sad smile, and handed him the expensive watch he was wearing on his right arm, saying, "Koga, I'll give this to you." And Mishima said, "Hmm," putting his energy into the process, and then said, "Yaaaaa" thrust the tantō into his left side belly with both hands, and committed seppuku in a straight line manner (真一文字作法, shin ichimonnji sahō) to the right.

Morita, the kaishakunin standing behind Mishima to the left, was about to commit seppuku himself after Mishima. Perhaps he was hesitant in regards to his respected mentor, but he swung his sword down on Mishima's neck twice; despite this, he only managed to cut it halfway through, and Mishima's body quietly leaned forward. Seeing that Mishima was still alive, Chibi-Koga and Hiroyasu Koga (Furu-Koga) called out, "Morita-san, one more blow," and "Finish him off," and Morita swung his sword down for the third time. (Note: It is said that at this time, Morita failed at kaishaku three times, causing the tip of his sword to bend into an S-shape.) The General Mashita was trying to stop their actions, shouting, "Stop it," "Don't kaishaku him, don't finish him off."

Morita, whose kaishaku did not go well, said, "I'll leave it to you, Hiro-chan," and handed the sword to Furu-Koga. Koga decapitated Mishima in one stroke, following the ancient tradition of leaving only a thin layer of skin on the neck. Then, Chibi-Koga used the tantō that Mishima had been holding to cut off the skin of Mishima's neck from his body. During this process, Masahiro Ogawa kept watch near the main entrance door of the room to make sure that the JSDF staff officers would not interfere with Mishima's seppuku.

Next, Morita also took off his uniform jacket, sat seiza-style next to Mishima's body, and committed seppuku, signaling "Not yet" and "Okay," and upon receiving the signal, Furu-Koga, the kaishakunin, decapitated Morita in one stroke. Afterwards, Chibi-Koga, Ogawa, and Furu-Koga turned the bodies of Mishima and Morita over onto their backs, covered them with their uniforms, and lined up their heads. The General Mashita called to the three, "How about you all worship them?" and, "How about you turn yourself in police?"

The three men removed the ropes from the General Mashita's feet and said, "By order of Mishima Sensei, we will escort you until you are handed over to the JSDF staff officers." When the General Mashita asked, "I won't go wild. Are you going to put me out in front of the people with my hands tied?", the three obediently released him from all restraints. Seeing the three join their hands in prayer toward the heads of Mishima and Morita, and shed tears in silence, the General Mashita said, "Cry as much as you can..." and sat seiza-style, closed his eyes and joined his hands in prayer, saying, "Let me pray for their souls as well."

For Mashita, this was the second time he had witnessed a seppuku. During the war, Mashita served as a staff officer in the Imperial Japanese Army, and just after the war ended he was once asked for observer of the committing seppuku, from his close friend and colleague, Major Makoto Haruke (晴気誠).

A little after 12:20 pm, Ogawa and Furu-Koga came out from the front entrance of the Commandant General's office, supporting the General Mashita from either side, and Chibi-Koga came out into the hallway carrying the Japanese sword, "Seki Magoroku". The three handed the General Mashita to Colonel Yoshimatsu, handed over the Japanese sword, and were arrested on the spot by officers from Ushigome Police Station (牛込警察署).

Perhaps out of kindness, the police officers did not handcuff the three who were held out their hands. As they were being taken away in a patrol car from the main entrance where a crowd of reporters was waiting, some JSDF officers punched the three on the head, so the police officer stopped them, shouting, "You idiots! What are you doing?"

At 12:23 pm, the police chief entered the Commandant General's office and confirmed the two deaths. Before then, "You were close to Yukio Mishima, weren't you? Go there immediately and persuade him to stop," Security Chief Kuniyasu Tsuchida (土田國保) had instructed to Atsuyuki Sassa (佐々淳行), counselor of the Police Affairs Department (警務部, Keimu bu) and chief of the First Personnel Division. Sassa rushed to the scene from the Tokyo Metropolitan Police Department, but was too late in time to stop Mishima from committing suicide. Sassa has recalled what happened when he entered the Commandant General's office to see Mishima's body: "The carpet under my feet made a squelching sound. I looked and saw a sea of blood. The carpet was red, so at first, I couldn't tell it was blood. I can still remember that eerie feeling."

The General Mashita, who was made a hostage, later spoke in court, "I didn't feel hate towards the defendants even at that time," and has added, "Thinking about the country of Japan, thinking about the JSDF, the pure hearts of thinking about our country that did that kind of thing, I want to buy it as an individual."

Among their belongings found at the scene were six strips of paper (短冊, tanzaku) with death poems written on them: two by Mishima, one by Morita, and one each by the remaining members. Although the plan called for Chibi-Koga, Furu-Koga and Ogawa to live, there was always the possibility of something unforeseen developing which might require them also to die. Their death poems are as follows:

益荒男が たばさむ太刀の 鞘鳴りに 幾とせ耐へて 今日の初霜

(Masurao ga Tabasamu tachi no Sayanari ni Ikutose taete Kyō no hatsushimo)
The sheaths of swords rattle / As after years of endurance / Brave men set out / To tread upon the first frost of the year.

For how many years / Has the warrior endured / The rattling of / The sword he wears at his side: / The first fall of frost came today. (Translated by Donald Keene)
— Yukio Mishima, Death Poem

散るをいとふ 世にも人にも さきがけて 散るこそ花と 吹く小夜嵐

(Chiru wo itou Yo ni mo Hito ni mo Sakigakete Chiru koso Hana to Fuku Sayoarashi)
A small night storm blows / Saying 'falling is the essence of a flower' / Preceding those who hesitate.

Storm winds at night blow / The message that to fall before / The world and before men / By whom falling is dreaded / Is the mark of a flower. (Translated by Donald Keene)
— Yukio Mishima, Death Poem

今日にかけて かねて誓ひし 我が胸の 思ひを知るは 野分のみかは

(Kyō ni kakete Kanete chikaishi Waga mune no Omoi wo shiruwa Nowaki nomi kawa)

I have been betting to this day / And have made a vow for a long time to today / I wonder if only the autumn storm would know, (maybe someone would know) / Of the feelings in my heart. (Note: A few days before the Mishima incident, there was an autumn storm (野分, nowaki) in Tokyo at night.)
— Masakatsu Morita, Death Poem

火と燃ゆる 大和心を はるかなる 大みこころの 見そなはすまで

(Hi to moyuru Yamato gokoro wo Haruka naru Ōmikokoro no Misonawasu made)

My Yamato-damashii, / Burns like fire, / And it will keep burning / Until the far away Emperor's heart could see it.
— Masayoshi Koga, Death Poem

雲をらび しら雪さやぐ 富士の根の 歌の心ぞ もののふの道

(Kumo orabi Shirayuki sayagu Fuji no ne no Uta no kokoro zo Mononofu no michi)

The howling of clouds, / The rustling of white snow, / Seen from the foot of Mount Fuji, / This is the spirit of the song, / The path of warriors.
— Masahiro Ogawa, Death Poem

獅子となり 虎となりても 国のため ますらをぶりも 神のまにまに

(Shisi to nari Tora to naritemo Kuni no tame Masurao buri mo Kami no manima ni)

Even if I become a lion, / Or a tiger, / For the sake of my country / My behaving strong and brave man as a Japanese sword, / On God's command.
— Hiroyasu Koga, Death Poem

Masakatsu Morita died at the age of 25, preferred to pronounce his first-name "Certain victory" (必勝, Hisshō) in on'yomi rather than "Masakatsu" in kun'yomi.

=== Aftermath of the day ===
Of the roughly 30 Tatenokai members held under police guard at Ichigaya Hall, several of Morita's friends became agitated on hearing of the incident, fiercely resisted and demanded to head to the scene, leading to three of them – Kenichi Tanaka, Takemi Imai (今井丈美), and Shunichi Nishio (西尾俊一) – were arrested for obstruction of justice. The members who remained in the hall were asked to them, and after lining up and singing the national anthem "Kimigayo", and chanted "Long live the Emperor!" three times, they were taken to Yotsuya Police Station.

Mishima's father, Azusa Hiraoka (平岡梓), learned of the incident on the noon news on television and was watching the screen intently. He misread the kanji characters "beheaded" (介錯, kaishaku), "died" (死亡, shibō) in the news flash captions, "介錯" (kaishaku) for "care" (介抱, kaihō), and was upset and resented the doctor, wondering why his son died despite being given care. Meanwhile, Mishima's mother, Shizue (倭文重), and his wife, Yōko (瑤子), who heard about the situation while out, rushed home, and the family was thrown into chaos as if it were a bolt from the blue. Yōko was so shocked that she took to bed.

Shortly after 12:30 p.m., an Eastern Army Headquarters press conference erupted into confusion when a Metropolitan Police Department official announced that the two men had died by suicide. Reporters pressed for confirmation until groans and murmurs spread through the room at the news that both had been decapitated. Colonel Yoshimatsu recounted the incident to reporters, who pressed him about the extraordinary details of the seppuku and kaishaku. When one asked whether the head had been severed from the body, Yoshimatsu confirmed it. The reporters then hurried outside to file their reports. Henry Scott-Stokes was also present at the press conference as the only foreign reporter.

The shocking news of the coup call and subsequent seppuku suicide by Mishima – an author active in various fields and widely known as a Nobel Prize in Literature candidate – was simultaneously broadcast as a breaking news report on television and radio both in Japan and abroad, while newspapers issued special editions. Broadcasters quickly replaced regular programming with special coverage and discussions among intellectuals and commentators. Over nine right-wing groups flocked to the front of the Camp Ichigaya.

At a press conference held at the Defense Agency from 12:30 pm, Minister of Defense Yasuhiro Nakasone called the incident "a very regrettable incident" and criticized Mishima's actions as "an enormous nuisance" and "destructive to democratic order." Prime Minister Eisaku Satō, who heard the news at the Prime Minister's Office, was also surrounded by reporters and commented, "I can only think that he has gone mad. This is out of the ordinary." Until then, Nakasone and Satō had viewed Mishima's trial enlistment in the JGSDF favorably as a positive PR opportunity for the JSDF, but after the incident they made critical remarks in their positions as politicians. (Note: Incidentally, in Eisaku Satō's diary for that day, he wrote, "It was an honorable way to die, but the place and method were unacceptable. We lost a great man, but violence is absolutely unacceptable." And, about 20 years later, Nakasone has commented on his feelings at the time, "I thought that this was not an aesthetic incident or artistic martyrdom, but a death in rage against the times, a death as an ideological remonstrance. However, as the Caigentan says, 'Sticking to your beliefs and maintaining your integrity requires rigor and illumination, yet you must not become violent.'" And Nakasone added, "At the time, it was not the time to indulge in my personal emotions.")

One British journalist, after hearing the words of politicians such as Nakasone and Satō, tearfully told a literary critic Takeshi Muramatsu (村松剛), "Why is there not a single politician who defends Mishima? Mishima has never seemed so great and Japanese politicians have never seemed so small."

After being released, General Mashita appeared before the JSDF personnel and greeted them, waving his left hand high and saying, "I'm sorry for the inconvenience, but as you can see, I'm doing fine. Please don't worry." The personnel responded with cheers of "That's great, that's great" and "All right, you did your best" and then a burst of applause. A Tokyo Shimbun reporter who was covering the scene said that he found the scene unbearable, and wrote the newspaper column about his sense of discomfort with the group's behavior, which was not like that of a "military" group.

Of course, their behaviors were not a mourning for Mishima's suicide. And not a condemnation of the actions of Mishima and others who challenged democracy, nor was it a round of applause indicative of a determination to remain committed to the military of a peaceful nation. It was, so to speak, a sign of back-patting for the "president" who had escaped from the captivity of thugs, and a sign of the team spirit of salarymen.
Instructions were given over the microphone to the remaining JSDF personnel. "Everyone, please go back to work. Please do so," the voice said in a pleading tone, but the personnel showed no signs of leaving. (Omitted) The salaryman-like unity and the disorder state of the JSDF was inadvertently exposed.

— Tokyo Shimbun, Column (November 25, 1970)

Yasunari Kawabata who was close to Mishima, received the news of the incident while out, (Note: When he was informed of the news of Mishima Incident, Yasunari Kawabata was attending the funeral of Moritatsu Hosokawa (細川護立) at Aoyama Funeral Hall (青山葬儀所, Aoyama sougijo) in Minami-Aoyama, Minato-ku, Tokyo.) and at around 1:20 pm, rushed to the Eastern Army Headquarters, but was unable to approach the Commandant General's office as the police were investigating the scene. Surrounded by reporters, Kawabata, looking stunned and exhausted, said, "I am simply shocked. I never imagined something like this would happen – It's a shame he died in this way." Shintaro Ishihara, who was a member of the House of Councillors at the time, also visited the Eastern Army Headquarters but did not enter the office. Ishihara commented to the assembled press corps, "It can only be described as modern-day madness," and "It was a very fruitless act that risked his young lives."

At 2:00 pm, the Tokyo Metropolitan Police Department set up the "Special Investigation Headquarters for the Case of the Tatenokai's Infiltration into the JSDF, Illegal Confinement, and Seppuku Suicide" within Ushigome Police Station.

One of the JSDF highest-ranking officers concluded his impressions of that day by saying, "The reaction of the JSDF personnel after learning of Mishima's suicide changed completely. Everyone was vague in their words, remained silent with complicated expressions, and seemed stunned. They probably never expected that he would commit suicide. The shock seems to be great."

Sergeant K, who had seen Mishima's speech, spoke briefly, "When I heard that he had committed seppuku, I stood there for about an hour, losing myself in my thoughts." Staff Office Major T also spoke, "I never thought he would die! It was a terrible shock. I had been listening to the speech the whole time, but I could hardly hear it because of the heckling from the younger soldiers. If he was risking his life for words, we should have listened quietly."

At 5:15 pm, Mishima and Morita's heads were each placed in plastic bags, for autopsy, also their bodies were placed in caskets and transported from Camp Ichigaya to Ushigome Police Station, where the bodies were placed. Some ethnic nationalist students and other right-wing groups came to the Police Station to pay their respects, and a temporary altar was set up, but it was soon removed.

The Asahi Shimbun evening paper that day carried a secretly taken photograph showing Mishima and Morita's heads illuminated by the sunlight streaming in through the window.

Shortly after 10 pm, the Metropolitan Police Department began searches of Mishima's residence and Morita's apartment. Mishima's house was searched until around 4 am the following day, November 26. In Mishima's study room, in addition to letters addressed to family, friends, the Tatenokai members, acquaintances including Ivan Morris and Donald Keene, on his desk were found clippings from Promise that I haven't been Fulfilled: 25 years in me (果たし得てゐない約束―私の中の二十五年, Hatashi ete inai Yakusoku: Watashi no naka no 25 nen) (Sankei Shimbun, July 7, 1970, issue) and One Hundred People Who Will Changing the World of the 1970s: Yukio Mishima (Asahi Shimbun, September 22, 1970, issue), and a suicide note-like memo was also found, which read, "If life is limited, I would like to live forever. Mishima Yukio."

A large number of reporters were crowded on the street in front of the closed gate of Mishima's residence, and behind them, female students who were Mishima fans could be seen crying and embracing each other's shoulders. And a group of ethnic nationalist male students in stand-up collared school uniforms stood for a long time, upright and motionless, cheeks wet with tears, trying to hold back sobs.

=== Autopsy, physical evidence, and arrest charges ===
On the following day, November 26, Professor Ginjiro Saitō (斎藤銀次郎) performed an autopsy on Mishima's body, and Professor Tadataka Funao (船尾忠孝) performed an autopsy on Morita's body in the forensic autopsy room of Keio University Hospital (慶應義塾大学病院), from 11:20 am to 1:25 pm. The autopsies determined that the cause of death for both men was "Disconnection of the neck due to a split wound," with the following findings:

Yukio Mishima:
His neck was cut at least three times, with cuts measuring 7 cm, 6 cm, 4 cm and 3 cm. There is an 11.5cm cut on his right shoulder where the sword appears to have missed, and a small chip cut under his left jaw.
His abdomen was cut 5.5cm to the right and 8.5cm to the left, centered on his navel, and was 4cm deep. The left cut reached his small intestine, and ran in a straight line from left to right.
Height 163cm. 45 years old, but has the developed youthful muscles of a 30-something. Brain weighs 1,440g. Blood type A.

— Ginjiro Saitō, Autopsy report (November 26, 1970)

Masakatsu Morita:
The area between the third and fourth cervical vertebrae was cut off with a single slash. The wound on his abdomen was horizontal from left to right, 7cm to the left of his navel, 4cm deep, from there a shallow cut 5.4cm to the right, and a cut 5cm to the right of his navel. A small 0.5cm cut on his right shoulder.
Height 167cm. A young, beautiful body.

— Tadataka Funao, Autopsy report (November 26, 1970)

Mishima committed seppuku in such a dignified manner that about 50 centimeters of his small intestine was exposed. In addition, a sword from kaishaku hit his jaw, shattering his molars, and there were traces of him trying to bite off his tongue.

According to a police inspection, the Japanese sword "Seki Magoroku" used in the kaishaku was bent in an S-shape from the middle to the tip due to the impact of the kaishaku. Also, a former Imperial Japanese Army Sergeant Hiroshi Funasaka (舩坂弘), the president of Shibuya's Taiseidō Bookstore (大盛堂書店) and the donor of "Seki Magoroku", saw during questioning at Ushigome Police Station that both ends of the rivet of the sword hilt (目釘, mekugi) had been crushed to prevent the blade from being pulled out.

Sword appraisal expert Magoki Watanabe (渡部真吾樹) determined that the sword crest on Mishima's sword is not "Three Cedar Trees (三本杉, Sanbonsugi)", but "Mutual Confusion (互の目乱れ, Gunome-midare)," and that the base fabric of the sword is quite soft, different from the method used by "Seki Magoroku". In addition to Watanabe, other experts have asserted that the sword is not a genuine "Seki Magoroku", and there have also been investigations into the sword's place of origin and provenances, leading to a persistent theory that Mishima had been tricked and given a fake.

The belongings of Masayoshi Koga, Masahiro Ogawa, and Hiroyasu Koga included the Written Directive that Mishima had given each of them, 30,000 yen each in cash (for attorney's fees), one special baton each, a climbing knife, etc. The Written Directive (命令書, meirei sho) to Masayoshi Koga mainly contained the following words:

Your mission is to escort the hostages together with comrade Hiroyasu Koga, and after safely delivering them, be arrested as a criminal and make an honorable statement in court about the spirit of the Tatenokai.
This incident was planned, devised, and ordered by Mishima, the captain of the Tatenokai, and student leader Masakatsu Morita participated in it. Mishima's suicide with a sword (自刃, jijin) is only natural given my responsibilities as captain, but Masakatsu Morita's jijin is a brave and solemn act that he voluntarily represents all Tatenokai members and the current patriotically motivating young people of Japan, also sets an example and try to demonstrating the spirit of youth to which should be able to make the fierce god (鬼神, oni-gami) weep.
Regardless of Mishima, you should spread Morita's spirit to later generations.

— Yukio Mishima, Written Directive

The three suspects, Masayoshi Koga, Masahiro Ogawa, and Hiroyasu Koga, were sent to prosecutors on November 27 on suspicion of six offenses: Participation in Assisted Suicide; Consensual Homicide (嘱託殺人), Unlawful Capture and Confinement (不法監禁), Criminal Injury (傷害), Assault, Breaking into a Residence (建造物侵入), Possession of Firearms or Swords and Other Such Weapons. On December 17, they were indicted on five offenses: Participation in Assisted Suicide; Consensual Homicide, Criminal Injury, Unlawful Capture and Confinement Causing in Injury (監禁致傷), Assault, Obstructing or Compelling Performance of Public Duty (職務強要).

== Aftermath ==
=== Reactions ===
Reactions to the incident came from a wide range of people, including newspaper reports, relations of the Self-Defense Forces, political activists, writers and cultural figures.

=== Funerals, memorials and trials ===
==== November 26 to the December 1970 ====
After an autopsy was completed at Keio University Hospital on November 26, the day after the incident, the heads and bodies of both Mishima and Morita's corpses were neatly sutured.

Just before 3 pm, Mishima's corpse was handed over to his younger brother, Chiyuki Hiraoka (平岡千之), in the morgue, and Morita's corpse was handed over to his older brother, Osamu Morita (森田治). Morita's corpse was immediately cremated at a crematorium in Yoyogi, Shibuya-ku. Osamu recollected that his younger brother's dead face looked as if he was sleeping peacefully.

A little after 3:30 pm, Mishima's corpse was taken from the hospital to his home in a police car. His father, Azusa Hiraoka, looked into the coffin, being afraid to see how his son's appearance had changed. However, he found his son's head and body had been sutured neatly, dressed in the Tatenokai uniform, with a guntō firmly clutched at his chest, and his dead face was, to which makeup had been beautifully applied, looked as if he were alive. The Tatenokai uniform and guntō were in accordance with Mishima's will that he entrusted to his friend, Kinemaro Izawa (伊沢甲子麿), and the funeral makeup was applied with special care by police officers on a voluntary, they saying, "We applied the makeup carefully with special feelings, because it is the body of Mishima Sensei, whom we have always respected secretly."

On 27, the next day was friend-pulling day (友引, Tomobiki), a day when crematoriums were closed, so it was decided to hold a private funeral on 26, this day. Several editors from publishing companies asked the family if they could make his death mask, but they were told that this would not be necessary, so this was not done. Mishima's private funeral was held at his home, and in addition to his relatives, Yasunari Kawabata, Kinemaro Izawa, Takeshi Muramatsu, Takeo Matsuura (松浦竹夫), Shōhei Ōoka, Shintaro Ishihara, Hyōe Murakami (村上兵衛), Seiji Tsutsumi, Takamitsu Masuda (増田貴光), Takao Tokuoka and others came to pay their respects. At the foot of the statue of Apollo in the garden of Mishima's residence, about 30 crimson roses had been thrown in memory of Mishima by his fans.

Azusa put the manuscript papers and fountain pen that his son cherished in the casket together, and his casket left the home just after 4 pm. At that time, his mother, Shizue, stroked the face of his casket with her fingers and said, "Goodbye, Kōi (公威)-san." (Note: At that moment, Shizue actually wanted to say, "Kōi-san, you did a great job," but hesitated because she was afraid the other mourners would think she was dramatic.) Mishima's body was cremated at 6:10 pm at Kirigaya Funeral Hall (桐ヶ谷斎場) in Shinagawa. (Note: In his will, Mishima wrote that he wanted to divided his bones, and these partially buried in a location with a view of Mount Fuji and the ocean, and the bronze statue, which he had made by Junji Wakebe (分部順治) while he was alive, put up there, so his family members divided his bones. The bones were kept by the head priest of an old Zen temple in the Kannami area of Shizuoka Prefecture, who had connections with the Hiraoka family, but the bronze statue was not kept there. The bronze statue was first unveiled three years after Mishima's death, and as of 2017 was kept in a local government facility along with other Junji Wakabe's works. Where his divided bones are currently buried is kept strictly secret, and no one can visit there and bow without the consent of his family members.) The following day, on 27, Shizue told a mourner who came to the Hiraoka home to light incense for the repose of Mishima's soul, with a bouquet of white roses, "You should have brought red roses for a celebration. This was the first time in his life Kōi did something he always wanted to do. Please be happy for him."

On 26, the same day, at the main gate of Waseda University, where Masakatsu Morita studied, a large signboard mourning Mishima and Morita was erected by the "Japan Students' League" (日本学生同盟, Nihon Gakusei Dōmei) and the Waseda University National Defense Club, and portraits of the two men and an incense burner were also placed there.

Morita's wake (通夜, tuya) was also held by the Tatenokai members at around 6 pm on November 26 at Shōtoku-san Taichō-ji Temple (聖徳山諦聴寺) in Yoyogi. Morita's bones, which Osamu had divided to Tatenokai members, were placed on the altar. (Note: Morita's divided bones remained in the apartment in Juunisou where Morita had been living for a while after the wake, but when the members who had lived with Morita moved out of the apartment, they decided to return them to Morita's older brother Osamu, and went to Yokkaichi-shi, Mie Prefecture to deliver them. On the way, they stayed overnight at Nanzen-ji in Kyoto, where they took out some of Morita's bones, each taking turns nibbling a little and then swallowing it, so as not to forget Morita's last wishes.) Morita's posthumous Buddhist name was Jishōin Shaku Shintetsu Hisshō Koji ("慈照院釈真徹必勝居士"). At the wake, Mishima's suicide note, addressed to all Tatenokai members, was circulated around and everyone read it. Some of the members suggested that if one member committed suicide every year, it would be possible to continue making an appeal to society. Morita's second wake was held the following day, November 27, at his family home in Yokkaichi-shi, Mie Prefecture, and the funeral was held on November 28 at Sea Star (海の星, Umi no Hoshi) Catholic Church, at the request of his Catholic brother Osamu, and Morita's cremains were interred at around 4 pm. Mishima's younger brother, Chiyuki, attended the funeral.

On November 30, the Buddhist memorial service for "7th day after death bardo" (初七日, sho-nanoka) was held at Mishima's home. In his will to his parents, Mishima had stated, "My funeral must be Shinto, but the Hiraoka family's funeral can be Buddhist rite." Also, regarding his posthumous Buddhist name, he had said in his will, "I want the character 'Martial' to be included the name. The character 'Literature (文, Bun)' is unnecessary." However, his family, feeling that "he had grown up as a man of literature (文人, bunjin)," decided to include the character '文' under the character '武', and so his posthumous Buddhist name became Shobuin Bunkan Kōi Koji ("彰武院文鑑公威居士").

On December 11, the "Yukio Mishima Memorial Evening" was held at Toshima Public Hall (豊島公会堂) in Ikebukuro by an executive committee headed by Fusao Hayashi. This was the origin of the "Patriotism Memorial" (憂国忌, Yūkoku-ki) memorial service, which would later become an annual event on Mishima's deathday. The hosts were Kōhan Kawauchi and Taisuke Fujishima (藤島泰輔) who was a schoolmate of Crown Prince Akihito, and the executive committee was made up of minzoku-ha students from the "Japan Students' League" and other groups. Over 3,000 people gathered (the organizers said it was 5,000) at the memorial. The venue, that has a capacity of 500 people, was overflowing, and many people also gathered in nearby Nakaikebukuro Park (中池袋公園), where they listened to eulogies from attendees broadcast over special speakers covering the situation inside the venue, as well as Mishima's speech before his suicide, which was recorded at the scene of the incident.

==== January to February 1971 ====
The following year, on January 12, 1971, the Buddhist memorial service for the "49th day after death bardo" (四十九日, Shiju-ku nichi) was held at the Hiraoka family home. On the same day, a "Gathering to remember Mr. Yukio Mishima" was held at the Sankei Hall in Osaka, organized by 10 people including Fusao Hayashi, and was attended by approximately 2,000 people. On January 13, Mishima's wife Yōko came to visit the injured JSDF personnel and offered her apologies.

On January 14, that was also Mishima's birthday, his cremains were buried in the grave of the Hiraoka Family (Location: 10th district, 1st class, 13th side, no.32) at Tama Cemetery in Fuchū-shi. As his birthday was 49 days after the day of his suicide, some researchers have speculated that Mishima may had set his period of bardo for reincarnation.

On January 24, a clear, sunny day from the morning, Mishima's funeral and farewell ceremony was held at Tsukiji Hongan-ji from 1 pm. The chief mourner (喪主, moshu) was his wife Yōko Hiraoka, the funeral committee chairman Yasunari Kawabata, and the master of ceremonies was Takeshi Muramatsu. Around 100 of Mishima's relatives, Morita's family, the Tatenokai members and their families, Mishima's acquaintances, and the first 180 general attendees were able to attend. The altar was designed by the Ikebana artist, Tōko Adachi (安達瞳子), and was simple, with a portrait of Mishima in a black sports shirt at the center, against a black cloth background, and seven large and small flower spheres made from white chrysanthemums.

The memorial addresses (弔辞, chōji) were delivered by eight persons; Funahashi Seiichi (who was replaced by Makoto Hōjō (北條誠) halfway through due to his eye disease), Taijun Takeda, Eikoh Hosoe, the president of Shinchosha Ryōichi Satō (佐藤亮一), Eiko Muramatsu (村松英子), Kinemaro Izawa, a film producer Hiroaki Fujii (藤井浩明), Sazō Idemitsu. Eiko Muramatsu, an actress of Mishima's troupe, sobbed as she paid tribute to her mentor on behalf of the theatrical world.

To me, you were an irreplaceable mentor. Your blood painted the whole polluted skies of modern Japan in brilliant color like a burning rainbow in the evening glow. (Omitted)
Sensei, you were always caring us, without showing it. You showed us the possibility of simultaneously possessing burning passion and a cool-headed intellect. Your clear flame was the light that always guided us. (Omitted) That beautiful flame that you lit with your own body will never go out, but will continue to burn above the heads of those who love and respect you.

— Eiko Muramatsu, Chōji

Other attendees included Taisuke Fujishima, Kishin Shinoyama, Tadanori Yokoo, Toshiro Mayuzumi, Hiroshi Akutagawa, Kosuke Gomi, Nobuo Nakamura, Akiyuki Nosaka, Yasushi Inoue, Masatoshi Nakayama, and Takao Tokuoka. The British Broadcasting Corporation (BBC) had expressed a desire to broadcast Mishima's funeral live, but the organizing committee declined. Prime Minister Eisaku Satō's wife Hiroko (寛子) had also expressed a desire to attend the funeral in disguise by helicopter, but she could not attend by security concerns due to a rumor that far-left forces would attack the funeral hall.

A temporary nursing facility and a toilet car were set up at the funeral hall, and 100 plainclothes and uniformed police officers, 50 riot police, and 46 security guards were on guard. Over 8,200 members of the public attended the ceremony, paying their respects at a large portrait of Mishima placed at the entrance to the hall. Fans of Mishima ranged from former soldiers to office ladies. Among them was a group of companies that came from Nagoya to attend, raising flags reading "In Memory of Yukio Mishima." This made it the largest funeral ever for a literary figure. The next day, on January 25, the chairman Hiromi Tamagawa (玉川博己) of "Japan Students' League" announced its plan to launch the "Yukio Mishima Study Group" (三島由紀夫研究会, Mishima Yukio Kenkyūkai), and the inaugural meeting was held on February 26, at the Arcadia Ichigaya Private Academy (私学会館, Shigaku Kaikan) in Ichigaya. Shinjuku-ku.

On January 30, an unveiling ceremony was held for the "Memorial Monument of Honor Yukio Mishima & Masakatsu Morita Martyrs" erected in front of the entrance to Matsue Nihon University High School (now Rissho University Sounan High School) in Matsue-shi, Shimane Prefecture. The words "Sincerity (誠, Makoto)," "Restoration (維新, Ishin)," "Patriotism (憂国, Yūkoku)," and "Constitutional amendment (改憲, Kaiken)" were inscribed on the monument.

On February 11, National Foundation Day, a "Memorial service in memory of Yukio Mishima" was held in the grounds of Hachiman Shrine in Kakogawa-shi, Hyogo Prefecture, where Mishima's grandfather's permanent domicile, by members of the local Seicho-no-Ie (now split into the Seicho-no-Ie Mainstream Movement (生長の家本流運動))

On February 28, the Tatenokai's dissolution ceremony was held at the Shinto Misogi Society (神道禊大教会) in Nishi-Nippori (西日暮里), Arakawa-ku, attended by Mishima's wife Yōko and 75 members. Yōko's family, the Sugiyama family, had deep ties to Shinto and connections to the Shinto Misogi Daikyokai, so the ceremony was held there. Kiyoshi Kuramochi (倉持清), a 1st generation member and the leader of 2nd team, read the "Statement", and announced the dissolution of the Tatenokai, conveying the contents of Mishima's will, in which stated, "With the uprising, the Tatenokai will be dissolved." The Japanese swords that Mishima had given to each team leader and that had been kept at the Dojo Saineikan (済寧館) in the Imperial Palace were given to each team leader as keepsakes, through Yōko's consideration.

==== March to December 1971 ====
On March 23, the first court hearing of the "Tatenokai Incident" trial was held in Courtroom 701 of the Tokyo District Court. In addition to the families of the three defendants, and Azusa Hiraoka, Yōko, and lawyer Naokazu Saitō (斎藤直一), the executor of Mishima's will, attended the hearing. The presiding judge was Osamu Kushibuchi (櫛淵理). The associate judges were Yoshiaki Ishii (石井義明) and Fumio Motoi (本井文夫), the prosecutors were Kazuo Ishii (石井和男) and Toshio Koyama (小山利男), the chief defense lawyer was Asanosuke Kusaka (草鹿浅之介).

The presiding judge, Kushibuchi, was a man of both literary and martial arts (文武両道, bunbu ryōdō), who practiced the Shinto single-mindedness style (神道一心流, Sinto Isshin-ryu) of swordsmanship, learned to read Classical Chinese from an early age, and was well versed in Yangmingism, which also influenced Mishima. In preparation for this trial, Kushibuchi thoroughly read Mishima's books on Yangmingism and Hagakure (Wang Yangming Thought as Revolutionary Philosophy (革命哲学としての陽明学, Kakumei Tetsugaku toshite no Yomeigaku), and On Hagakure: The Samurai Ethic and Modern Japan (葉隠入門, Hagakure Nyūmon) etc.), and focused on the connection between Yangmingism and revolutionary thought.

On June 26, at the strong request of French fans of Mishima's literature, including Gabriel Matzneff, a memorial service "Paris Yūkoku-ki" (パリ憂国忌) was held in Paris, where the poet Emmanuel Rothen recited a poem dedicated to Mishima, The Ritual of Love and Death (Patriotism). The poem was also introduced and recited by Mishima's friend Toshiro Mayuzumi during the trial in response to a question about Mishima's reputation abroad.

On July 7, two days after the seventh court hearing, the three defendants, Masayoshi Koga, Masahiro Ogawa, and Hiroyasu Koga, were released on bail. As they had admitted to the crimes and there was no risk of them destroying evidence or fleeing, the three were released from the Tokyo Detention House at 5 pm and were greeted by Yōko. They held a press conference at the Akasaka Prince Hotel from 7 pm.

On September 20, while visiting the grave, Yōko noticed something unusual about the position of the tombstone. The next day, on 21, a worker from the Tachibanaya Stonemasonry opened the interred part and found that Mishima's cremains had been lost along with the cinerary urn, and reported the matter to the Fuchū Police Station (府中警察署). On December 5 of the same year, the stolen cinerary urn was discovered buried about 40 meters away from the Hiraoka family grave. The cremains were in their original condition, as well as, were the cigars that had been placed with them.

On November 25, the unveiling ceremony for the "Mishima Yukio Literary Monument" was held in the garden of the home of Kiyotaka Miyazaki (宮崎清隆), who was a former Kempeitai Sergeant Major, in Ōmiya-shi, Saitama Prefecture (now Saitama-shi, Saitama Prefecture). The calligraphy (揮毫, kigō) was by Yōko Hiraoka (Sign name was Yōko Mishima). A message that Mishima sent to Miyazaki during his lifetime was published in the "Bookmark of the Yukio Mishima Literary Monument". On the same day, the Hiraoka family held a Shinto-style first death anniversary service at the Palace Hotel in 1 Marunouchi 1-chōme, Chiyoda-ku. In addition to the former Tatenokai members, Tatsumi Hijikata and Akihiro Maruyama also attended this one-year memorial.

The 14th court hearing was held on December 6, and Minister of Defense Yasuhiro Nakasone, who was the chairman of the Liberal Democratic Party's General Affairs Committee, took the stand to testify. Nakasone stated that when he said "it's an enormous nuisance" immediately after the incident, he was speaking in his capacity as a public figure, and that he did it to prevent any disturbances within the JSDF. He also stated that while he did not fully agree with Mishima's views, he believed that Mishima had done it "with the unavoidable Yamato-damashii, knowing that this would happen if he did this," and that he wanted to accept and digest the incident in his own way as a politician, said that "I feel more compassion than hatred."

==== 1972 ====
On April 16, 1972, Yasunari Kawabata committed suicide in his study room at Zushi Marina Apartment in Zushi-shi, Kanagawa Prefecture. That was the day he was scheduled to hand over the preface to his disciple for the Judicial record of the "Mishima Incident" to be published in May, but the preface had been not written. (Note: Munekatsu Date, who had asked Kawabata to write the preface, later reflected that this may have been the trigger that drove Kawabata to commit suicide.)

On April 27, 1972, the 18th and final court hearing of the "Tatenokai Incident" trial, in which a variety of people such as Yasuhiro Nakasone, Takeshi Muramatsu, and Toshiro Mayuzumi had testified as witnesses from the first to the 17th court hearing, was held, and three men, Masayoshi Koga, Masahiro Ogawa, and Hiroyasu Koga, were sentenced to four years in prison sentence. The offenses were "Unlawful Capture and Confinement Causing in Injury (監禁致傷), Violation of the Law concerning Punishment of Physical Violence and Others (暴力行為等処罰ニ関スル法律), Criminal Injury, Obstructing or Compelling Performance of Public Duty, and Participation in Assisted Suicide; Consensual Homicide."

When asked by the presiding judge what they planned to do in the future, all three answered, "My life ended on November 25, 1970. I haven't thought about what I would do after that." In the same year, 1972, an ethnic nationalist group called Issuikai (meaning to hold regular meetings on the first Wednesday of every month) was formed, centered around Tsutomu Abe (阿部勉), who had been a 1st generation Tatenokai member.

And, since 1972, a memorial service "Nowaki-sai" (野分祭) named by Tsutomu Abe after Morita's death poem has been held annually on November 24, sponsored by Issuikai and Yoshio Itō (伊藤好雄) who had been a 1st generation Tatenokai member as a celebrant. The reason the memorial service is held the day before, rather than on the anniversary of his death, is to reflect on Morita's state of mind as he was about to uprise the next day.

==== 1973 to 1979 ====
On July 24, 1973, former Commander, General Kanetoshi Mashita, died of intestinal obstruction at the age of 59. According to Mashita's eldest son, Kanehiro (兼弘), Mashita did not resent Mishima until the latter end, and yearned him calling "Mishima-san."

About two and a half years later of the sentence day to four years in prison, in October 1974, the three were released before the end of their four-year sentences. After their release, the three went to meet and apologize to the JSDF officers who were injured in the incident, together with Morita's older brother Osamu.

After Hiroyasu Koga was released, he studied Shinto at Kokugakuin (國學院) and qualified as a Shinto priest at Tsurumi Shrine (鶴見神社) in Tsurumi-ku, Osaka-shi, Osaka Prefecture. Other former Tatenokai members began to gather at the place where Koga and 2 others held the memorial service for Mishima and Morita at same name shrine in Kanagawa Prefecture, from then on, "Memorial services for Mishima and Morita," conducted only by the former Tatenokai members, began to be held every year.

After that, the "Mishima Morita Office" was established as a liaison office between the former members and the Hiraoka family. Kuninori Itō (伊藤邦典), who had been a 1st generation member and was a friend of Hiroyasu Koga, when met him in person after his release from prison, asked him, "What did that incident leave you with?" Koga simply turned his palms up and stared at them as if he was holding the weight of something as the weight of Mishima's and Morita's heads.

On March 29, 1975, Ichirō Murakami (村上一郎), a writer who, like Mishima, viewed the February 26 incident in a positive light and who had strong sympathy for the Mishima Incident, committed suicide slashing the carotid artery in his own throat with a Japanese sword at his home.

On December 16, 1976, Mishima's father, Azusa Hiraoka, died of cirrhosis of the liver at the age of 82.

On March 3, 1977, two former Tatenokai members, Yoshio Itō (a 1st generation member) and Shunichi Nishio (a 4th generation member and friend of Morita), participated in the Keidanren attack incident (経団連襲撃事件) leading by Shūsuke Nomura. After being persuaded by Yōko, they surrendered and the incident came to an end.

==== 1980 to 2009 ====
In January 1980, an ideological group called the Kouryu-kai (蛟龍会) was founded by several former Tatenokai members, including Kiyoshi Kuramochi.

On August 9, 1980, the Asahi Shimbun newspaper carried the full text of Mishima's suicide note addressed to Kiyoshi Kuramochi, a 1st generation Tatenokai member, in which he apologized for being unable to act as matchmaker at Kuramochi's wedding due to the incident. On November 24 of the same year, Colonel Kiyokatsu Yamamoto (山本舜勝), a former instructor at the Nakano School during the war and Mishima's instructor in JGSDF, and several former members of Tatenokai held a "10th Anniversary Memorial Service for the Martyrs Yukio Mishima and Masakatsu Morita" at the Arcadia Ichigaya Private Academy in Ichigaya. Shinjuku-ku.

The inaugural issue of the weekly photo magazine Friday, published in November 1984, featured a close-up of Mishima's severed head. In response, his widow, Yōko, strongly protested to the publisher Kodansha, which prevented publication. In an interview with Munekatsu Date and Takao Tokuoka at the end of the same year, Yōko criticized, "This latest act of photojournalism is the equivalent of a public head hanging (晒し首, sarashi kubi) (in the Edo period). I wonder if the people involved in the editing of that magazine were aware that a public head hanging was a punishment worse than the death penalty."

On October 21, 1987, Mishima's mother, Shizue, died of heart failure at the age of 82. On July 31, 1995, Mishima's wife Yōko, died of heart failure at the age of 58. And, on January 9, 1996, Mishima's younger brother, Chiyuki (千之), died of pneumonia at the age of 65.

Despite many voices of opposition, the building of the Eastern Army Headquarters (Building No. 1), that contained the Commandant General's office at the scene of the Mishima incident, was demolished in 1994, but part of the building, including the Commandant General's office, has been recreated and preserved as the Ichigaya Memorial Museum (市ヶ谷記念館) in another corner of the ground, and three sword marks (刀痕, katana kizu) made by Mishima on a pillar during the fight with the JSDF officers still remain there.

On October 11, 1999, Tsutomu Abe, a founder of Issuikai, died of pancreatic cancer at the age of 53. In late November 1999 and on January 4, 2000, Japanese newspapers carried Mishima's suicide note addressed to all Tatenokai members. On July 18, 2001, Kiyokatsu Yamamoto died at the age of 82.

On April 7 and 8, 2001, a memorial symposium, "Rome Yūkoku-ki" (ローマ憂国忌) was held in Rome, Italy.

==== 2010 to present ====
On November 25, 2010, exactly 40 years since the incident, a "Seimei-gū" (清明宮) was erected at Tsurumi Shrine (鶴見神社), which has the same name as a shrine in Osaka, in Tsurumi-ku, Yokohama-shi, Kanagawa Prefecture, as the shrine that formally enshrines Mishima and Morita by former Tatenokai members. The word "purity and clarity" (清明, Seimei)—a favored term that Mishima wrote on a calligraphy paper when visiting Ōmiwa Shrine in Nara Prefecture to research his novel Runaway Horses—remains preserved at the Sai Shrine (狭井神社) in the sacred grounds of Ōmiwa Shrine, and a stone monument engraved with his "Seimei" (清明) calligraphy was also erected at Seimei-gū within Tsurumi Shrine. (Note: Tsurumi-ku, Yokohama was also home to a bar called "Pony" (仔馬, Kouma) that Mishima often frequented when he was a new writer.)

On September 24, 2013, Hiroshi Mochimaru (持丸博) (whose married family name was Matsuura), a former Tatenokai member and 1st student leader, died of esophageal cancer at the age of 69.

On November 26, 2018, Masahiro Ogawa, a former Tatenokai member and participant in the Mishima Incident, died of heart failure at the age of 70, the day after the anniversary of the deaths of Mishima and Morita. Ogawa's funeral and farewell ceremony was held from 11 am on November 29 at a funeral home in Hamamatsu-shi, Shizuoka Prefecture, where he lived. The chief mourner was his eldest son, Kiichirō (紀一郎). Ogawa referred to Mishima as "Teacher Mishima (三島先生, Mishima Sensei)" throughout his life.

== Background ==
Mishima's relationship with the Japan Self-Defense Forces started in 1966, and after that, the founding of the militia Tatenokai and other events led to the search for a plan to turn the Self-Defense Forces into a national army, which ultimately led to the Mishima Incident.

== Suicide note ==
The suicide note Mishima had written to the Tatenokai member Kiyoshi Kuramochi (whose married family name was Honda), a 1st generation member and the leader of 2nd team, was handed to Kuramochi by Mishima's wife Yōko on the night of the incident. Kuramochi was a person who Mishima trusted, just like the four members who had risen up with Mishima.

Mishima had been asked by Kuramochi to act as the matchmaker at his wedding and he had gladly accepted, so Mishima wrote that it would have been impossible for him to "lead Kuramochi down the path of ruin and death" or to "betray your fiancee and make you act," and he left a will expressing his wish that Kuramochi live a happy life. Kuramochi read the letter in a room in the Mishima residence and was moved to tears by the kindness of his mentor, who had died so concerned about his private life.

My small uprising was the result of much deliberation, and after taking into consideration all the conditions, that I fed our only way into it. At the same time, the way was to one that is predetermined definite death. As someone who had criticized the lack of responsibility of the left-wing students' actions, I had no choice but to take the one path I should take. That is why I had to be extremely strict in selecting the members involved, and I had no choice but to consider keeping them to a very small number and minimizing the number of casualties as much as possible.
How I had longing for and dreaming of rising up for justice together with the all Tatenokai members. However, the situation had already made this impossible, and since that had happened, I thought it would be humanity not to inform non-participants of anything. I in no way think that I have betrayed you guys. (Omitted) I hope that you will understand my feelings, get a job, get married, and make your way through the waves of life, which is like a vast ocean, without forgetting your true ideals as you grow up.

— Yukio Mishima, Letter to Kiyoshi Kuramochi on November 1945

The envelope containing the letter to Kuramochi was enclosed a suicide note addressed to all Tatenokai members too, which was passed around and everyone read, at Masakatsu Morita's wake held on November 26, the day after the incident. The members who read it recalled that they felt Mishima's consideration for those left behind.

Just as I have often tested your aspirations with harsh words, the dream in my mind was for all Tatenokai members to come together, rise up for justice, and realize the ideas of the association. This was the greatest dream of my life. The Tatenokai should have pooled all its strength to return Japan to its true form. (Omitted) Rejecting the empty theories of the revolutionary youth, we have striven for the path of the warrior, with actions spoken before words. If the time had come, the true worth of the Tatenokai could have been proven before the eyes of the entire nation.
However, the right time was not come, and we lost the opportunity to act together for our ideas. Under the semblance of stability, Japan was showing signs of irreparable cancer in its soul with each passing day, and we had to sit idly by. At the time when we most needed to act, the situation was not on our side. (Omitted)
Even if Japan sinks into the depths of decadence, you are the last young people of Japan who have learned the spirit of the samurai and been trained as samurai. When you abandon your ideals, Japan will perish. I have only thought of teaching you the pride of being a man. I hope that you have once joined the Tatenokai, you will never forget for the rest of your lives what the words "a True Japanese Man" (日本男児, Nippon Danji) mean. What you gain in your youth is your lifelong treasure. You must never abandon it.

— Yukio Mishima, To you all, who had been members of the Tatenokai on November 1945

== Interpretations ==
There are many different views about Mishima's death, including that it was an aesthetic suicide for the artist's sake, or that he was politically serious, and while many knowledgeable persons are eager to share their opinions about the mystery of his death, some of his fellow literary figures and left-wing intellectuals at the time remained silent and said nothing, or even chose to ignore the incident, feeling guilty for not taking any action themselves.

== Testimony from the person who had the final dialogue with Mishima ==
In the one hour-long interview dialogue with Takashi Furubayashi (古林尚), held at Mishima's residence in Minami Magome (南馬込), Ōta-ku, on the evening of November 18, one week before his suicide, Mishima had repeated two or three times, "You'll see," when the topic turned to the Tatenokai, and when Furubayashi had asked him about his future plans after The Sea of Fertility tetralogy, he had said, "At the moment, I have no plans for next work."

Looking back on that day, Furubayashi has commented on the look on Mishima's face when he had said "I really have no plans" after the dialogue, saying, "I have never seen him look so lonely." and has that Mishima repeatedly had muttered in the dialogue, "I no longer have a single friend in the literary world." Furubayashi also has recalled that after the dialogue, Mishima had said, "I lied when I wrote in my essay that my sister's death was more of a shock than the defeat of Japan. The defeat was a huge shock. I didn't know what to do."

Also, in the dialogue with Furubayashi, Mishima said that "I think of myself as something like Petronius. And, this may sound a bit dramatic, but I think my generation will be the last generation to know true Japanese language. I doubt there will never be come anyone who has the words of the Japanese classics ingrained into them, from here on." It is said that the image of Petronius that Mishima had in his mind was come from Petronius in Henryk Sienkiewicz's historical fiction Quo Vadis.

== See also ==
- Icarus (イカロス) – A lyric poetry by Mishima that was included in his book Sun and Steel and describes the desire to ascend to heaven (blue sky), and approaching the "sun."
- Kondō Isami – In May 1968, Mishima participated in the 100th anniversary after death of memorial service for Kondō Isami, who was a close friend of Mishima's great-grandfather, Nagai Naoyuki.
- Mishima: A Life in Four Chapters - A film based on the Mishima Incident
- On Hagakure: The Samurai Ethic and Modern Japan (葉隠入門, Hagakure Nyūmon)
- Ōshio Heihachirō Rebellion (大塩平八郎の乱, Ōshio Heihachirō no ran)
- The Dragon Flute (蘭陵王, Ryanryo ou) – Mishima's last short story, depicting an episode from his simple life in the Self-Defense Force barracks, where he listened to a Tatenokai member playing the gagaku piece Prince of Lanling (蘭陵王) on a Dragon flute (龍笛, Ryūteki).
- Rintarō Hinuma (日沼倫太郎) – The person who had been encouraged Mishima to commit suicide.
- Seirankai (青嵐会) – A policy group inspired by the Mishima Incident. It was founded within the Liberal Democratic Party by Shintaro Ishihara, Ichiro Nakagawa and others in 1973.
- Shōwa Restoration
- The Birth of Tragedy
- Yalta-Potsdam system (YP体制, YP taisei) – Japan's New Right defined the Postwar democracy (戦後民主主義, Sengo minshu-shugi) system as this, and U.S.-Japan relations as one of the victorious nations of World War II and their comprador governments, and criticized them.
- 11/25 The Day Mishima Chose His Own Fate - A film based on the Mishima Incident

== Sources ==
- Mishima, Yukio (2003). 決定版 三島由紀夫全集 第34巻 評論9 [Definitive Edition Yukio Mishima Complete Works No.34 – Criticisms 9] (in Japanese). Shinchosha. ISBN 978-4-10-642574-5.
- Mishima, Yukio (2003). 決定版 三島由紀夫全集 第36巻 評論11 [Definitive Edition Yukio Mishima Complete Works No.36 – Criticisms 11] (in Japanese). Shinchosha. ISBN 978-4-10-642576-9.
- Mishima, Yukio (2004). 決定版 三島由紀夫全集 第37巻 詩歌 [Definitive Edition Yukio Mishima Complete Works No.37 – Poetry] (in Japanese). Shinchosha. ISBN 978-4-10-642577-6.
- Mishima, Yukio (2004). 決定版 三島由紀夫全集 第38巻 書簡 [Definitive Edition Yukio Mishima Complete Works No.38 – Letters] (in Japanese). Shinchosha. ISBN 978-4-10-642578-3.
- Mishima, Yukio (2004). 決定版 三島由紀夫全集 第39巻 対談1 [Definitive Edition Yukio Mishima Complete Works No.39 – Dialogues 1] (in Japanese). Shinchosha. ISBN 978-4-10-642579-0.
- Mishima, Yukio (2004). 決定版 三島由紀夫全集 第40巻 対談2 [Definitive Edition Yukio Mishima Complete Works No.40 – Dialogues 2] (in Japanese). Shinchosha. ISBN 978-4-10-642580-6.
- Satō, Hideaki; Inoue, Takashi; Yamanaka, Takeshi, eds. (2005). 決定版 三島由紀夫全集 第42巻 年譜・書誌 [Definitive Edition Yukio Mishima Complete Works No.42 – Biographical Sketch and Bibliography] (in Japanese). Shinchosha. ISBN 978-4-10-642582-0.
- Agata, Mitsunori; others (2025). 殉国の行動者 三島由紀夫 [Martyr to the Country: Yukio Mishima] (in Japanese). Asia Shimbunsha. ISBN 978-4-9911961-3-3.
- Akiyama, Shun; others (1990). 三島由紀夫 [Yukio Mishima]. Gunzo – Japanese Authors 18 (in Japanese). Shogakukan. ISBN 978-4-09-567018-8.
- Andō, Takeshi (1996). 三島由紀夫「日録」 ["Daily Record" of Yukio Mishima] (in Japanese). Michitani. ISBN 978-4-915841-39-2.
- Andō, Takeshi (1998). 三島由紀夫の生涯 [The Life of Yukio Mishima] (in Japanese). Natsume Shobo. ISBN 978-4-931391-39-0.
- Chujō, Shōhei, ed. (2005). 三島由紀夫が死んだ日―あの日、何が終り何が始まったのか [The Day Yukio Mishima Died: What Ended and What Began on That Day] (in Japanese). Jitsugyo no Nihon Sha. ISBN 978-4-408-53472-5.
- Chujō, Shōhei, ed. (2005). 続・三島由紀夫が死んだ日―あの日は、どうしていまも生々しいのか [Sequel - The Day Yukio Mishima Died: Why is That Day Still So Vivid to Us] (in Japanese). Jitsugyo no Nihon Sha. ISBN 978-4-408-53482-4.
- Date, Munekatsu (1972). 裁判記録「三島由紀夫事件」 [Judicial Record of the "Mishima Incident"] (in Japanese). Kodansha. NCID BN0140450X.
- Fukushima, Jurō (2005) [1st pub. Shinjinbutu Ōraisha:1975]. 再訂資料・三島由紀夫 [Re-Edition Document - Yukio Mishima] (in Japanese) (Enlarged ed.). Chobunsha. ISBN 978-4-88695-180-9.
- Hamasaki, Yōsuke (2020). 三島由紀夫―なぜ、死んでみせねばならなかったのか [Yukio Mishima: Why did He have to Show His Dying]. The Essence of Postwar Thought (in Japanese). NHK Publishing, Inc. ISBN 978-4-14-081832-9.
- Hara, Ryūichi (2004). 熱海の青年将校―三島由紀夫と私 [A Young Officer in Atami: Yukio Mishima and Me] (in Japanese). Singpoosha. ISBN 978-4-7974-4324-0.
- Hasegawa, Izumi; Takeda, Katsuhiko, eds. (1976). 三島由紀夫事典 [Encyclopedia of Yukio Mishima] (in Japanese). Meiji Shoin. ISBN 978-4-625-40025-4. NCID BN01686605.
- Hijiya-Kirschnereit, Irmela, ed. (2010). MISHIMA!―三島由紀夫の知的ルーツと国際的インパクト [MISHIMA!: The Intellectual Roots of Yukio Mishima and the International Impact] (in Japanese). Shōwado. ISBN 978-4-8122-1064-2.
- Hiraoka, Azusa (1996) [1st pub. 1972]. 伜・三島由紀夫 [My Son – Yukio Mishima]. Bunshu Bunko (in Japanese) (Paperback ed.). Bungeishunjū. ISBN 978-4-16-716204-7.
- Hiraoka, Azusa (1974). 伜・三島由紀夫（没後） [My Son – Yukio Mishima (After death)] (in Japanese). Bungeishunjū. NCID BN03950861.
- Hori, Yukio (1993) [1st pub. 1983]. 戦後の右翼勢力 [Right-wing Forces of Postwar] (in Japanese) (Enlarged ed.). Keiso Shobo. ISBN 978-4-326-35040-7.
- Hosaka, Masayasu (2001) [1st pub. Kodansha:1980]. 三島由紀夫と楯の会事件 [Yukio Mishima and the Tatenokai Incident]. Kadokawa Bunko (in Japanese) (Enlarged/Revised ed.). Kadokawa Shoten. ISBN 978-4-04-355602-1.
- Inose, Naoki (1999) [1st pub. 1995]. ペルソナ―三島由紀夫伝 [Persona: A Biography of Yukio Mishima]. Bunshun Bunko (in Japanese) (Paperback ed.). Bungeishunjū. ISBN 978-4-16-743109-9.
- Inose, Naoki; Satō, Hiroaki (2012). Persona: A Biography of Yukio Mishima. Berkeley, California: Stone Bridge Press. ISBN 978-1-61172-008-2.
- Inuzuka, Kiyoshi (2020). 三島由紀夫と死んだ男―森田必勝の生涯 [The Man who Died with Yukio Mishima: The Life of Masakatsu Morita] (in Japanese). Shumei University Shuppan-kai. ISBN 978-4-915855-40-5.
- Ishihara, Shintaro (1999). 国家なる幻影―わが政治への反回想 [The Illusion of the Nation: Anti-Reminiscence on My Politics] (in Japanese). Bungeishunjū. ISBN 978-4-16-354730-5.
- Itasaka, Gō; Suzuki, Kunio (2010). 三島由紀夫と一九七〇年 [Yukio Mishima and 1970] (in Japanese). Rokusaisha. ISBN 978-4-8463-0772-1.
- Itō, Katsuhiko (2002). 三島由紀夫の沈黙―その死と江藤淳・石原慎太郎 [The Silence of Yukio Mishima: His Death and Jun Etō, Shintaro Ishihara] (in Japanese). Tōshindo. ISBN 978-4-88713-448-5.
- Kawabata, Yasunari (1982). 川端康成全集 第29巻 評論1 [Yasunari Kawabata Complete Works No.29 - Criticisms 1] (in Japanese). Shinchosha. ISBN 978-4-10-643829-5.
- Kawashima, Masaru (1996). 三島由紀夫 [Yukio Mishima] (in Japanese). Bungeishunjū. ISBN 978-4-16-351280-8.
- Keene, Donald (2019) [1st pub. 2005]. 思い出の作家たち―谷崎・川端・三島・安部・司馬 [Memorable Authors: Tanizaki, Kawabata, Mishima, Abe, and Shiba]. Shincho Bunko (in Japanese) (Paperback ed.). Shinchosha. ISBN 978-4-10-131355-9.
- Kitakage, Yukō (2006). 三島由紀夫と葉隠武士道 [Yukio Mishima and Hagakure Bushido] (in Japanese). Hakua Shobo. ISBN 978-4-89172-683-6.
- Kojima, Chikako (1996) [1st pub. Kōsōsha:1980]. 三島由紀夫と檀一雄 [Yukio Mishima and Kazuo Dan]. Chikuma Bunko (in Japanese) (Paperback ed.). Chikuma Shobō. ISBN 978-4-480-03182-2.
- Komuro, Naoki (1985). 三島由紀夫が復活する [Yukio Mishima will be Resurrected] (in Japanese). Mainichi Communications. NCID BN10913162.
- Matsumoto, Tōru (1990). 三島由紀夫 年表作家読本 [Yukio Mishima: Author's Chronological Reader] (in Japanese). Kawade Shobō Shinsha. ISBN 978-4-309-70052-6.
- Matsumoto, Tōru; Satō, Hideaki; Inoue, Takashi, eds. (2000). 三島由紀夫事典 [Encyclopedia of Yukio Mishima] (in Japanese). Bensei Shuppan. ISBN 978-4-585-06018-5.
- Matsuura, Yoshiko; Matsuura, Hiroshi (supervisor) (2020) [1st pub. 2010]. 自決より五十年 三島由紀夫と「楯の会」―「後をたのむ」と託された思い [50 Years after Their Suicide: Yukio Mishima and the Tatenokai – The Feeling of being entrusted with "I'll leave it to you after."] (in Japanese) (Enlarged ed.). Takagi Shobo. ISBN 978-4-88471-819-0.
- Mizuki, Shigeru (1994) [1st pub. 1989]. コミック昭和史 第8巻 [Showa: A History of Japan Vol. 8]. Kodansha Bunko (in Japanese) (Paperback ed.). Kodansha. ISBN 978-4-06-185827-5.
- Mochimaru, Hiroshi; Satō, Matsuo (2010). 証言 三島由紀夫・福田恆存 たった一度の対決 [Testimonies: The Only Once Confrontation between Yukio Mishima and Tsuneari Fukuda] (in Japanese). Bungeishunjū. ISBN 978-4-16-373250-3.
- Morita, Masakatsu (2002) [1st pub. 1971]. わが思想と行動―遺稿集 [My Thoughts and Actions: His Posthumous Manuscripts] (in Japanese) (New Format ed.). Nisshin Hōdō. ISBN 978-4-8174-0528-9.
- Murakami, Takeo (2010). 君たちには分からない―「楯の會」で見た三島由紀夫 [You Guys don't Understand: Yukio Mishima that I Saw in "Tatenokai"] (in Japanese). Shinchosha. ISBN 978-4-10-327851-1.
- Muramatsu, Takeshi (1990). 三島由紀夫の世界 [The World of Yukio Mishima] (in Japanese). Shinchosha. ISBN 978-4-10-321402-1.
- Muramatsu, Eiko (2007). 三島由紀夫 追想のうた―女優として育てられて [Yukio Mishima - A Song of Remembrance: Raised as an Actress by Him] (in Japanese). Hankyu Communications. ISBN 978-4-484-07205-0.
- Murata, Haruki (2015). 三島由紀夫が生きた時代―楯の会と森田必勝 [The Period when Yukio Mishima was Alive: The Tatenokai and Masakatsu Morita] (in Japanese). Seirindo. ISBN 978-4-7926-0532-2.
- Nagano, Yūji (2019). 小説 三島由紀夫 [Novel: Yukio Mishima] (in Japanese). Gentosha. ISBN 978-4-344-92529-8. Although the title has the word "novel," not a novel, but a biography.
- Nakagawa, Yusuke (2010). 昭和45年11月25日―三島由紀夫自決、日本が受けた衝撃 [November 25, 1970: Yukio Mishima's Suicide, the Impact on Japan]. Gentosha Shinsho 184 (in Japanese). Gentosha. ISBN 978-4-344-98185-0.
- Nakamura, Akihiko (2015) [1st pub. Bungeishunjū:2000]. 三島事件 もう一人の主役―烈士と呼ばれた森田必勝 [Another Protagonist of the Mishima Incident: Masakatsu Morita who Called an Upright Man] (in Japanese) (Enlarged ed.). WAC inc. ISBN 978-4-89831-729-7.
- Nathan, John (1975) [1st pub. Little, Brown and Company:1974]. Mishima: A Biography. Tut books. North Clarendon, Vermont: Tuttle Publishing. ISBN 978-4805304020.
  - Nathan, John (2000). Mishima: A Biography (New ed.). Boston, Massachusetts: Da Capo Press. ISBN 978-0-306-80977-4.
- Nathan, John (2000) [1st pub. 1976 (an out-of-print book)]. 新版 三島由紀夫─ある評伝 [New Edition – Mishima: A Biography] (in Japanese). Translated by Noguchi, Takehiko (New/Revised ed.). Shinchosha. ISBN 978-4-10-505702-2.
- Nihon Gakusei Shimbun, ed. (1971). 回想の三島由紀夫 [Yukio Mishima in Reminiscence] (in Japanese). Gyōsei Tsūshinsha. NCID BN0927582X.
- Nihon Keizai Shimbun, ed. (2007). 私の履歴書―保守政権の担い手 [My Resume: Leaders in the Conservative Government] (in Japanese). Nikkei Business Publications. ISBN 978-4-532-19373-7.
- Nishi, Hōtaro (2017). 死の貌―三島由紀夫の真実 [The Appearance of Death: The Truth about Yukio Mishima] (in Japanese). Ronsōsha. ISBN 978-4-8460-1669-2.
- Nishi, Hōtaro (2020). 三島由紀夫事件 50年目の証言―警察と自衛隊は何を知っていたか [Yukio Mishima Incident - Testimonies of 50 Years Later: What did the Police and the Self-Defense Forces Know] (in Japanese). Shinchosha. ISBN 978-4-10-353581-2.
- Onishi, Keiko, ed. (2025). 三島由紀夫 神になった男―第一部 「純白」の楯の会 [Yukio Mishima, The Man who Became God: Part 1 - The "Pure White" Tatenokai] (in Japanese). Parade. ISBN 978-4-86522-455-9.
- Okamura, Ao (2020) [1st pub. Gendai Shokan:1990]. 三島由紀夫と森田必勝―楯の会事件 若き行動者の軌跡 [Yukio Mishima and Masakatsu Morita: The Tatenokai Incident, the Trajectory of a Young Activist]. Kōjinsha NF Bunko (in Japanese) (Paperback ed.). Ushio Shobo Kōjin Shinsha. ISBN 978-4-7698-3191-4.
- Okayama, Norihiro (2014). 三島由紀夫外伝 [The Side Story of Yukio Mishima] (in Japanese). Sairyusha. ISBN 978-4-7791-7022-5.
- Okayama, Norihiro (2016). 三島由紀夫が愛した美女たち [The Beauties Yukio Mishima Loved] (in Japanese). Keibunsha. ISBN 978-4-89992-020-5.
- Okuno, Takeo (2000) [1st pub. 1993]. 三島由紀夫伝説 [Legend of Yukio Mishima]. Shincho Bunko (in Japanese) (Revised/Paperback ed.). Shinchosha. ISBN 978-4-10-135602-0.
- Sakurai, Hidenori (2020). 三島由紀夫は何を遺したか [What did Yukio Mishima Leave Behind] (in Japanese). Kizuna Shuppan. ISBN 978-4-86663-128-8.
- Satō, Eisaku (1997). 佐藤栄作日記 第4巻 [Sato Eisaku Diary Vol.4] (in Japanese). The Asahi Shimbun Company. ISBN 978-4-02-257144-1.
- Scott-Stokes, Henry (1975) [1st pub. Ballantine Books:1974]. The Life and Death of Yukio Mishima. Tut books. North Clarendon, Vermont: Tuttle Publishing. ISBN 978-4805303917.
  - Scott-Stokes, Henry (2000). The Life and Death of Yukio Mishima (Enlarged/Revised ed.). New York City: Cooper Square Press. ISBN 978-0-8154-1074-4.
- Scott-Stokes, Henry (1985). 三島由紀夫─死と真実 [The Life and Death of Yukio Mishima] (in Japanese). Translated by Tokuoka, Takao. Diamond, Inc. ISBN 978-4-478-94056-3.
  - Scott-Stokes, Henry (1998). 三島由紀夫─生と死 [The Life and Death of Yukio Mishima] (in Japanese). Translated by Tokuoka, Takao (Enlarged/Revised ed.). Seiryu Publ. ISBN 978-4-916028-52-5.
- Seikai, Ken (2000). 三島由紀夫の帰還―青海健評論集 [The Return of Yukio Mishima: Ken Seikai's Criticism Collection] (in Japanese). Ozawa Shoten. ISBN 978-4-7551-0393-3.
- Shibasaki, Shinzō (2025). 三島由紀夫という迷宮―〈英雄〉を夢みた人 [The Labyrinth, that called Yukio Mishima: A Man Who Dreamed of Being a Hero] (in Japanese). Soshisha. ISBN 978-4-7942-2797-3.
- Shibata, Shōji (2012). 三島由紀夫 作品に隠された自決への道 [Yukio Mishima: The Path to Suicide Hidden in His Works] (in Japanese). Shodensha. ISBN 978-4-396-11300-1.
- Shigyō, Sōshū (2025). 永遠の三島由紀夫 [The Eternal Yukio Mishima] (in Japanese). Jitsugyo no Nihon Sha. ISBN 978-4-408-65121-7.
- Shimauchi, Keiji (2010). 三島由紀夫―豊饒の海へ注ぐ [Yukio Mishima: Flows into The Sea of Fertility]. Minerva Japan Biography Selection (in Japanese). Minerva Shobo. ISBN 978-4-623-05912-6.
- Suizu, Kenji (1971). 三島由紀夫の悲劇―病跡学的考察 [The Tragedy of Yukio Mishima: A Pathographic Study] (in Japanese). Toshi Shuppansha. NCID BN04848339.
- Suzuki, Ayumi; Tamura, Tsukasa (supervisor) (2005). 火群のゆくへ―元楯の会会員たちの心の軌跡 [Whereabouts of the Flames: The Trajectories of Their Hearts who once Belonged to the Tatenokai] (in Japanese). Hakurosha. ISBN 978-4-434-07066-2.
- Takemoto, Tadao (1998) [1st pub. 1981]. パリ憂国忌―三島由紀夫VSヨーロッパ [Paris Yūkoku-ki: Yukio Mishima VS Europe] (in Japanese) (3rd ed.). Nippon Kyobunsha. ISBN 978-4-531-06116-7.
- Tokuoka, Takao (1999) [1st pub. 1996]. 五衰の人―三島由紀夫私記 [The Man of the Decay of the Angel: Private Notes about Yukio Mishima] (in Japanese) (Paperback ed.). Bungeishunjū. ISBN 978-4-16-744903-2.
- Yamamoto, Kiyokatsu (2001). 自衛隊「影の部隊」―三島由紀夫を殺した真実の告白 [Japan Self-Defense Forces "A Unit of Shadow": Confession of a Truth that Killed Yukio Mishima] (in Japanese). Kodansha. ISBN 978-4-06-210781-5.
- Yamamoto, Mitsunobu (2017). 私の中の三島由紀夫 [Yukio Mishima in Me] (in Japanese). Hakurosha. ISBN 978-4-434-23098-1.
- Yamadaira, Shigeki (2004). 最後の浪人 阿部勉伝―酒抱きてけふも堕ちなん [A Biography of The Last Rōnin, Tsutomu Abe: With a Sake Bottle in His Arms, He will Fall Again Today] (in Japanese). J's Keibunsha. ISBN 978-4-905848-50-9.
- Yoshida, Kazuaki (1985). 三島由紀夫 [Yukio Mishima]. For Beginners Series 35 (in Japanese). Illustrated by Akira Wakaki. Gendai Shokan. ISBN 978-4-7684-0035-7.
- Yukio Mishima Study Group, ed. (2010). 「憂国忌」の四十年―三島由紀夫氏追悼の記録と証言 [Forty Years of "Yūkoku-ki": Records and Testimonies in Memory of Mr. Yukio Mishima] (in Japanese). Namiki Shobo. ISBN 978-4-89063-262-6.
- Yukio Mishima Study Group, ed. (2020). 「憂国忌」の五十年 [Fifty Years of "Yūkoku-ki"] (in Japanese). Keibunsha Shobo. ISBN 978-4-89992-071-7.
- Yukio Mishima Study Group, ed. (2024). 三島由紀夫 憂国と情念 [Yukio Mishima: His Patriotism and Passion] (in Japanese). Namiki Shobo. ISBN 978-4-89063-455-2.
- Kawade Shobō Shinsha, ed. (1990). 新文芸読本 三島由紀夫 [New Literary Reader: Yukio Mishima] (in Japanese). Kawade Shobō Shinsha. ISBN 978-4-309-70155-4.
- Kawade Shobō Shinsha, ed. (2020). 文藝別冊 三島由紀夫1970―海を二つに割るように、彼は逝った [Bungei Separate Volume – Yukio Mishima 1970: He Passed Away like Splitting the Sea in Two]. KAWADE Dream Mook (in Japanese). Kawade Shobō Shinsha. ISBN 978-4-309-98005-8.
- Sankei Shimbun Co., Ltd., ed. (2010). 正論 2010年10月号 [The Seiron – October 2010 Issue] (in Japanese). Sankei Shimbun Co., Ltd. ASIN B003Z3CI2W.
