= 11/25 The Day Mishima Chose His Own Fate =

2012 film by Kōji Wakamatsu

- DVD cover
- Directed by: Kōji Wakamatsu
- Written by: Masayuki Kakegawa
- Produced by: Noriko Ozaki; Kōji Wakamatsu
- Starring: Arata Iura
- Cinematography: Yūsaku Mitsuwaka; Tomohiko Tsuji
- Release dates: 25 May 2012 (Cannes); 2 June 2012 (Japan)
- Running time: 119 minutes
- Country: Japan
- Language: Japanese

11/25 The Day Mishima Chose His Own Fate (Japanese: 11・25自決の日 三島由紀夫と若者たち, Hepburn: 11.25 Jiketsu no Hi: Mishima Yukio to Wakamonotachi), also called 11.25 The Day He Chose His Own Fate, is a 2012 Japanese drama film directed by Kōji Wakamatsu. The film was based on the Mishima Incident, which was a failed coup d'etat attempt led by Yukio Mishima in 1970. The film competed in the Un Certain Regard section at the 2012 Cannes Film Festival.

== Plot ==
Yukio Mishima had become one of Japan's leading authors, as a Nobel Prize in Literature candidate, on the back of numerous works including Confessions of a Mask, The Sound of Waves, The Temple of the Golden Pavilion, Patriotism, and Madame de Sade.

Meanwhile, after undergoing training with the Japan Ground Self-Defense Force (JGSDF), he officially established the Tatenokai, a civilian militia, alongside nationalist students in 1968, when the height of the left-wing student's movement "Anpo protests".

His intention was to risk his life alongside the JSDF in the event of an emergency – such as riots staged by new-left students Zenkyōtō under the banner of opposing the US-Japan Security Treaty (Anpo) – using the deployment for domestic peace-keeping as the ultimate opportunity to transform the JSDF into Japan's true national military.

However, even when new-left riots broke out, the Tokyo Metropolitan Police Department's Riot Police Unit managed to suppress them without requiring intervention from the JSDF or the Tatenokai, leaving Mishma and his members, including Masakatsu Morita, consumed by a growing sense of frustration.

Mishima continually pondered the true nature of postwar Japan and the pivotal events he had observed, including the February 26 Incident, the Assassination of Inejirō Asanuma, and the student movements exemplified by the Yasuda Auditorium Incident (東大安田講堂事件). Finally, on November 25, 1970, aiming to awaken the JSDF, Mishima headed to the JGSDF Camp Ichigaya (市ヶ谷駐屯地), accompanied by four members of the Tatenokai.

Mishima began calling on the JSDF personnel to rise up in action for abolish Article 9 of the Japanese Constitution. After his speech met with a barrage of jeer, he committed seppuku, ritual suicide in accordance with the ancient samurai custom, and Morita followed suit. By assembling fragmentary scenes of the background leading up to the incident, this film dramatically portrays the moment of their final resolve.

== Cast ==
This is the film cast.

- Arata Iura as Yukio Mishima (the head of Tatenokai)
- Shinnosuke Mitsushima as Masakatsu Morita (the Tatenokai member who participated in the incident, the second student leader of Tatenokai)
- Takatsugu Iwama (岩間天嗣) as Hiroyasu Koga (the Tatenokai member who participated in the incident)
- Tasuku Nagaoka (永岡佑) as Masayoshi Koga (小賀正義) (ditto)
- Suzunosuke (鈴之助) as Masahiro Ogawa (小川正洋) (ditto)
- Soran Tamoto (田本清嵐) as Otoya Yamaguchi (the boy who killed Inejiro Asanuma)
- Shinobu Terajima as Yōko Hiraoka (平岡瑤子) (Mishima's wife)
- Kiyohiko Shibukawa as Hiroshi Mochimaru (持丸博) (the first student leader of Tatenokai)
- Hideo Nakaizumi (中泉英雄) as Kenichi Tanaka (田中健一) (a Tatenokai member, Morita's close friend)
- Yuki Hirano (平野勇樹) as Tomoaki Turumi (鶴見友昭) (ditto)
- Shima Onishi (大西信満) as Kiyoshi Kuramochi (倉持清) (a Tatenokai member)
- Tomosuke Kasamatsu (笠松伴助) as Kazuhiko Nakatsuji (中辻和彦) (ditto)
- Shinji Suzuki (鈴木信二) as Makatsu Sekikawa (関河真克) (a Tatenokai member and Dragon flute (龍笛, Ryūteki) player, he performed Prince of Lanling (蘭陵王))
- Ichiro Hashimoto (橋本一郎) as Hidetoshi Saitō (斉藤英俊) (a "Japan Students' League" (日本学生同盟, Nihon Gakusei Dōmei) member, Waseda University student)
- Motoki Ochiai as Hideaki Endo (遠藤秀明) (a Waseda University student, Morita's friend, he engaged in Kuril Islands dispute with Morita)
- Yuto Kobayashi (小林優斗) as Shigeru Ueda (上田茂) (Morita's childhood friend)
- Hanae Kan as Makiko (牧子) (Morita's childhood first love, Shigeru's older sister)
- Katsuyuki Shinohara (篠原勝之) as Junzō Ikarii (碇井準三), (a former Lieutenant General, the principal of the JGSDF Fuji school (陸上自衛隊富士学校))
- Gô Jibiki as Takashi Fukuoka (福岡喬) (an instructor of the Fuji school)
- Ryushi Mizukami (水上竜士) as Kiyokatsu Yamamoto (山本舜勝) (the head of the Information Education Section at the JGSDF Intelligence School (JGSDF Kodaira School) (陸上自衛隊調査学校))
- Ken Yoshizawa as Kanetoshi Mashita (益田兼利) (the JSDF Eastern Army Headquarters Commander-in-Chief, Lieutenant General)
- Toshiki Masuda as a JSDF staff officer
- Sanshiro Kobayashi (小林三四郎) as Hiroshi Funasaka (舩坂弘) (a former Imperial Japanese Army Sergeant, he presented to Mishima, a Katana (Japanese sword) Seki Magoroku (関孫六), the celebrated sword that Magoroku (孫六) made)
- Ichirō Ogura (小倉一郎) as Kenichi Tanaka's father
- Kimihiko Hasegawa (長谷川公彦) as Takao Tokuoka (徳岡孝夫) (the reporter entrusted by Mishima with his Geki)
