= Geki =

Geki is Japanese for "Strike" or "Fierce" and may refer to:

- A male shaman
- Geki (driver) (1937–1967), pseudonym of Giacomo Russo, an Italian race car driver
- Geki (Mishima), a last manifesto by Yukio Mishima in 1970
- Juken Sentai Gekiranger, a Japanese television program
- Geki, a fictional ninja in Street Fighter arcade games
- Geki/Tyranno Ranger, a fictional character in Kyōryū Sentai Zyuranger tokusatsu television series
- Bear Geki, a character in Saint Seiya
