= Geki (manifesto) =

Final 1971 manifesto by Yukio Mishima

- Author: Yukio Mishima
- Original title: 檄
- Language: Japanese
- Genre: Manifesto, Speech
- Publisher: Japanese newspapers
- Publication date: November 25, 1970
- Publication place: Japan
- English publication date: 1971

Geki (檄, Geki) is a last manifesto by the Japanese author Yukio Mishima. It was his written appeal, which many copies were scattered before Mishima gave a speech from the balcony after occupied the Eastern Army Commander's office at the Japan Ground Self-Defense Force Camp Ichigaya on November 25, 1970 (the Mishima Incident). (Note: These copies were scattered by the Tatenokai members, Masakatsu Morita and Masahiro Ogawa (小川正洋).) The gist of the manifesto is almost the same as that of the balcony speech.

Geki is a 10-paragraph piece of text, converting it into about nine pages long in manuscript paper, densely written in Mishima's own handwriting across two sheets of B4 paper. The signature reads "Captain of the Tatenokai, Yukio Mishima."

After the Mishima Incident, the entire text of Geki was published in the evening editions or next day's morning editions of almost Japanese newspapers, except for the Asahi Shimbun, which was cut out some parts of it. The first magazine that published the entire text immediately after the incident was the weekly magazine Sunday Mainichi (サンデー毎日). The manifesto has often been quoted in various books and research papers on Mishima, and biographies of him, after his death.

Geki was translated into English by Harris I. Martin as An appeal, and published in Solidarity (August 1971 issue) and Japan Interpreter (Vol.7, No.1, 1971 issue).

== Contents ==
Geki is considered to be the conclusion of Mishima's life as a warrior (武人, bujin), and if his posthumous novel The Sea of Fertility is the culmination of his aesthetics as a literary figure, then with "Geki" subsumes those essences, and also the aggregation of Mishima's mental structure as a warrior who aspired to be both literary and martial.

It is also a document that can be considered the aggregation or essence of Mishima's criticism of postwar Japan, the evaluation of the contents has elements that determined by the annual rings of Japanese long history. The entire text is almost used the pronoun "we," and it has expressed a feeling of hopelessness and pessimistic anger to the fate of the Japan Self-Defense Forces, just are keeping without utilizing their skills and talents, in the forlorn reality that Article 9 of the Constitution cannot be amended.

In Geki, Mishima looked back on his approximately four years of trial enlistment in the JSDF, and explained why he and his Tatenokai comrades committed action what for JSDF might be considered an "ungrateful action", because of "our love for the JSDF". He then stated that they had been dreamed about JSDF of preserving "the real Japanese, the true spirit of the samurai," but JSDF was legally "unconstitutional" under the now constitution imposed on them by the GHQ after the war, and had been continued to bear "the dishonorable cross of the nation after defeat," and that JSDF only given a status like that of a huge police force, and the "object of its loyalty has not been made clear." And he reached out that "Defense, that should be a fundamental issue for the nation, has been obscured by convenient legal interpretations, and as an army which does not use the name of a national army, which has been the fundamental cause of the corruption of the Japanese soul and the decadence of morals."

We watched postwar Japan become obsessed with economic prosperity, forget the country's roots, lose its national spirit, pursue ends without correcting the roots, fall into makeshift measures and hypocrisy, and fall into an emptiness of the spirit. Politics became devoted to covering up contradictions, self-preservation, lust for power, and hypocrisy, the nation's long-term plans were left to foreign country, the shame of defeat was not wiped away but merely whitewashed, and the Japanese themselves desecrated Japan's history and traditions. We had to watch with gritting teeth as the Japanese themselves desecrated Japan's history and traditions.

— Captain of the Tatenokai, Yukio Mishima, Geki

He said that "the original purpose of the establishment of Japan's military is exist to 'protecting Japan's history, culture, and traditions centered on the Emperor'." And he argued that it was difficult to revise the constitution under the current system, but if the government had requested the JSDF to be deployed for Public Security Operation (治安出動, Chian shutsudō) to suppress the New Left demonstrations on October 21, 1969, which was only perfect opportunity to revise the constitution. He also criticized the government that had suppressing the demonstrators with police force alone, by which gained confidence that it could maintain the political system without "picking up the hot chestnuts out of the fire named 'constitutional amendment'".

He then criticized that the Liberal Democratic Party, which had been "continued to turn a blind eye to the country's fundamental issues", felt relieved along with the Communist Party, and since that day, LDP had permanently excluded constitutional amendment from its political program, and that Japan would continue to be a country that protects the constitution in the future, and that the JSDF, which are supposed to protect the nation, had been deceived by politicians and would forever be trapped in the humiliating paradox of being a "constitutional protection army" that denies itself.

Furthermore, Mishima lamented the fact that the JSDF personnel have remained silent and are just like "canaries whose voices have been taken away," reaching out, "Sadly, in the end, the missions that are given to you will not come from Japan," he also mentioned the "Treaty on the Non-Proliferation of Nuclear Weapons" that unequal treaty disadvantageous to Japan and affecting the nation's long-term plans, and he lamented the fact that not a single general had committed seppuku in protest against it, and, in the end, he touched on the inside of the Reversion of Okinawa.

What is the Reversion of Okinawa? What is the responsibility of the mainland for defending? It is patently obvious that the U.S. would not be glad to see a truly independent Japanese military defending Japanese land. If Japan does not regain its independence within the next two years, the JSDF will end up as American mercenaries forever as the leftists say. (Omitted)
Is that all right a world in which the soul is dead and just for only respect life? What meaning of the army without values higher than life? Now is the time to we will show you where to find an existence of greater value more than respect for life. It is not liberalism or democracy. It is Japan! It is Japan, the land of the history and the tradition we love, Japan. Are none of you willing to die by hurling yourselves against the constitution that has torn the bones and heart from that which we love?

— Captain of the Tatenokai, Yukio Mishima, Geki

The words "within the next two years" he said, has understood as a signal of the "US-China Reconciliation" and the "Okinawa Reversion" in 1972, and it has considered that Mishima was concerned about the form in which Okinawa would be returned, and predicted a permanent American occupation that would continue indefinitely.

== Letters entrusted to two journalists ==
In the each letters entrusting the original papers of this Geki to the weekly magazine Sunday Mainichi reporter Takao Tokuoka (徳岡孝夫) and NHK reporter Munekatsu Date (伊達宗克), via Kenichi Tanaka (田中健一) and Kenji Kurata (倉田賢司), respectively, of the Tatenokai members who were close friends of Masakatsu Morita. In the letters Mishima wrote as follows, strongly expressed his desire for the entire text of Geki to be made public.

In any event, the incident is an only minor one. Please keep in mind that this is merely an individual play of our own. The enclosed Geki and photographs of my comrades are being given to you out of fear that they will be confiscated by the police, so please keep them well concealed and publish them freely. I would please, please, like to you publish the Geki uncut.
We expect the incident to take two hours. But during that time anything could happen to foil us. To others this will seem to lunacy; but I hope you will understand that as far as we are concerned, we act purely out of patriotic ardor.

— Yukio Mishima, Letters to Takao Tokuoka and Munekatsu Date

== Evaluation ==
In 1997, when a magazine article mentioned a plan to create a "Declaration of Independence of Japan," Takeshi Kitano has cited a paragraph from Mishima's "Geki" that begins, "We have watched postwar Japan become obsessed with economic prosperity, forget the country's roots, lose its national spirit, pursue ends without correcting the roots, fall into makeshift measures and hypocrisy, and sink into an emptiness of the spirit. Politics became devoted to covering up contradictions, self-preservation, lust for power, and hypocrisy,..." And Kitano has praised the manifesto, saying, "This is exactly what Japan is like now. I thought I should start by placing these sentences at the beginning of a declaration of independence for Japan."

== Voice recordings of his final speech related to the Geki ==
In December 1970 after the Mishima's death, Pony Canyon released the EP record and LP record containing recordings of Mishima's voice of final speech, and Asahi Sonorama and Weekly Sankei (Fujisankei Communications Group) released the Flexi disc, and Apollon (Bandai Music Entertainment) released the cassette tape.

All of these recordings were based on audio recorded by journalists from Nippon Cultural Broadcasting and Fuji Television who were at the scene of the incident. Only the Nippon Cultural Broadcasting recording is available for the opening part of the speech, but the Fuji Television recording gives a clearer sound to the latter half of the speech.

The Apollon cassette tape and the Weekly Sankei flexi disc contain not only Mishima's voice, but also the voice of Masakatsu Morita saying, "Everyone, please listen."

== See also ==
- Postwar Regime (戦後レジーム, Sengo rejiimu)
- Shinpūren rebellion
- Treaty of Mutual Cooperation and Security between the United States and Japan
- Unity of knowledge and action – a proposition of Yangmingism that influenced Mishima.
- Wang Yangming Thought as Revolutionary Philosophy (革命哲学としての陽明学, Kakumei tetsugaku toshiteno Yomegaku) - Mishima's 1970 essay on Yangmingism

== Sources ==
- Mishima, Yukio (2003). 決定版 三島由紀夫全集 第36巻 評論11 [Definitive Edition Yukio Mishima Complete Works No.36 – Criticisms 11] (in Japanese). Shinchosha. ISBN 978-4-10-642576-9.
- Satō, Hideaki; Inoue, Takashi; Yamanaka, Takeshi, eds. (2005). 決定版 三島由紀夫全集 第42巻 年譜・書誌 [Definitive Edition Yukio Mishima Complete Works No.42 – Biographical Sketch and Bibliography] (in Japanese). Shinchosha. ISBN 978-4-10-642582-0.
- Mishima, Yukio (2024). 「国を守る」とは何か―三島由紀夫政治論集 [What Does it Mean to "Defend the Country": Yukio Mishima's Political Essays]. Kawade Bunko (in Japanese). Kawade Shobō Shinsha. ISBN 978-4-309-42155-1.
- Andō, Takeshi (1996). 三島由紀夫「日録」 ["Daily Record" of Yukio Mishima] (in Japanese). Michitani. ISBN 978-4-915841-39-2.
- Date, Munekatsu (1972). 裁判記録「三島由紀夫事件」 [Judicial Record of the "Mishima Incident"] (in Japanese). Kodansha. NCID BN0140450X.
- Fukushima, Jurō (2005) [1st pub. Shinjinbutu Ōraisha:1975]. 再訂資料・三島由紀夫 [Re-Edition Document - Yukio Mishima] (in Japanese) (Enlarged ed.). Chobunsha. ISBN 978-4-88695-180-9.
- Hasegawa, Izumi; Takeda, Katsuhiko, eds. (1976). 三島由紀夫事典 [Encyclopedia of Yukio Mishima] (in Japanese). Meiji Shoin. ISBN 978-4-625-40025-4. NCID BN01686605.
- Hosaka, Masayasu (2001) [1st pub. Kodansha:1980]. 三島由紀夫と楯の会事件 [Yukio Mishima and the Tatenokai Incident]. Kadokawa Bunko (in Japanese) (Enlarged/Revised ed.). Kadokawa Shoten. ISBN 978-4-04-355602-1.
- Inoue, Toyoo (2006). 果し得ていない約束―三島由紀夫が遺せしもの [Promise that He hasn't been Fulfilled: What Yukio Mishima Left Behind] (in Japanese). Cosmo no Hon. ISBN 978-4-906380-80-0.
- Inuzuka, Kiyoshi (2020). 三島由紀夫と死んだ男―森田必勝の生涯 [The Man who Died with Yukio Mishima: The Life of Masakatsu Morita] (in Japanese). Shumei University Shuppan-kai. ISBN 978-4-915855-40-5.
- Itasaka, Gō (2017). 三島由紀夫は、なぜ昭和天皇を殺さなかったのか [Why Yukio Mishima didn't Kill Emperor Shōwa] (in Japanese). Rokusaisha. ISBN 978-4-8463-1213-8.
- Kan, Takayuki (2018). 三島由紀夫と天皇 [Yukio Mishima and the Emperor]. Heibonsha Shinsho 896 (in Japanese). Heibonsha. ISBN 978-4-582-85896-9.
- Matsumoto, Ken'ichi (2007) [1st pub. Kawade Shobō Shinsha:1987]. 三島由紀夫亡命伝説 [The Legend of Yukio Mishima's Exile]. Ken'ichi Matsumoto Legend Series 2 (in Japanese) (Enlarged ed.). Henkyōsha. ISBN 978-4-326-95039-3.
- Matsumoto, Tōru; Satō, Hideaki; Inoue, Takashi, eds. (2000). 三島由紀夫事典 [Encyclopedia of Yukio Mishima] (in Japanese). Bensei Shuppan. ISBN 978-4-585-06018-5.
- Nakamura, Akihiko (2015) [1st pub. Bungeishunjū:2000]. 三島事件 もう一人の主役―烈士と呼ばれた森田必勝 [Another Protagonist of the Mishima Incident: Masakatsu Morita who Called an Upright Man] (in Japanese) (Enlarged ed.). WAC inc. ISBN 978-4-89831-729-7.
- Nathan, John (1975) [1st pub. Little, Brown and Company:1974]. Mishima: A Biography. Tut books. North Clarendon, Vermont: Tuttle Publishing. ISBN 978-4805304020.
  - Nathan, John (2000). Mishima: A Biography (New ed.). Boston, Massachusetts: Da Capo Press. ISBN 978-0-306-80977-4.
- Nathan, John (2000) [1st pub. 1976 (an out-of-print book)]. 新版 三島由紀夫─ある評伝 [New Edition – Mishima: A Biography] (in Japanese). Translated by Noguchi, Takehiko (New/Revised ed.). Shinchosha. ISBN 978-4-10-505702-2.
- Nishibe, Susumu; Nishimura, Kōyū; Sugihara, Yukihiro; Tomioka, Koichirō (2010-03-01). 憂国忌記念シンポジウム―現代に蘇る三島由紀夫 [Yūkoku-ki Memorial Symposium: Yukio Mishima Revisited in the Modern Age]. Espressivo (in Japanese). 29 (Special). Jorudan: 264–285.
- Nishimura, Shigeki (2019). 三島由紀夫と最後に会った青年将校 [The Young Officer who Met Yukio Mishima Last] (in Japanese). Namiki Shobo. ISBN 978-4-89063-391-3.
- Okamura, Ao (2020) [1st pub. Gendai Shokan:1990]. 三島由紀夫と森田必勝―楯の会事件 若き行動者の軌跡 [Yukio Mishima and Masakatsu Morita: The Tatenokai Incident, the Trajectory of a Young Activist]. Kōjinsha NF Bunko (in Japanese) (Paperback ed.). Ushio Shobo Kōjin Shinsha. ISBN 978-4-7698-3191-4.
- Scott-Stokes, Henry (1985). 三島由紀夫─死と真実 [The Life and Death of Yukio Mishima] (in Japanese). Translated by Tokuoka, Takao. Diamond, Inc. ISBN 978-4-478-94056-3.
  - Scott-Stokes, Henry (1998). 三島由紀夫─生と死 [The Life and Death of Yukio Mishima] (in Japanese). Translated by Tokuoka, Takao (Enlarged/Revised ed.). Seiryu Publ. ISBN 978-4-916028-52-5.
- Scott-Stokes, Henry (2000). The Life and Death of Yukio Mishima (Enlarged/Revised ed.). New York: Cooper Square Press. ISBN 978-0-8154-1074-4.
- Tekina, Osamu (2020). 日本人は豚になる―三島由紀夫の予言 [The Japanese will Become Pigs: Yukio Mishima's Prophecies] (in Japanese). Bestsellers. ISBN 978-4-584-13973-8.
- Toda, Yoshio; Nagafuji, Takeshi (1978). よみがえる三島由紀夫―霊の人の文学と武と [Yukio Mishima Resurrected: The Person of Spirit, His Literature and Martial Arts] (in Japanese). Nippon Kyobunnsha. ISBN 978-4531060924. NCID BN09146011.
- Tokuoka, Takao (1999) [1st pub. 1996]. 五衰の人―三島由紀夫私記 [The Man of the Decay of the Angel: Private Notes about Yukio Mishima] (in Japanese) (Paperback ed.). Bungeishunjū. ISBN 978-4-16-744903-2.
- Yamamoto, Kiyokatsu (2001). 自衛隊「影の部隊」―三島由紀夫を殺した真実の告白 [Japan Self-Defense Forces "A Unit of Shadow": Confession of a Truth that Killed Yukio Mishima] (in Japanese). Kodansha. ISBN 978-4-06-210781-5.
- Yoshida, Kazuaki (1985). 三島由紀夫 [Yukio Mishima]. For Beginners Series 35 (in Japanese). Illustrated by Akira Wakaki. Gendai Shokan. ISBN 978-4-7684-0035-7.
