= Kaishakunin =

Person who beheads someone committing seppuku

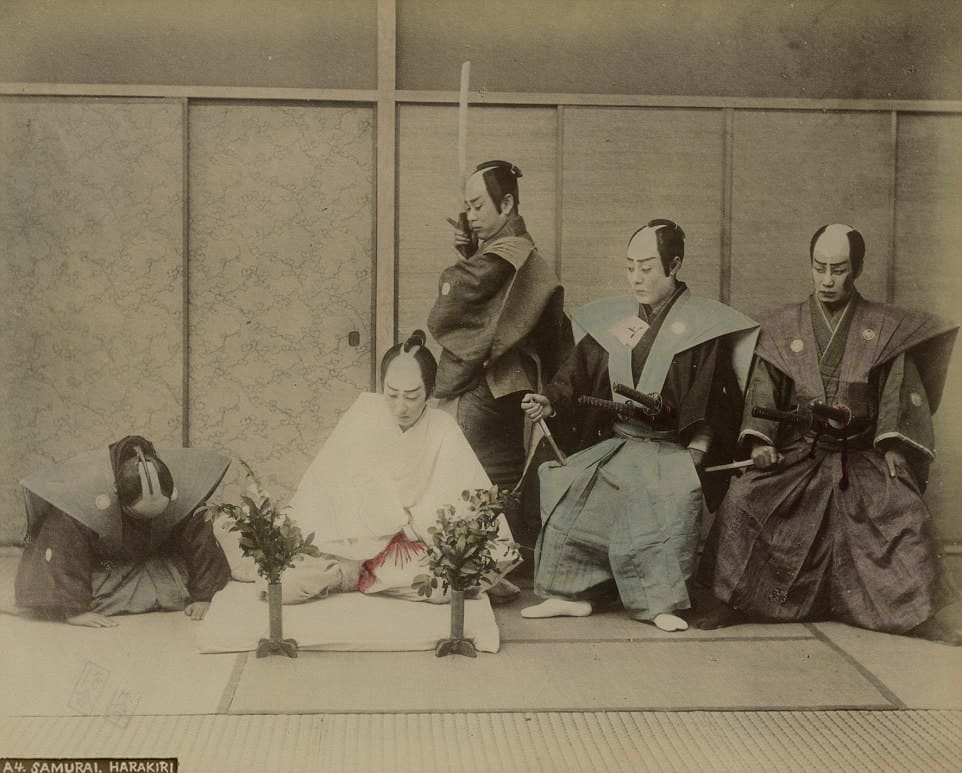
A staged photo from the late Edo period of a seppuku ceremony. The kaishakunin is standing at the rear with his sword raised and prepared to partially sever the head, cutting through the spinal column, of the person performing seppuku.

A kaishakunin (Japanese: 介錯人, lit. 'assist mistake person') is a man appointed to behead an individual who has performed seppuku, Japanese ritual suicide, at the moment of agony. The role played by the kaishakunin is called kaishaku.

This approach spares the condemned person from prolonged pain before death. It also prevents observers from witnessing a distressing and prolonged dying process.

The most recent kaishakunin of the 20th century was Hiroyasu Koga, who beheaded both the novelist Yukio Mishima and the political activist Masakatsu Morita during their seppuku.

== Ritual ==
Still preserved in modern-day movements (kata) of the martial art Iaidō, the ritual of performing kaishaku varies very little between Japanese fencing schools, but all of them are bound to the following steps to be performed by the kaishakunin:

1. First, the kaishakunin sits down in the upright (seiza) position, or remains standing, at the left side of the person about to commit seppuku, at a prudent distance but close enough to be reached with his sword (katana) at the appropriate time.
2. If seated, the kaishakunin will rise slowly, first on his knees, then stepping with the right foot while drawing the katana very slowly and silently and standing up in the same fashion (keeping in mind that the target (teki) is not an enemy, but rather a fellow samurai). If the kaishakunin was in a standing stance, he will draw his sword slowly and silently as well. In both cases, after the sword is out of the scabbard (saya), he will raise it with the right hand and wait for the seppuku to begin. Some classic Iaidō styles, like the Musō Jikiden Eishin-ryū school, establish this "waiting stance" as the kaishakunin having taken one step back with the right foot, katana behind his head parallel to the floor held with the right hand, left hand holding the scabbard in the proper (sayabiki) position; other styles, like Musō Shinden-ryū, establish that the katana is to be held vertically, parallel to the body, held in the right hand, the left hand resting at the kaishakunin side, feet together. In any case, the kaishakunin will always keep eye contact with the samurai performing seppuku, and waiting for his cut through his abdomen.
3. When the samurai actually performs the seppuku, and after he returns the dagger (tantō) back to its place, the kaishakunin steps forward, letting the katana drop straight through the back of the neck of the dying samurai. Just before making contact, the kaishakunin grips the handle (tsuka) with both hands, giving precision to the katana's blade and strength to the downward cut (kiritsuke). The final cut must be controlled in order to reach only half the neck of the samurai; the kaishaku, leaving the required skin to hold the head attached to the samurai's body, was performed by a single slashing/withdrawing motion of the katana. The complete cut-slash-withdraw motion is called daki-kubi.

After the dead samurai falls, the kaishakunin, with the same slow, silent style used when unsheathing the katana, shakes the blood off the blade (a movement called chiburi) and returns the katana to the scabbard (a movement called noto), while kneeling towards the fellow samurai's dead body. When this is completed, the kaishakunin remains kneeling for a while, as a sign of deep respect to the fallen samurai who performed the ritual suicide, always in a state of "total awareness" (zanshin) before standing up and bowing (rei) to his body.

== Role as executioner ==
In some seppuku rituals, no disembowelment occurs. The condemned person merely moves the tantō, or, sometimes, a wooden stick or fan, across his stomach, followed by a beheading by the kaishakunin. In this variation, the kaishakunin becomes in effect the executioner, and seppuku becomes effectively a beheading.

In other seppuku rituals, the cut to the neck may be done as the condemned person simply reaches for the tanto. The reaching gave honor to the condemned, as he was exhibiting intent by doing so, and the "early" stroke of the sword could be dismissed as a small mistake in timing by an overzealous kaishakunin. In reality, this was planned ahead of time to spare the condemned the pain of actually trying to disembowel himself.

== See also ==
- Coup de grâce
- Mozambique drill
