= Masakatsu Morita =

Japanese political activist (1945–1970)

- 森田必勝
- Born: 25 July 1945; Yokkaichi, Mie, Japan
- Died: 25 November 1970 (aged 25); JGSDF Camp Ichigaya; Ichigaya Honmura-chō, Shinjuku, Tokyo, Japan
- Cause of death: Suicide by seppuku
- Body discovered: Office of the General, JGSDF Camp Ichigaya
- Education: Waseda University
- Occupations: Student, political activist
- Years active: 1966–1970
- Organization: Tatenokai (Note: Previously called the Japanese National Guard a paramilitary organization.)
- Known for: Attempting to incite a Coup d'état with Yukio Mishima and ritual suicide
- Title: Head of Students
- Predecessor: Hiroshi Mochimaru
- Movement: Japanese military nationalism
- Opponents: Anti-Japaneseism groups; Communist Political Groups

Masakatsu Morita (森田 必勝, Morita Masakatsu; 25 July 1945 – 25 November 1970) was a Japanese political activist who killed himself via seppuku with Yukio Mishima in Tokyo.

Morita was the youngest child of the headmaster of an elementary school. Losing both parents at the age of three, Morita was cared for by his brother Osamu and educated at a Catholic school. He entered Waseda University in 1966, but was dismayed by the presence of Communist Zengakuren students at the university and became heavily involved in the small right-wing faction at the university. He first met Mishima on 19 June 1967, and joined the Tatenokai at its establishment in October 1968. As early as March of that year, he had written a letter to Mishima expressing a willingness to die for him.

Mishima was interested in using his society for direct political action, and he approached several members in April and May 1970. The inner circle then consisted of Mishima, Morita, Masahiro Ogawa (小川正洋) and Masayoshi Koga (小賀正義) ("Chibi" Koga). No clear plan was developed until late June. Shortly afterwards, Mishima went on holiday to Shimoda and paid for the others to go to Hokkaido. On 2 September in Tokyo, Morita and "Chibi Koga" recruited Hiroyasu Koga (古賀浩靖) ("Furu" Koga), who was a Tatenokai member also, and he met Mishima to hear details of the plan on 9 September.

Originally all four Tatenokai members had planned to commit seppuku along with Mishima. However, Mishima attempted to dissuade them and three of the members acquiesced to his wishes. Only Morita persisted, saying, "I can't let Mr. Mishima die alone." So, in November, Mishima ruled that only he and Morita were to die. Morita said to other members who had wanted to die together, "We are alive or dead together, because we can meet again somewhere." But Mishima knew that Morita had a girlfriend and still hoped he might live. On 21 and 22 November 1970, supplies were bought, and Morita asked Hiroyasu Koga to stand in for him if he should fail to behead Mishima properly. The next two days were spent rehearsing.

On the morning of 25 November, the group drove to the Japan Self-Defense Force's Ichigaya garrison on the pretext of a friendly visit. They barricaded themselves inside General Mashita's office, taking him prisoner, and issued demands. At noon, Mishima began to make a speech from the balcony to assembled troops, but his words were drowned out by helicopters. Immediately after his return from the balcony, Mishima stabbed himself in the abdomen and Morita then attempted to behead him. After three failed attempts by Morita, Hiroyasu Koga stepped in and beheaded Mishima. According to the testimony of the surviving coup members, just before his seppuku, Mishima tried one more time to dissuade Morita, saying "Morita, you must live, not die." (Note: This is the survived member Masayoshi Koga (小賀正義)'s testimony.) Nevertheless, after Mishima's seppuku, Morita knelt and stabbed himself in the abdomen and Koga again performed the kaishakunin duty.

Masayoshi Koga, Masahiro Ogawa, and Hiroyasu Koga, who were tried for various charges, including murder with the victim's consent, were freed from prison for good behavior in October 1974. All three were aged 26 at the time.

== Sources ==
- Andō, Takeshi (1998). 三島由紀夫の生涯 [The Life of Yukio Mishima] (in Japanese). Natsume Shobo. ISBN 978-4-931391-39-0.
- Date, Munekatsu (1972). 裁判記録 「三島由紀夫事件」 [Judicial record of "Mishima Incident"] (in Japanese). Kodansha. NCID BN0140450X.
- Fukusima, Jurō (2005). 再訂資料・三島由紀夫 [Re-edition Document: Yukio Mishima] (in Japanese) (enlarged ed.). Chobunsha. ISBN 978-4886951809. First edition published 1989.
- Hideaki, Satō; Takashi, Inoue; Tōru, Matsumoto, eds. (2000). 三島由紀夫事典 [Encyclopedia of Yukio Mishima] (in Japanese). Benseishuppan. ISBN 978-4585060185.
- Hideaki, Satō; Takashi, Inoue; Takeshi, Yamanaka, eds. (2005). 決定版 三島由紀夫全集・第42巻・年譜・書誌 [Definitive Edition-Yukio Mishima complete works No.42-Biographical sketch and Bibliography] (in Japanese). Shinchosha. ISBN 978-4106425820.
- Hiraoka, Azusa (1996). 伜・三島由紀夫 [My son: Yukio Mishima] (in Japanese) (Paperback ed.). Bungeishunjū. ISBN 978-4167162047. First edition published in May 1972.
- Inukai, Kiyoshi (2020). 三島由紀夫と死んだ男―森田必勝の生涯 [A man who died with Yukio Mishima: The life of Masakatsu Morita] (in Japanese). Shumei University Press. ISBN 978-4915855405.
- Mochimaru, Hiroshi; Satō, Matsuo (2010). 証言 三島由紀夫・福田恆存 たった一度の対決 [Testimonies: The Only Once Confrontation between Yukio Mishima and Tsuneari Fukuda] (in Japanese). Bungeishunjū. ISBN 978-4-16-373250-3.
- Nakamura, Akihiko (2015). 三島事件 もう一人の主役―烈士と呼ばれた森田必勝 [Another protagonist of Mishima Incident: Masakatsu Morita who called Upright man] (in Japanese). Wakku. ISBN 978-4898317297.
