= Hiroyasu Koga =

Japanese shintoist (born 1947)

Japanese name
- Kanji: 古賀浩靖
- Born: 15 August 1947 (age 78); Takikawa, Hokkaido, Japan
- Other names: Furu-Koga; Hiroyasu Arechi (荒地浩靖)
- Education: Kanagawa University
- Known for: Role of kaishakunin in the 1970 Mishima Incident

Hiroyasu Koga (Japanese: 古賀浩靖 Koga Hiroyasu, born 15 August 1947) is a former Tatenokai member and kaishakunin responsible for the decapitations of Yukio Mishima and Masakatsu Morita during their seppuku on November 25, 1970. He studied law at Kanagawa University and intended to become a lawyer.

Koga, known by the nickname Furu-Koga (distinguishing him from another Tatenokai member named Masayoshi Koga who was in turn nicknamed Chibi-Koga, 小賀), was a skilled practitioner of kendo (swordsmanship). It was originally planned that Mishima would be decapitated by Masakatsu Morita, the Tatenokai's student leader; however, Morita was not trained in the sword and failed, at which point Koga stepped in to complete it. Koga then decapitated Morita as part of Morita's own seppuku.

Koga and two other participating Tatenokai members (Masayoshi Koga and Masahiro Ogawa) went on trial on March 24, 1971, facing charges of bodily injury, violence, illegal possession of firearms and swords, and assisting a suicide. They were convicted and sentenced to four years' penal servitude, and were released in 1974, a few months early.

As of 2005, it was believed that he was a practising Shinto priest at a shrine on Shikoku. However, an alternative belief is that he never became a Shinto priest, instead becoming the head of the Hokkaido branch of Seicho-no-Ie and was renamed Hiroyasu Arechi. It is further posited that he now resides in Kumamoto.
