= Shumei University =

Coordinates: 35°46′21.7″N 140°5′57.2″E

Shūmei University
- 秀明大学; Shūmei daigaku
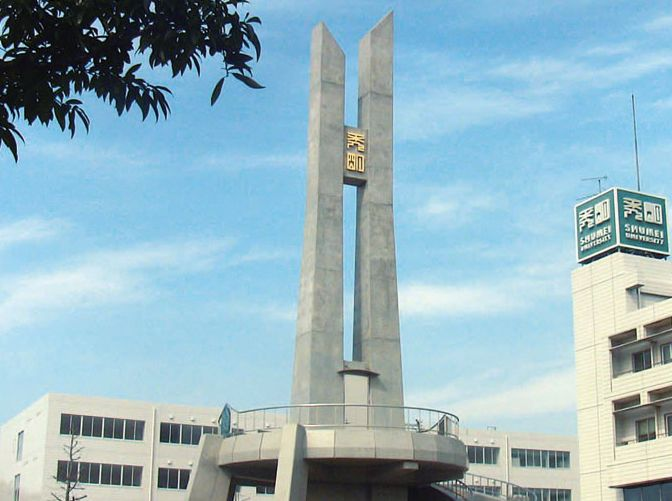
- Type: private
- Established: 1998
- Affiliations: Chaucer College
- Chancellor: Luke Warren
- Location: 1-1, Daigaku-chō, Yachiyo, Chiba prefecture, Japan, Yachiyo, Chiba Prefecture, Japan
- Website: Official homepage (Japanese)

Shūmei University (秀明大学, Shūmei Daigaku) is a private university in Japan. The main campus is located in Yachiyo, Chiba, and the headquarters is located in Nakano, Tokyo. The university was founded as the Yachiyo International University in 1988.

== Overview ==
Founded as the Yachiyo International University, Shumei University was established in 1998. Prior to the establishment, the Chaucer College Canterbury, also called as the Shumei Canterbury College, was established by Hiroshi Kawashima in 1992 in the area of the University of Kent in Kent, England. Almost all the freshman students at Shumei University are supposed to go and study at the Chaucer College Canterbury for a year, and come back to Japan and study at the campus in Yachiyo when they turn to Sophomore. Students must experience at least a month homestay during freshman period in England.

== See also ==
Chaucer College
