= University of Nagano =

University in Nagano, Nagano Prefecture, Japan

The University of Nagano
- 長野県立大学
- University of Nagano
- Former names: Nagano Prefectural College Japanese: 長野県短期大学, romanized: Nagano-ken Tanki Daigaku
- Type: Public
- Established: 2018
- Chairman: Kunitake Andō
- President: Masumi Kindaichi
- Location: Nagano, Nagano, Japan; 36°39′59″N 138°12′01″E
- Campus: Regional core city
- Website: http://www.u-nagano.ac.jp/en/

The University of Nagano (長野県立大学, Nagano Kenritsu Daigaku; Nagano Prefectural University), abbreviated as Kendai (県大), is a co-educational 4-year public university located in Nagano, Nagano, Japan. It is the newest of the ten major universities in Nagano Prefecture. The University of Nagano consists of two campuses, named for their locations, Miwa Campus and Gocho Campus, respectively. Both campuses are open to the public.

The University of Nagano should not be confused with Nagano University (長野大学, Nagano daigaku), a formerly private, public as of 2017, university located in Ueda, Nagano.

== History ==
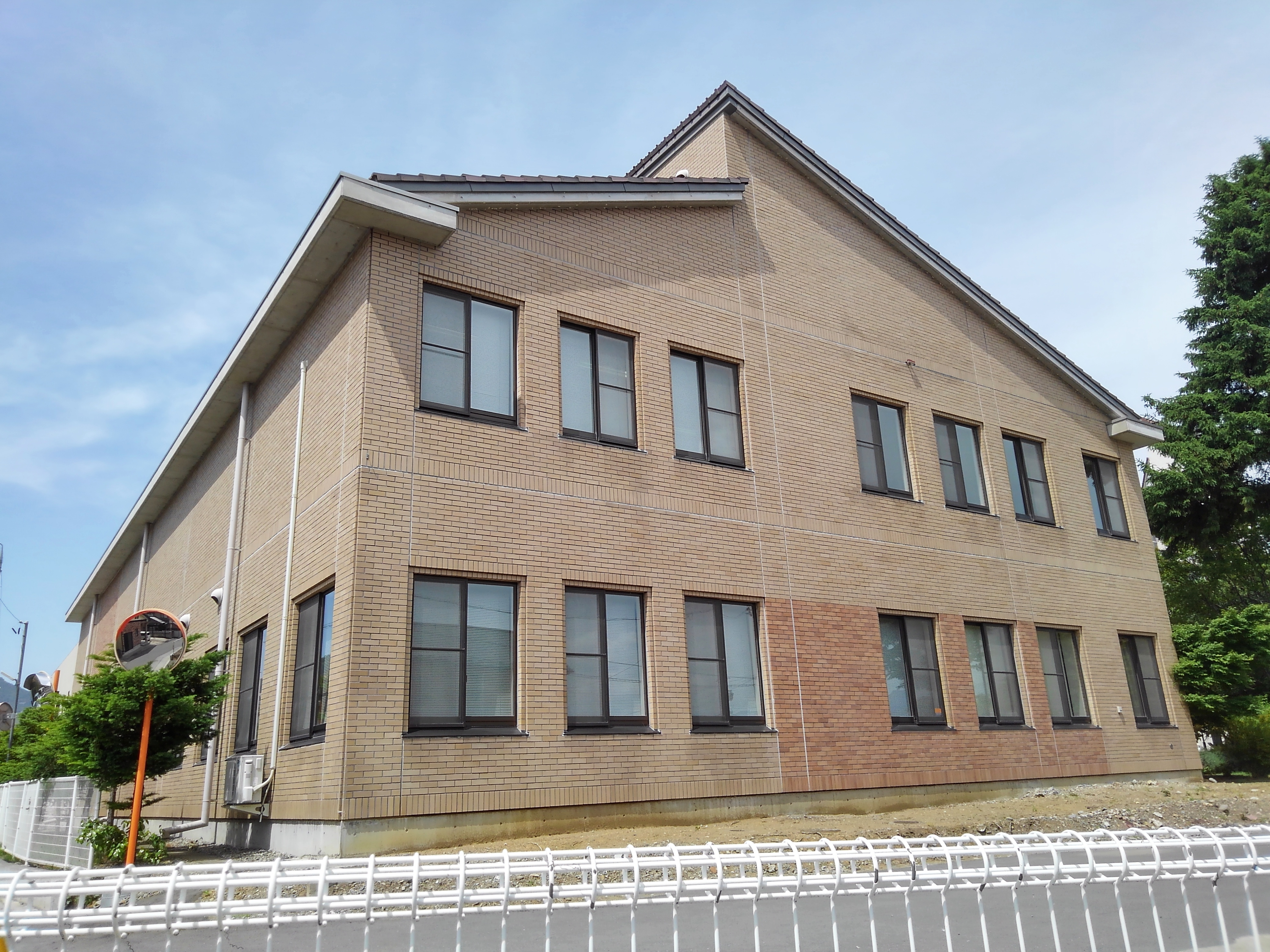
Library building succeeded from Nagano Prefectural College

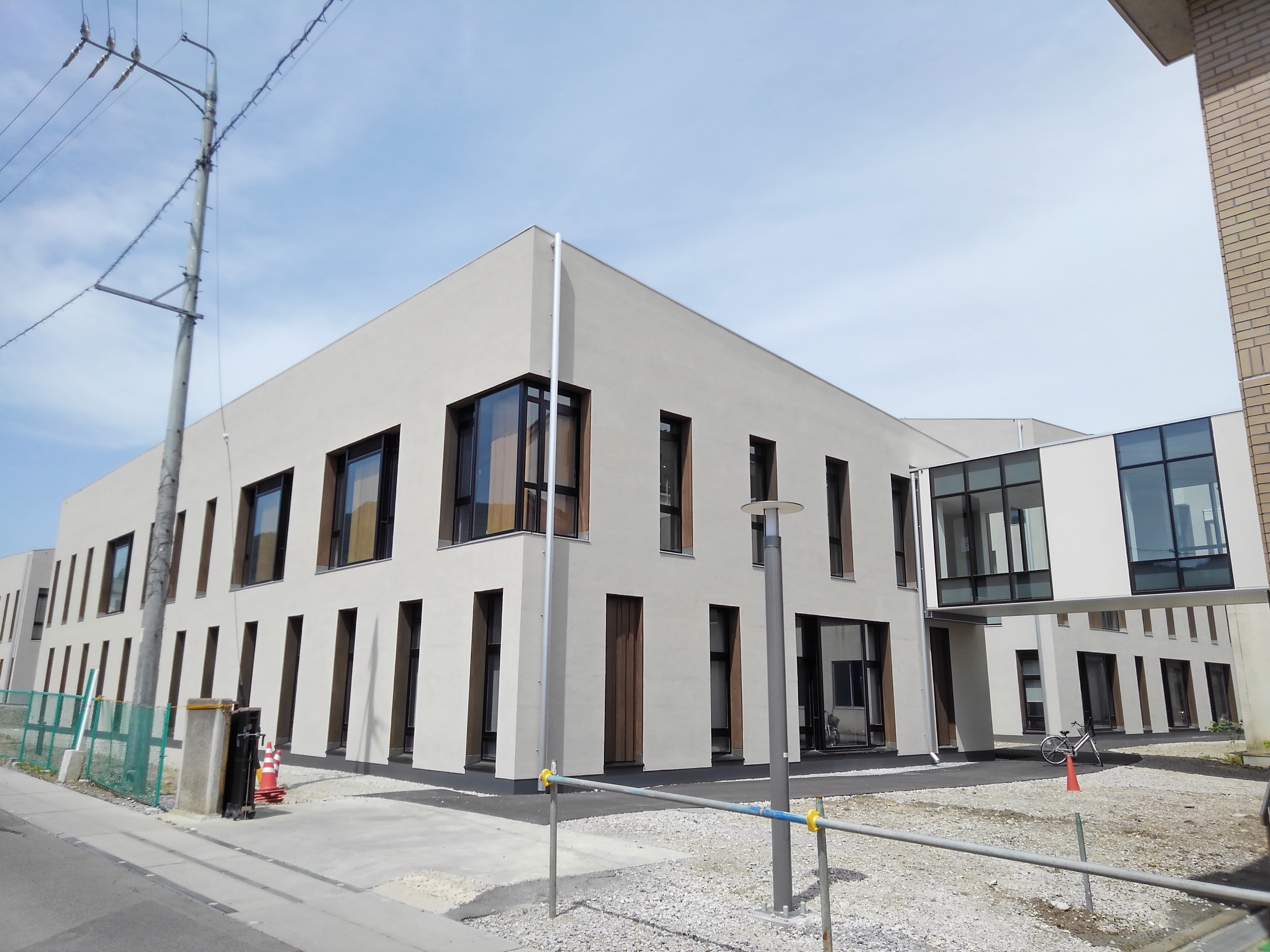
Newer buildings at Miwa Campus (fences under construction)

The University of Nagano opened in April 2018. The school was first established by Nagano Prefecture as a women's school in 1929 before becoming a women's junior college in 1950. It became co-educational in 2004.

For several decades, plans regarding a transition to a 4-year university were both proposed and opposed, particularly by established local public and private universities. The main criticisms were the impending decline in the number of prospective students and the potential overlap in majors with other universities in the prefecture, while the main arguments for the transition to a 4-year university were the cultivation of businesses and young people within the prefecture and stemming the outflow of industry, talent, and tax money.

After the decision was made to transition to a 4-year university, the prefectural university foundation special committee was formed in September 2008 to lay groundwork for the university. The junior college officially began preparation to transition to a 4-year university in 2011 under the then-recently elected Nagano Prefectural Governor Shuichi Abe. The official name of the university and details about the entrance requirements and student intake were finalized and announced in March 2016. The English-language name of the university and the website were unveiled on 31 October 2016.

As a public prefectural university, its budget, deliberations, and current state of affairs are made public knowledge and continuously updated by the prefectural government. For the inaugural class of 2018, the percentage of students attending from within Nagano Prefecture is 58%, while the percentage of out-of-prefecture students is 42%.

The university is headed by former Sony President and chief operating officer, Kunitake Ando, and Keio University Professor Emeritus, Masumi Kindaichi, who is also the son of the famous Japanese linguist, Haruhiko Kindaichi, and grandson of Kyosuke Kindaichi.

== Campuses ==
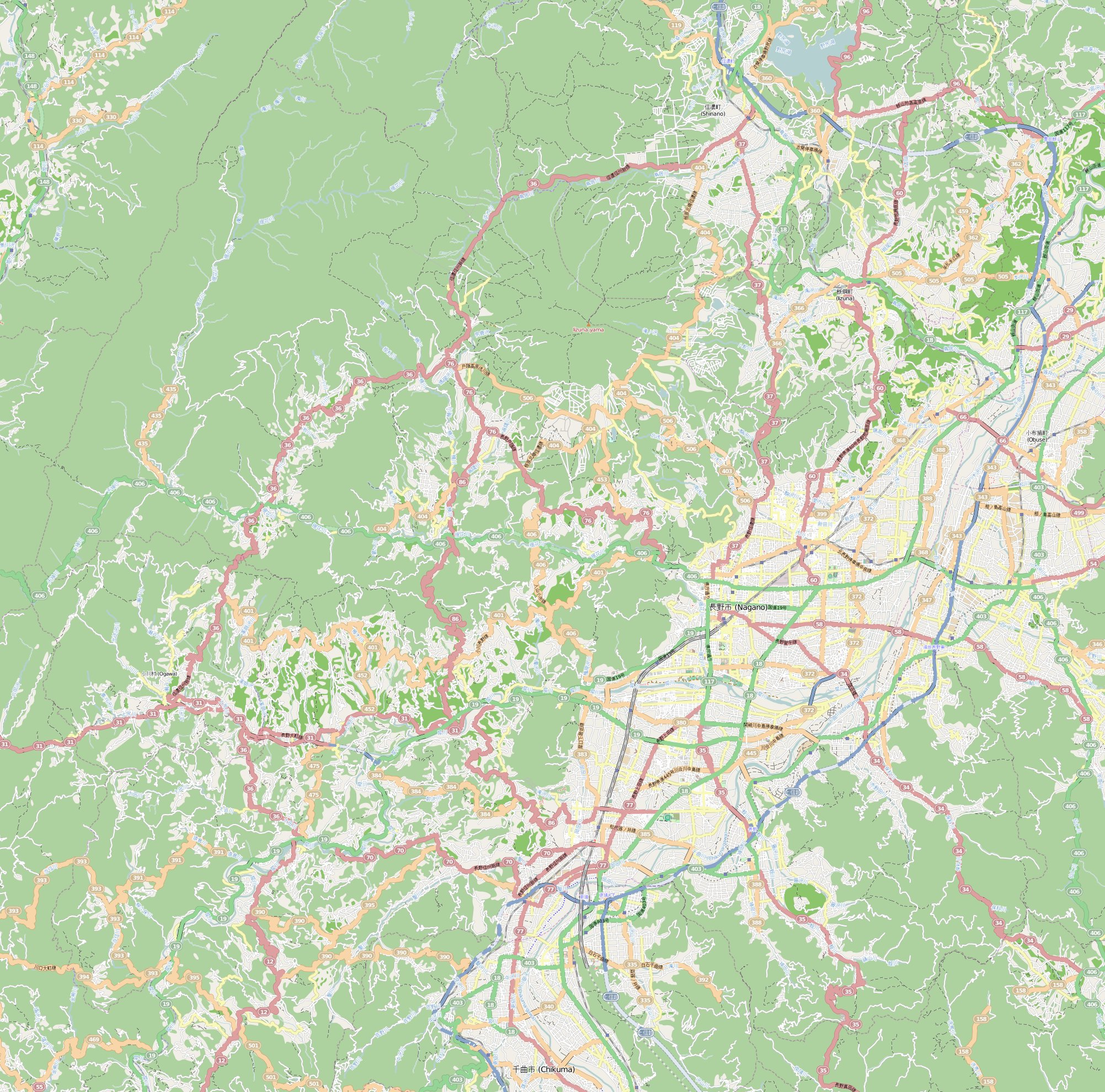
University of Nagano campuses with Nagano Station

The university consists of two campuses, which are both open to the public. They are named for their locations, and hence are called the Miwa Campus, near Hongō Station (Nagano) (本郷駅, Hongō-eki) and Gocho Campus, near Gondō Station (権堂駅, Gondō-eki), respectively. Each year they host two major events: Open Campus Days in July and August; and The University of Nagano School Festival in October.

=== Miwa Campus ===
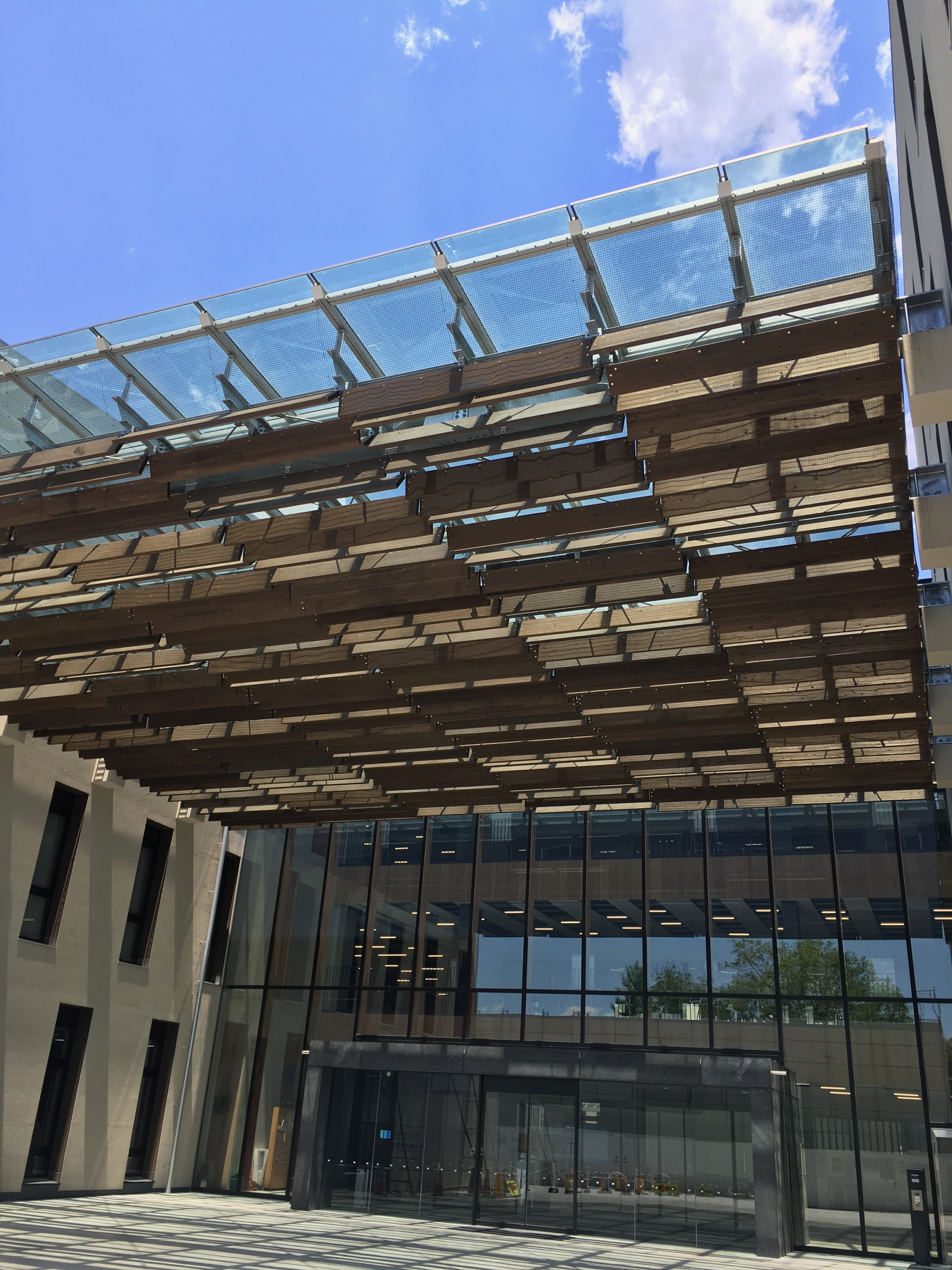
Close-up of the entrance

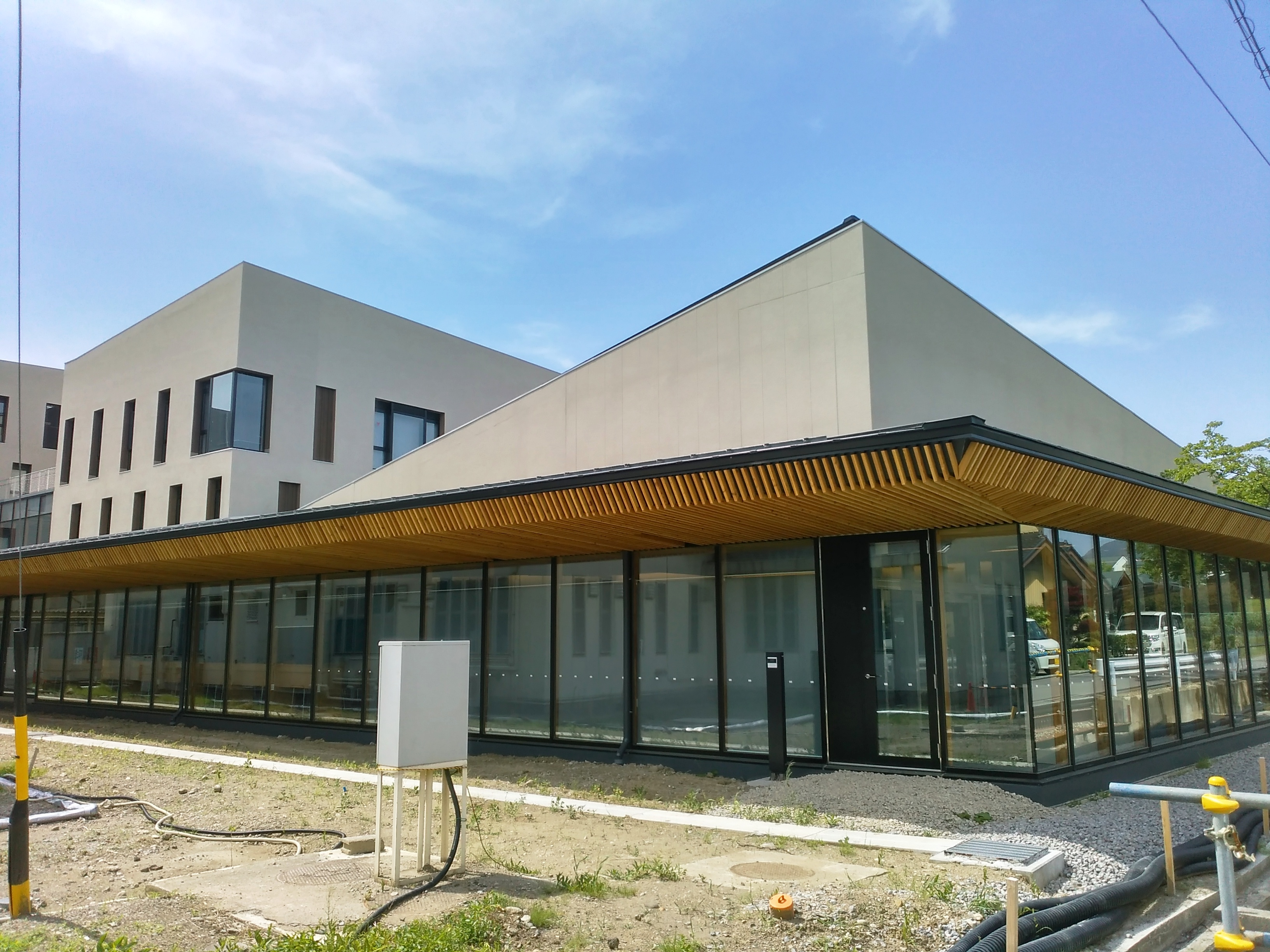
Cafeteria at Miwa Campus during construction

The main university campus in Miwa, near Miwa Jinja (美和神社), was completed in 2018. It currently houses a complex which is over 10,610 square meters, not including the grounds. Built of native Nagano Prefecture lumber and other building materials, it boasts a natural geothermal air conditioning system, glass-walled classrooms and offices, a spacious cafeteria which is also open to the public on weekdays, and a library which is also open to the public on weekdays and Saturdays. The Miwa campus was built directly behind the Nagano Prefectural College campus, which was torn down in 2019.

==== Global Center ====
The Global Center serves as the international affairs office for the university. This includes organizing the study abroad program, as well as providing materials and support, academic training, and opportunities for foreign language study. It has an office staffed by multi-lingual employees who are available for consultation by university students and faculty, as well as international students during their study in Japan.

==== Library ====
The University of Nagano Library is a community accessible library, open to students, staff, and the general public, Monday-Saturday. The library was constructed using various wood and lumber materials from Nagano Prefecture. The library includes counters and tables for study as well as booths and rooms for individual or group study. In addition to its collection of Japanese books, the library includes a large collection of graded readers in English, newspapers and magazines, and offers access to online data bases including ProQuest, OPAC, CiNii, J-Stage, Webcat and JAIRO.

=== Gocho Campus ===
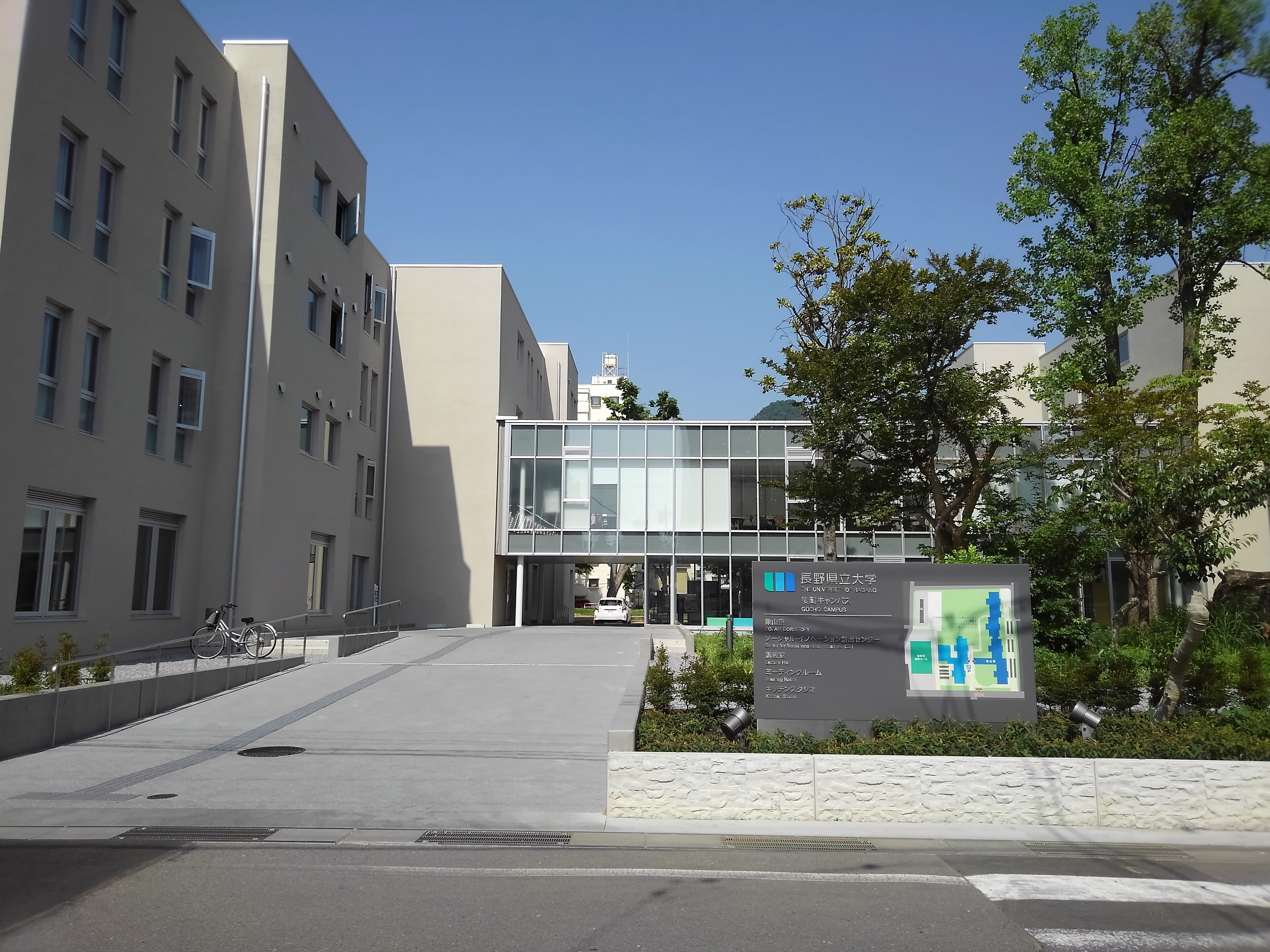
Gocho Campus

The university dormitory and community campus in Gocho was built on the site of a decommissioned elementary school Nagano Gocho Elementary School (長野市立後町小学校, Nagano-shiritsu Gocho Elementary School) in the downtown area of Nagano. The Gocho community campus includes rentable kitchens, conference rooms, and a lecture hall.

==== Zozan Dormitory ====
All first-year students are required to live in the centrally located student dormitory to foster relationships between students and the community. The student dormitory system is highly unusual for a university in Japan. It is similar to dormitories which exist in overseas universities, such as in the United States. Each dorm room houses two students in a partitionable room, and a group of eight dorm rooms share a common living room, kitchen, eating, and study area.

Zozan Dormitory is named after the 19th Century Japanese rangaku (literally "Dutch learning", and by extension "Western learning") scholar, engineer, and politician Sakuma Shōzan who was born in Shinshū (信州) (or Shinano Province) (present day Nagano Prefecture) during the Edo period.

Sakuma Zozan, a scholar of Western learning in the last days of the Tokugawa Shogunate, was born in Shinshu. The young people who learned at his private school became a driving force in pioneering a new age. The University of Nagano aims to act as a source for regional revitalization and reinvigoration and as a base for knowledge that will activate industry, culture, and lifestyles in Nagano.

==== The Center for Social Innovation Initiatives (CSI) ====
The Center for Social Innovation Initiatives (CSI), which aims to connect academia, industry, government, and the community, is also located in Gocho. The CSI focuses on developing solutions, products, and services for contemporary social problems, such as the declining birth rate, aging population, and environmental pressures, from a business perspective.

On 5 February 2019, the university signed a comprehensive cooperation agreement with the Nagano Prefectural government and Nihon Unisys on social innovation to solve regional issues.

== Academics ==
=== Faculties ===
The university comprises two faculties and three departments:

- Faculty of Global Management Studies
  - Department of Global Management Studies
    - Global Business
    - Entrepreneurship
    - Public Management
- Faculty of Health and Human Development
  - Department of Food and Health Sciences
  - Department of Child Development and Education

=== Curriculum ===
Unlike other universities in Japan, the university operates on a quarter system. Each academic year is divided into four-quarters instead of the traditional two semester system. In addition, each class period is 100 minutes in length instead of the typical 90-minute university class. Finally, many courses meet twice per week, compared to the more usual once per week schedule at other universities in Japan.

=== Eminent Speakers' Forum on Global Development ===
The Eminent Speakers' Forum on Global Development, which began in 2019, provides a series of English-language public lectures on global development. This Forum covers a range of topics and issues, including economics, finance, human development, regional integration, environment, climate change, and career development. Speakers have included Shinji Asanuma (Hitotsubashi University); Fernando Aldaba (Ateneo de Manila University); Emanuel Mori (former President of the Federated States of Micronesia); and Andrew Parker (regional Asian senior adviser at the United Nations Development Programme).

== International Exchanges ==
All students are required to study abroad as part of the general education curriculum. International partnerships and exchanges have been made with global institutions in the following locations:

- University of Leicester in Leicester, United Kingdom
- University of Missouri in Columbia, Missouri, USA
- Ateneo de Manila University in Quezon City, Metro Manila, Philippines
- Lincoln University (New Zealand) and Ara Institute of Canterbury in Christchurch, New Zealand
- Folkuniversitetet in Uppsala, Sweden
- University of Helsinki and Omnia in Helsinki, Finland

== English-language Education ==
The university emphasizes both content education conducted in English and English-language education, including English for Academic Purposes and English for Specific Purposes. The "English Program for Global Mobility" (EPGM) is an intensive two-year course of study for all undergraduate students. It is designed to equip students with academic skills and prepare them for overseas study. All students are required to study abroad. English-language elective courses will also be offered by faculty members.

In 2020, as a response to the COVID-19 pandemic, the EPGM launched a weekly English-language social for students and faculty on Zoom.

== Self access language learning centers ==
Located on the first floor of the Miwa Campus is the Media Plaza which is a learning commons with 2 CALL rooms, 10 individual CALL booths, group study areas equipped with whiteboards, 12 study desks, 16 semi-private and 10 private study carrels, and a resource library. The resource library has newspapers, magazines, DVDs, and TOEIC self-study materials. It also has brochures, maps, and information in foreign languages about destinations abroad and in Japan available.

The Global Language Table (GLT) is an unmoderated lunchtime language table, sponsored by a student circle and faculty adviser, to encourage peer learning and lifelong learning. In keeping with the ethos of the university and of self access language learning centers, the GLT promotes student-centered learning, learner autonomy, and self-directed learning. Attendees can chat freely about any topic in any foreign language. The university currently offers courses in Chinese, French, German, and Spanish. Special GLT events in 2018 and 2019 have included Korean, Tagalog, German, Spanish, Italian, French, Slovak, Czech, and Danish-speaking guests. In 2020, the GLT switched to an online format on Zoom with special guests from the UK, Trinidad, US, Jamaica, and the Netherlands.

== See also ==
- List of universities in Japan
