= Ken Kutaragi =

Japanese engineering technologist and businessman (born 1950)

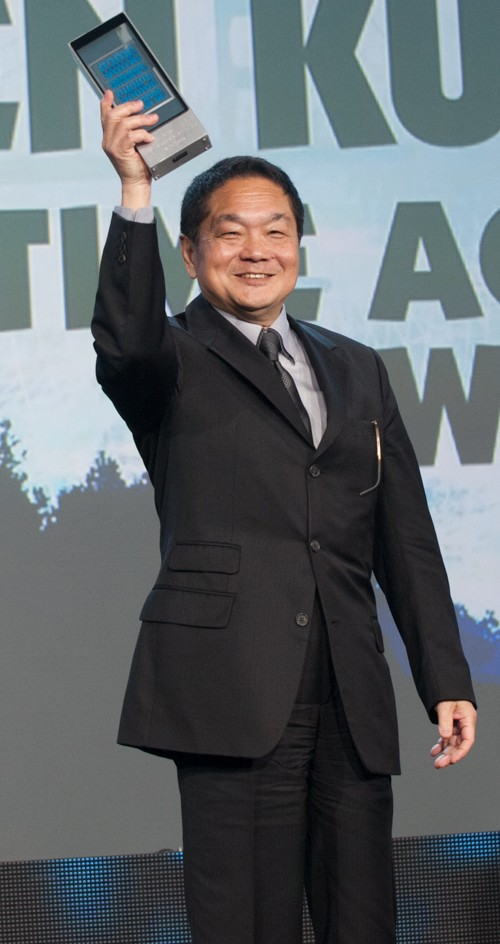
- Kutaragi with his Lifetime Achievement Award at the Game Developers Choice Awards 2014
- Born: 2 August 1950 (age 76); Kōtō, Tokyo, Japan
- Education: University of Electro-Communications
- Occupations: Engineering technologist; businessman
- Known for: PlayStation, Sony Interactive Entertainment, Cellius
- Children: 1

Ken Kutaragi (久夛良木 健, Kutaragi Ken; born 2 August 1950) is a Japanese engineering technologist and businessman, currently president and CEO of Cyber AI Entertainment. Formerly the chairman and CEO of Sony Computer Entertainment (SCE), the video game division of Sony, Kutaragi is known as "The Father of the PlayStation" having overseen the development of the original console and its successors and spinoffs until departing the company in 2007, shortly after the PlayStation 3 was released.

Kutaragi had also designed the sound processor for the Super Nintendo Entertainment System. With Sony, he designed the VLSI chip that works in conjunction with the PS1's RISC CPU to handle the graphics rendering.

== Early years ==
Kutaragi was born in Tokyo, Japan, in 1950. His parents, although not wealthy by Japanese standards, still managed to own their own business, a small printing plant in the city. As Kutaragi grew into childhood, they actively encouraged the young boy to explore his mechanical abilities in the plant, and he worked after school there. Aside from his duties in his parents' factory, Kutaragi was a studious, high-level student.

Kutaragi always had the desire to "tinker", often taking apart toys as a child rather than playing with them. This curiosity carried from childhood, leading him as a teenager to learn the intricacies of electronics. Eventually, in fact, his love of electronics led to him enrolling in University of Electro-Communications, where he acquired an Electronics degree in the 1970s.

Immediately after graduation, Kutaragi began working for Sony in their digital research labs in the mid-1970s. Although at the time it was considered a radical decision, Kutaragi felt that Sony was on the "fast track". He quickly gained a reputation as an excellent problem solver and a forward-thinking engineer, earning that reputation by working on many successful projects, including early liquid crystal displays (LCDs) and digital cameras.

== Career ==
In 1983, he was watching his two-year-old daughter play a Famicom and realized the potential that existed within video games. Thus, when Nintendo expressed the need for a sound chip for its upcoming new 16-bit system, Kutaragi accepted the offer. Working in secret, he designed the chip, the SPC700. At that particular time, Sony's executives had no interest in video games. When they found out about the secret collaboration, they were furious. Only with Sony CEO Norio Ohga's approval was Kutaragi able to complete the chip and keep his job.

Even while working with Nintendo, within Sony, gaming was still regarded as a fad. Despite this hostile atmosphere to video games, Kutaragi managed to persuade Ohga into working with Nintendo to develop a CD-ROM add-on for the Super NES that would be released alongside a Sony branded console that could play both Super NES cartridges and CD games. These efforts resulted in a device called the "Play Station". Eventually, the partnership between Sony and Nintendo faltered due to licensing disagreements, but Kutaragi and Sony continued to develop their own console. He wanted to utilize Sony's access to the latest technology in creating the most powerful home console available, unlike Nintendo, which used relatively orthodox technology to create their consoles. He also noticed that Nintendo focused mainly on children, so he wanted Sony's console to target older adult gamers, as he felt it was a market not yet tapped by any of the available home consoles. Kutaragi later recalled staying up all night working on the console design for several nights in a row "because our work was so interesting." Despite being considered a risky gamble by other Sony executives, Kutaragi once again had the support of Ohga and several years later the company released the original PlayStation. The success of the PlayStation led to him heading up the development of successor consoles, the PlayStation 2 and PlayStation 3.

The commercial success of the PlayStation franchise makes Sony Computer Entertainment the most profitable business division of Sony. Despite being an upstart in the console market against veterans Nintendo and Sega, the first PlayStation displaced them both to become the most popular console of that era. The PlayStation 2 extended Sony's lead in the following generation, at one point holding a 65% market share with 100 million units shipped. Kutaragi was recognized by many financial and technological publications for this success, most notably when he was named one of the 100 most influential people of 2004 in TIME magazine and the "Gutenberg of Video Games".

In 1997 Kutaragi was appointed CEO of Sony Computer Entertainment America, and accordingly moved to California. Since 1997, Kutaragi had been favoured to become the next Sony president. He enjoyed a close relationship with Ohga. Ohga's successor Nobuyuki Idei promoted Kutaragi to Deputy Executive President, Sony-Global chief operating officer, and Vice-Chairman in 2003.

On 30 November 2006, Kutaragi was replaced as president of Sony Computer Entertainment by Kazuo Hirai, the President of SCE America. In addition to other management changes, Kutaragi was promoted to chairman of SCEI, and retained his position as chief executive officer of the group. On 26 April 2007, it was announced that Kutaragi would retire and instead take up the role of Honorary Chairman. Taking over his position would be then Hirai, who would eventually be promoted to president and CEO of Sony. On 29 June 2011, following the reshuffling of management, Sony announced that on 28 June 2011, Kutaragi had stepped down as honorary chairman of SCEI. Kutaragi relinquished active management of the business he created and built in 2007, when he stepped down as executive chairman and group CEO of Sony Computer Entertainment. He has remained at Sony as senior technology advisor.

Ken Kutaragi later became president and CEO of Cyber AI Entertainment, Inc. He also serves on the boards of Kadokawa Group Holdings, Inc., Nojima Corporation, and Rakuten, Inc. In 2009, he became a visiting professor of Ritsumeikan University. In 2020, Kutaragi became CEO of Tokyo-based AI and robotics startup Ascent Robotics, after serving on its Board of Directors since 2018.

=== Assessment by industry analysts ===
Although Kutaragi's leadership of consumer electronics was not successful, analysts also suspect that outgoing Sony CEO Nobuyuki Idei had set up Kutaragi to fail, given that both men had a cool working relationship. Idei assigned Kutaragi the tedious task of turning around the consumer division, which had already been falling behind competitors such as Samsung in the LCD market. Kutaragi's rival for the top position, Howard Stringer, was given the less difficult assignment of the content business and his success at Sony BMG Music Entertainment resulted in his promotion.

Sony Interactive Entertainment, which Kutaragi had been heading since its inception, had a weaker year in 2004 after several years of solid growth. During that same year, Sony's game sales fell to $7.5 billion from $8.2 billion, and its operating income slid to $650 million from $1 billion, losing $25 million in Q4 of 2004. This can be attributed partially to the over-saturation of the video game market and price wars that caused the PS2 to lose the top sales position for a time.

=== Seventh generation game consoles ===
Kutaragi has labelled the Xbox 360 as "just an Xbox 1.5" and stated that it was "only going after PlayStation 2". However, SCE Executive Tetsuhiko Yasuda did not consider Microsoft to be a competitor, and has said that they might consider working on games together. In September 2006 Kutaragi admitted that the shortage of PlayStation 3 consoles to North America and Japan as well as the postponing of the console's debut in Europe put Sony's strength in hardware in decline.
