= Kunitake =

- Gender: Male

Origin
- Origin: Japanese
- Meaning: Different meanings depending on the kanji used

Kunitake (written: 国威, 国武 or 邦武) is a masculine Japanese given name. Notable people with the name include:

- Aimi Kunitake (國武 愛美; born 1997), Japanese women's footballer
- Kunitake Andō (安藤 国威; born 1942), Japanese businessman
- Kume Kunitake (久米 邦武; 1839–1931), Japanese historian
- Watanabe Kunitake (渡辺 国武; 1846–1919), Japanese politician

Kunitake (written: 国武) is also a Japanese surname. Notable people with the surname include:

- Hiroaki Kunitake (国武 大晃; born 2002), Japanese snowboarder
