= Yamamoto Tatsurō =

Japanese historian (1910–2001)

- Born: June 16, 1910; Tokyo, Japan
- Died: January 24, 2001 (aged 90)
- Title: Junior Fifth Rank, Order of the Rising Sun, 4th Class, Gold Rays with Rosette
- Spouse: Sumiko Yamamoto (1914–1997) (Note: Author of Research on the History of Chinese Christianity)

Academic background
- Education: Doctor of Literature (1951, University of Tokyo)

Academic work
- Institutions: University of Tokyo; International Christian University; Tōyō Bunko
- Main interests: Oriental history (Southeast Asian history, Indian history)

Yamamoto Tatsurō (June 16, 1910 – January 24, 2001) was a Japanese historian of Oriental history. He served as a Professor Emeritus at the University of Tokyo and was a recipient of the Order of Culture. He is known as the person who proposed the Japanese era name "Heisei". His wife was Sumiko (壽美子), the second daughter of Kunizo Hara.

== Biography ==
Born in Tokyo. His biological father was Shinichiro Matsumura, who served as a member of the House of Peers. He was adopted by his grandfather, Baron Tatsuo Yamamoto—who served as the 5th governor of the Bank of Japan, Minister of Finance, Minister of Agriculture and Commerce, and Minister of Home Affairs—and succeeded as the head of the family. In his early childhood, he attended Gyokusei Kindergarten, which promoted new early childhood education and was founded by Bella Irwin, (Note: The founder of Gyokusei Kindergarten was the eldest daughter of Robert W. Irwin.) and became part of its second graduating class. (Note: He attended the kindergarten's 50th-anniversary celebration in 1966 and reminisced about his feelings toward Bella Irwin.)

After graduating from the Department of Oriental Literature at the Faculty of Letters, Tokyo Imperial University in 1933, he served as a researcher at the Academy of Oriental Culture, and gained attention with his 1934 paper, "Zheng He's Western Expeditions." (Note: "Zheng He's Western Expeditions" (Part 1) and (Part 2).) After serving as a lecturer at Tokyo High School, he became an assistant professor at Tokyo Imperial University in 1942. In April 1949, he was promoted to Professor of the Department of Oriental History (Southern History Course) at the Faculty of Letters, University of Tokyo. In November of the same year, he received the Mainichi Academic Encouragement Grant and went to study at Harvard University. In 1951, he obtained his Doctor of Literature degree from the University of Tokyo. In 1952, he won the Japan Academy Prize for his work Study of Annamese History. From 1953, he served as a councilor and director of the Tōyō Bunko, during which he launched the Modern China Research Committee of the library (now the Tōyō Bunko Modern China Research Group). He served as the department head at the University of Tokyo for a long time and retired in 1971. Following his retirement, he served as a professor at International Christian University (Note: KAKENHI Research "Study of Cultural Friction in East Asia and Southeast Asia - Creation of a Contemporary History Chronology of Southeast Asia" 1977, 1978, and 1979.) and as a visiting professor at Yale University and Cornell University. He was a member of the Japan Academy.

His specialties were Southeast Asian history and Indian history. He organized the Southern History Research Group (the predecessor to the Japan Society for Southeast Asian Studies (Note: The Southern History Research Group is one of the foundational bodies of the current Japan Society for Southeast Asian Studies.)). He died of heart failure in 2001. According to his wishes, his book collection was added to the Tōyō Bunko (excluding those destroyed during World War II).

From the final years of the Showa era, he had been commissioned by the Government of Japan to consider a "new era name" anticipating the passing of Emperor Showa. The name "Heisei" proposed by Yamamoto officially became the new era name following the enthronement of Crown Prince Akihito on January 7, 1989. However, Yamamoto himself never disclosed the fact that he was the proposer of 'Heisei' until his death.

== Authored and co-authored books ==
- 印度支那諸民族に関する民族学的研究の現状 (Current Status of Ethnological Research on the Peoples of Indochina). Imperial Academy, 1942.
- 世界史概観 (Overview of World History). Edited by the Historical Society of the Faculty of Letters, University of Tokyo: Co-authored with Kentaro Murakawa and Kentaro Hayashi. Yamakawa Shuppansha, 1949.
  - Reprint Edition: Yamakawa Shuppansha, 2019. ISBN 978-4634641662.
- 安南史研究 (Study of Annamese History) (in Japanese), Yamakawa Shuppansha, 1950, NCID BN10437827
- 世界史 (World History). Co-authored with Kentaro Murakawa, Namio Egami, and Kentaro Hayashi. Yamakawa Shuppansha, 1952. Retitled Detailed World History from 1964.
- 歴史の見方 (How to Look at History). Sanseido <Social Studies History Library>, 1957.
- デリー：デリー諸王朝時代の建造物の研究 (Delhi: Architectural Remains of the Delhi Sultanate Period) <3 Volumes>. Edited by the University of Tokyo Indian Historical Site Investigation Team: Co-authored with Matsuo Ara and Tokifusa Tsukinowa. Institute of Oriental Culture, University of Tokyo.
  - I 遺跡総目録 (General Catalog of Ruins). 1967. NCID BN05244460.
  - II 墓建築 (Tomb Architecture). 1969. NCID BN05244609.
  - III 水利施設 (Water Facilities). 1970. NCID BN05244631.
- Osamu Yamaguchi, Yamamoto Tatsurō, Kinji Hidemura, Yasushi Inoue (1968). 東洋の専制帝国 : 明と清 (Oriental Despotic Empires: Ming and Qing). World History (in Japanese). Shueisha. ndldm:2973577 NCID BN09392685.
- Kentaro Murakawa, Namio Egami, Yamamoto Tatsurō, Kentaro Hayashi (1977). Essential World History 要説世界史 (in Japanese) (Revised ed.). Yamakawa Shuppansha. NCID BA65486309 CRID 1130000794781071232.

== Edited books ==
- Yamamoto Tatsurō (Ed.) (1958). 岩波小辞典世界史 東洋 (Iwanami Concise Dictionary of World History: The Orient) (in Japanese). Iwanami Shoten.
- Yamamoto Tatsurō, Hiroyuki Mori, Hiroshi Ogawa, Kazuko Saito, Masaharu Sawakabu, Takeshi Sawamoto, Koshin Otani, Zenno Ikuno, Kyosho Hayashima (1969). 東南アジアの宗教と政治 (Religion and Politics in Southeast Asia) (in Japanese). Japan Institute of International Affairs. doi:10.11501/12262106. 74006589 NCID BN01897815.
- 東南アジアにおける権力構造の史的考察 (Historical Considerations of Power Structures in Southeast Asia). Takeuchi Shoten, 1969.
- ベトナム中国関係史 (History of Vietnam-China Relations). Yamakawa Shuppansha, 1975.
- 比較文化の試み (Attempts in Comparative Culture). Kenkyusha Publishing, 1977.

== Book reviews ==
- "Gordon H. Luce; Old Burma-Early Pagan, Vol.1～3, 1969-70", Southeast Asia: History and Culture, Japan Society for Southeast Asian Studies, October 28, 1971, pp. 146–151. (Note: Author: Gordon H. Luce Old Burma - early Pagán. New York: Augustin Locust Valley, 1969-1970, English. Published in Artibus Asiae (Institute of Fine Arts, New York University). OCLC 563610846.: Vol 1: 1. Text. - 1969. - XVIII, 422 S, 1969.; Vol 2: 2, Catalogue of plates, indexes, 1970.; Vol 3: 3. Plates. - 1970. - 455 S, 1970.)
- Jao Tsung-I, Yamamoto Tatsurō (1975). 蒲甘国史事零拾 : Gordon H. Luce's Old Burma-Early Pagán 書後 (Gleanings of Historical Facts of the Pagan Kingdom: Postscript to Gordon H. Luce's Old Burma-Early Pagán) (PDF 1350KB). Newsletter of the Japan Society for Southeast Asian History (in Japanese). 1975 (5). Japan Society for Southeast Asian History: 3–13. doi:10.5512/sea.1975.3.

== Honorary positions ==
- Tōyō Bunko Modern China Research Committee
- 1953: Tōyō Bunko Councilor.
- 1966: First President of the Japan Society for Southeast Asian History. (Note: The Southern History Research Group, established by Yamamoto Tatsurō, became the foundational body of the Japan Society for Southeast Asian History founded in 1966. Renamed to the Japan Society for Southeast Asian Studies in 2006.)
- 1975: President of the International Council for Philosophy and Humanistic Studies (CIPSH).

== Awards ==
The following is based on "Yamamoto Tatsurō" in the 20th Century Japanese Biographical Dictionary.

- 1949: Mainichi Academic Encouragement Grant.
- 1952: Japan Academy Prize for Study of Annamese History.
- 1967: Member of the Japan Academy.
- 1986: Honored as a Person of Cultural Merit.
- 1998: Recipient of the Order of Culture.

== Festschriften ==
- 東洋史論叢 (Collection of Essays on Oriental History). Compiled by the Dr. Yamamoto 60th Birthday Commemorative Collection of Essays on Oriental History Compilation Committee. Yamakawa Shuppansha, 1972.
- 東南アジア・インドの社会と文化 (Society and Culture in Southeast Asia and India). Compiled by the Dr. Yamamoto Tatsurō 70th Birthday Commemorative Collection Editing Committee. Yamakawa Shuppansha, 1980.

== See also ==
- Nobuaki Makino
