= Ryōji Chūbachi =

Japanese businessman

- 中鉢 良治
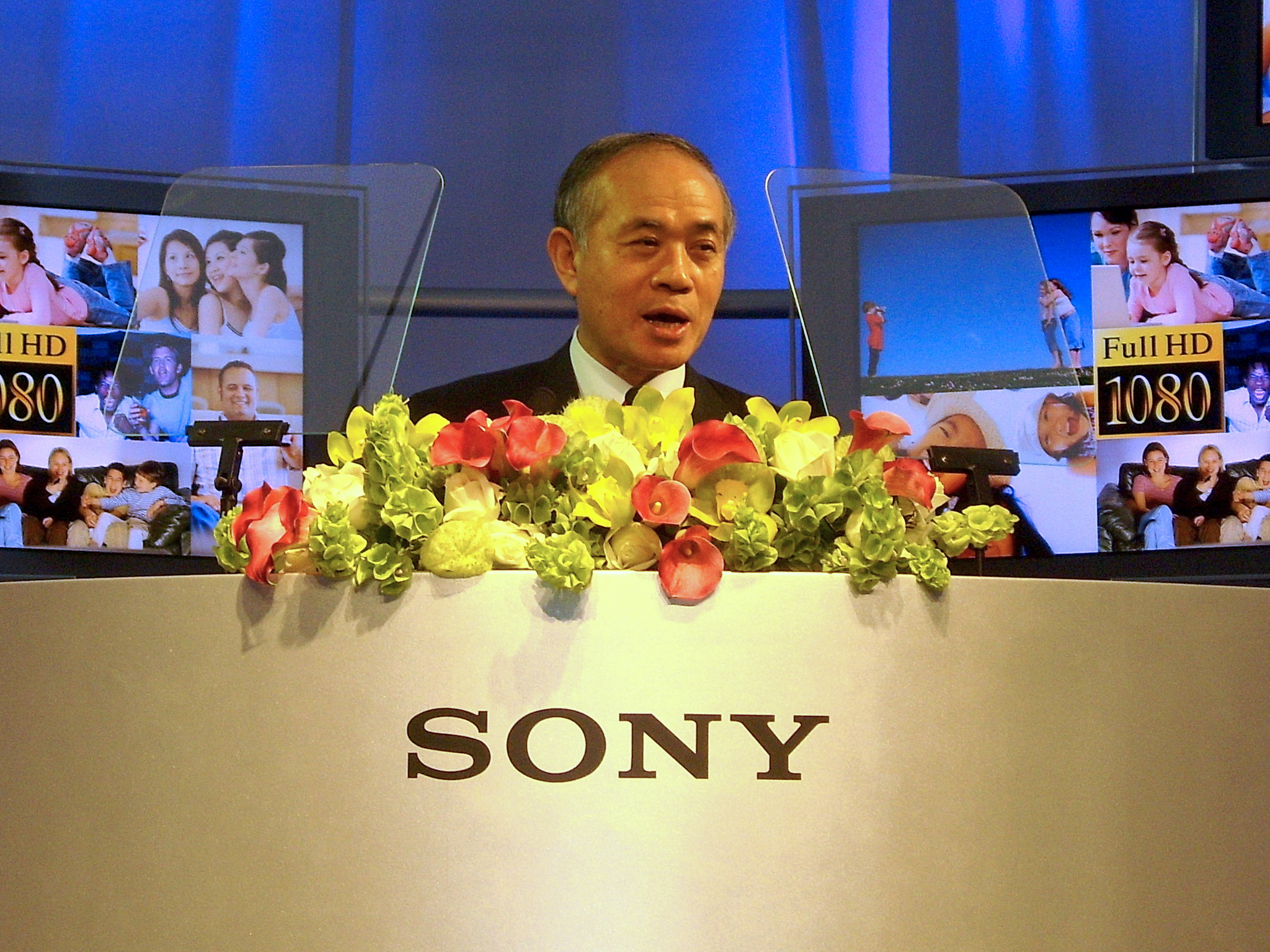
- SonyFair2008 Opening Ryoji Chubachi
- Born: September 4, 1947
- Occupation: Businessman
- Years active: 1977–present
- Employer(s): Sony Corporation (former), National Institute of Advanced Industrial Science and Technology (AIST) (current)
- Known for: Former President and Vice Chairman of Sony Corporation, President of AIST

Ryōji Chūbachi (中鉢 良治, Chūbachi Ryōji; born September 4, 1947) is a Japanese businessman, former vice chairman and president of Sony Corporation. He joined the company in 1977, later replacing Kunitake Andō to become president of the firm March 7, 2005. He was replaced as president by Howard Stringer on April 1, 2009. Chūbachi retired from Sony on March 31, 2013. Currently he is the president of the National Institute of Advanced Industrial Science and Technology (AIST), an independent administrative institution (agency) of the Ministry of Economy, Trade and Industry.

Chubachi had managed Sony's device and materials businesses and technology development. He was appointed president of Sony Corporation in 2005, with responsibility for the entire electronics business. Subsequently, in 2009, Chubashi was appointed to vice chairman.

In 2013, Chubachi retired from Sony and became president of the National Institute of Advanced Industrial Science and Technology (AIST), an independent administrative institution widely regarded as one of Japan's leading public research facilities in areas such as the environment, energy, life science, information technology and electronics.

Preceded by Kunitake Andō	President of Sony Corporation; 2005-2009	Succeeded by Howard Stringer
Preceded by Howard Stringer	Vice Chairman of Sony Corporation; 2009-2013	Succeeded by Masaru Kato
