= Kenichiro Yoshida =

Japanese businessman (born 1959)

- 吉田憲一郎
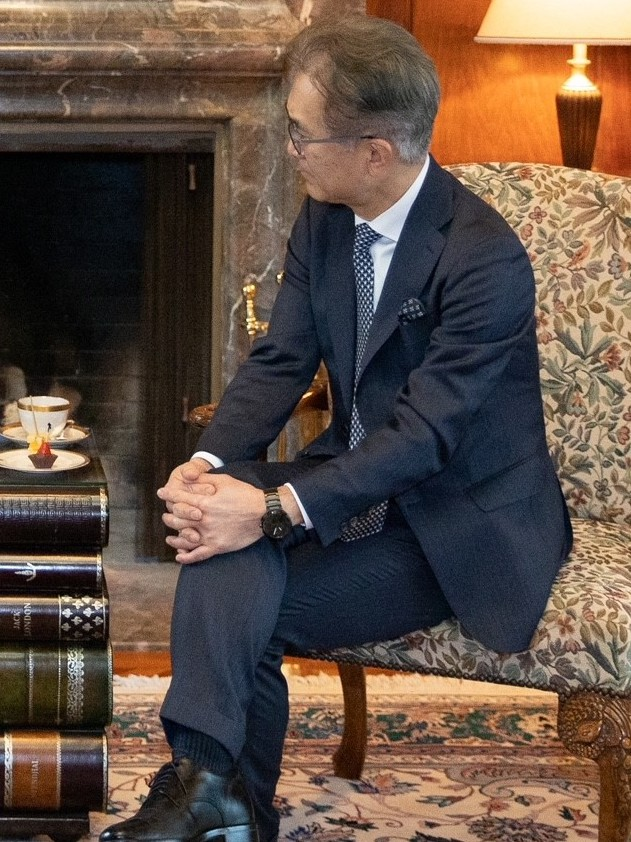
- Born: October 20, 1959 (age 67)
- Education: Tsurumaru High School
- Alma mater: University of Tokyo
- Occupations: Executive Chairman, Sony

Kenichiro Yoshida (born 20 October 1959) is a Japanese businessman currently serving as executive chairman of Sony. He previously served as president and CEO from April 2018 to April 2025, succeeding Kazuo Hirai, prior to which Yoshida was the company's chief financial officer.

== Career ==
Yoshida was born in Kumamoto in 1959, where his father, a court judge, was posted at the time. Immediately after graduating from the University of Tokyo with a B.A. in economics in 1983, Yoshida joined Sony, and worked across the company's subsidiaries in the US and Japan.

In the year 2000, he worked for Sony subsidiary So-net, which he took public in 2005. He rejoined Sony in 2013 as deputy chief financial officer and was promoted to chief financial officer the following year. In his role as CFO, he was credited with pushing the company through an extensive restructuring which turned around Sony's losses from consumer electronics.

== Personal life ==
Yoshida has an autistic son and makes it a point to spend at least one entire day a week with him. He has been active in raising awareness about autism.
