= JAIRO =

JAIRO (ジャイロ), which stands for Japanese Institutional Repositories Online, is a web-based search interface that provides aggregated open access to Japanese academic content, including journal articles, theses, research bulletins, and reports. It is administered by Japan's National Institute of Informatics (NII).

== History ==
A beta version of JAIRO was launched on October 22, 2008, and its official opening was on April 1 of the following year. JAIRO began as the JuNii+ service, which operated from May 2007 until March 2009.

As of September 30, 2015, nearly 1.6 million full-text documents were accessible through JAIRO.
