= Norio Ohga =

Japanese businessman (1930–2011)

- Born: January 29, 1930; Numazu, Shizuoka, Japan
- Died: April 23, 2011 (aged 81); Tokyo, Japan
- Education: Tokyo National University of Fine Arts and Music; Berlin University of the Arts
- Occupations: Businessperson; singer (baritone); conductor
- Organization(s): Sony; Tokyo Philharmonic Orchestra
- Known for: Sony
- Spouse: Midori Matsubara

Norio Ohga (大賀 典雄, Ōga Norio; January 29, 1930 – April 23, 2011), also spelled Norio Oga, was a Japanese businessperson who was the president and chairman of Sony Corporation. He is credited with spurring the development of the compact disc (CD) as a commercially viable audio format.

== Biography ==
=== Early career ===
Ohga was born in Numazu, Shizuoka. When he was a child, he suffered tuberculosis that kept him in bed for a long time during which an acquaintance taught him physics and music. As a young man, Ohga aspired to be a professional opera singer, and went on to read at the prestigious Tokyo National University of Fine Arts and Music, graduating in 1953.

His relationship with Sony began when he wrote a highly critical letter to Tokyo Tsushin Kogyo KK (also known as Totsuko and later as Sony), complaining about their tape recorder's many failings, which got him noticed by Masaru Ibuka, Akio Morita and other Totsuko executives. Because of his insight into music and technology, the company hired him as a part-time consultant.

Ohga went on to study music in Munich and Berlin, where he formed a friendship with the conductor Herbert von Karajan.

Ohga's knowledge of sound and electrical engineering continued to be an asset to Sony, which led to his appointments as executive director of Sony in 1964 at the age of 34 and president of CBS/Sony Records Inc. (currently Sony Music Entertainment Japan) in 1970, by the age of 40. These youthful appointments were unprecedented in the history of the Japanese company.

=== Later career ===
He was made the president of Sony in 1982, and the CEO of Sony in 1989. That same year, he purchased Columbia Pictures Entertainment (currently Sony Pictures Entertainment) from the Coca-Cola Company for $3.4 billion. A year earlier, Sony acquired the CBS Records Group (currently Sony Music Entertainment) from Columbia Broadcasting System. Ohga also played a key role in establishing Sony Computer Entertainment (currently Sony Interactive Entertainment) in 1993. He supported Ken Kutaragi to develop the PlayStation as a Sony-owned console.

In 1994, he succeeded co-founder Akio Morita as Sony chairman. The next year, he selected Nobuyuki Idei as the company's next president, a decision he later told author John Nathan appalled 99 out of 100 people at the company, and it led to a sweeping reorganisation of the company. Idei became co-CEO with Ohga in 1998, and sole CEO in 1999. In 2000, Ohga became semi-retired, staying chairman of the board while Idei became Executive chairman.

On November 7, 2001, Ohga collapsed onstage due to a cerebral hemorrhage while conducting an orchestra at the closing concert of the 4th Beijing Music Festival in Beijing. He later recovered his ability to speak and move after a three-month coma.

On his 73rd birthday in 2003, Ohga retired from the board and became Honorary chairman. He served as chairman of the Tokyo Philharmonic Orchestra.

Ohga died of multiple organ failure at a Tokyo hospital on April 23, 2011, at the age of 81.

== Awards ==
His international recognition included the Japanese Medal of Honor with Blue Ribbon (1988), Grand Cordon of the Order of the Sacred Treasure (2001) and France's Legion of Honour.

Business positions
Preceded by Kazuo Iwama	President of Sony Corporation; 1982–1989	Succeeded by Nobuyuki Idei
Preceded by	CEO of Sony Corporation; 1989–1999	Succeeded by Nobuyuki Idei
Preceded by Akio Morita	chairman of the board of Sony Corporation; 1994–2003	Succeeded by Nobuyuki Idei
Preceded by	Honorary Chairman of Sony Corporation; 2003–2011	Succeeded by
