= Nagano Prefectural College =

- 長野県短期大学
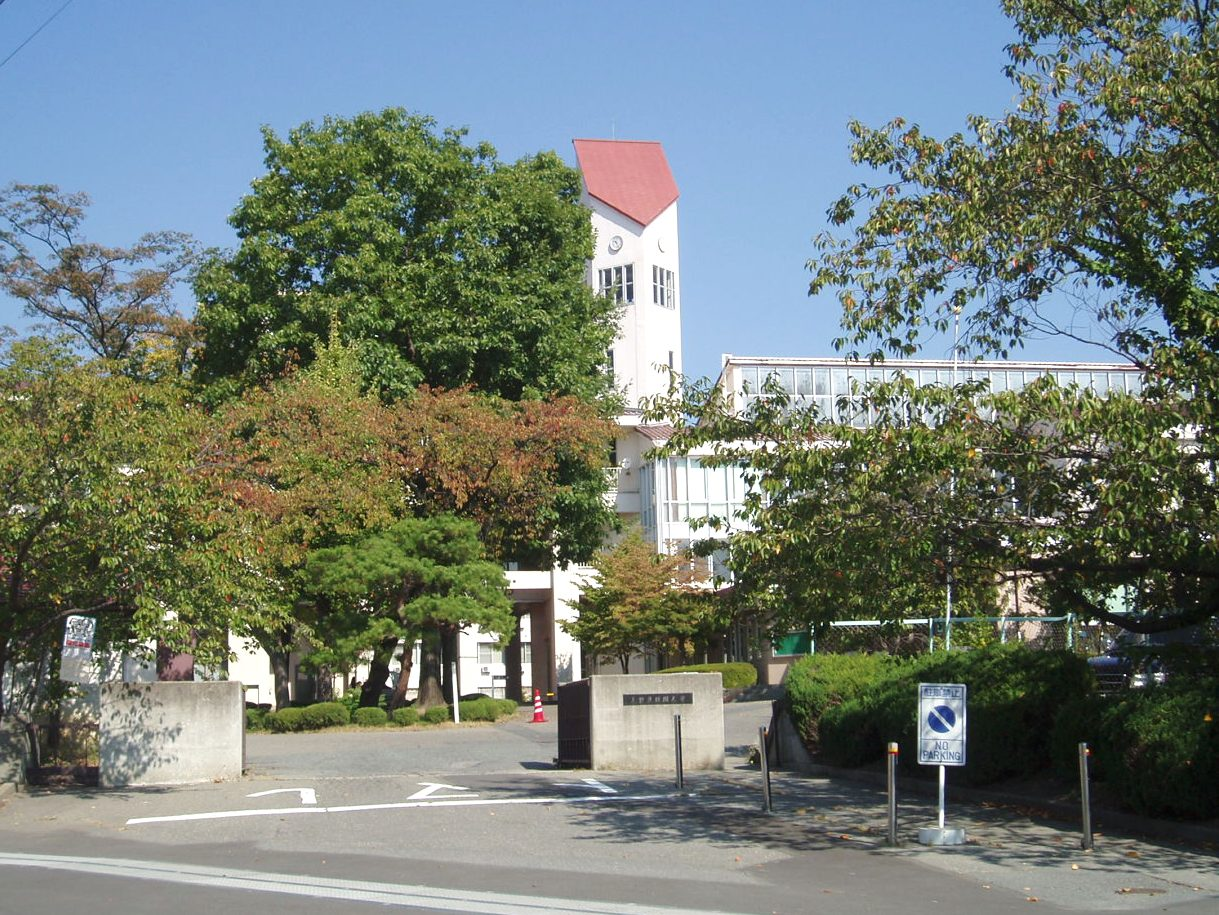
- Main entrance
- Type: Public
- Established: 1950
- Location: Nagano, Nagano, Japan; 36°39′56″N 138°12′02″E
- Nickname: Kentan
- Website: www.nagano-kentan.ac.jp

Nagano Prefectural College (長野県短期大学, Nagano-ken Tanki Daigaku) was a junior college in Nagano, Nagano, Japan.

The junior college was founded in 1950 by Nagano Prefecture. The predecessor of the school was founded in 1929. It became coeducational in 2004. It became a 4-year university in April 2018 called The University of Nagano.
