= Kaz Hirai =

Japanese businessman (born 1960)

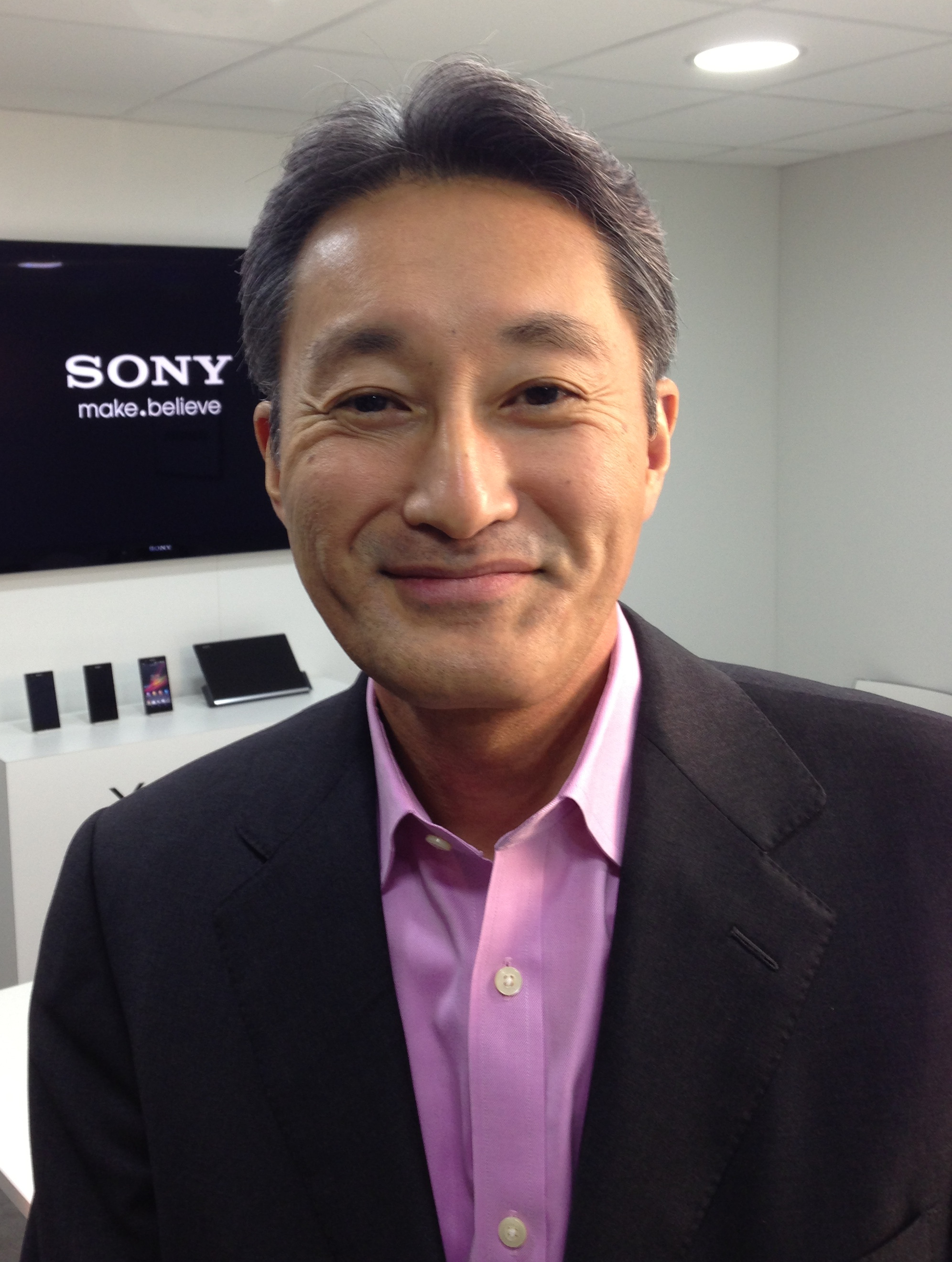
- Hirai at the Mobile World Congress 2013 in Barcelona
- Born: December 22, 1960 (age 65); Tokyo, Japan
- Education: International Christian University

Kazuo "Kaz" Hirai (平井 一夫, Hirai Kazuo; born December 22, 1960) is a Japanese businessman who has served in various positions at Sony Corporation beginning in 1984, including as president and CEO from April 2012 to April 2018 and as chairman from April 2018 to June 2019.

Hirai had mostly been involved in Sony's entertainment businesses. He served as a board member of Sony Computer Entertainment and was noted by Entertainment Weekly in 2006 as one of the most powerful executives in the entertainment industry. He led this division between 2007 and 2012 succeeding Ken Kutaragi, before becoming CEO of the Sony group overall succeeding Howard Stringer. Through his tenure as CEO, Sony experienced a resurgence back to profitability and a shift towards entertainment and intellectual property. In 2018, Hirai stepped down as president and CEO to become chairman of Sony Corporation until he retired in June 2019, continuing as a senior adviser to the company until his full retirement in June 2024.

== Early life ==
Kazuo Hirai was born on December 22, 1960, in Tokyo, where he attended the American School in Japan. Between 1973 and 1976, Hirai attended Valley Park Middle School in Toronto, Canada. The son of a wealthy banker, Hirai often traveled with his father across the world to California, New York, Canada and around Japan—a trait which Hirai noted to be a major factor in his later multi-continental business success. He grew up in Tokyo, Toronto, and LeFrak City, Queens.

It was his interest in games that later brought him into the entertainment business. After graduating from the International Christian University in August 1984 with a Bachelor of Liberal Arts degree, Hirai was hired at CBS/Sony Inc. (now Sony Music Entertainment (Japan) Inc.), where he was involved in marketing international music within Japan. He eventually became head of Sony Computer Entertainment Japan's international business affairs office in New York.

== Career ==
=== CBS/Sony Inc. ===
Kazuo Hirai began his career with Sony Music Entertainment Japan in 1984, starting out in CBS/Sony Inc.'s (now Sony Music Entertainment Japan) marketing department. Afterwards, he became the head of Sony's international business affairs department. He then moved to Sony Music Japan's New York office, leading the marketing of Sony Music Japan artists in the U.S.

=== Sony Computer Entertainment ===
In August 1995, Hirai joined Sony's computer and video game division, Sony Computer Entertainment America. He was promoted to executive vice president-chief operations officer in July 1996. One year later, in 1997, Hirai was credited on his first completed video game. With the release of the PlayStation 2 in 2000, Kazuo continued his success, utilizing second-party video game franchises such as Jak and Daxter, Ratchet & Clank, Sly Cooper and SOCOM series of games. Under his leadership, SCEA continually managed to retain high profits throughout the sixth-generation era.

On July 3, 2006, Sony Computer Entertainment announced that Hirai had been made a vice president of its corporate executive group. On November 30, 2006, just under two weeks after the launch of PlayStation 3, Hirai replaced Ken Kutaragi as president of Sony Computer Entertainment. While maintaining his positions at SCEA, Hirai also became chief operating officer of SCEI. Kutaragi himself was promoted to chairman of SCEI, and remained chief executive officer of the group. On April 26, 2007, it was announced that Hirai will be promoted to president and group CEO of SCEI, replacing Ken Kutaragi who would retire and instead take up the role of honorary chairman.

On April 1, 2009, Sony's electronics and game businesses were merged and reconfigured as two major groups: the Consumer Products & Devices Group (CPDG) and the Networked Products & Services Group (NPSG). Hirai was appointed as corporate executive officer and executive vice president of Sony Corporation, concurrently serving as president of the NPSG. He has overseen all development, production and marketing activities at the NPSG, comprising Sony's game (i.e. SCEI & Sony Online Entertainment), personal computer (VAIO), mobile devices (including Walkman and Xperia) and network service (Sony Entertainment Network, including online distributions of music, video, games, eBooks, etc.) businesses and new business incubation projects. Hirai became chairman of Sony Computer Entertainment on September 1, 2011, and was replaced by Andrew House as president and group CEO. He retired as chairman of SCEI on June 25, 2012, but remains on the board of directors.

=== Sony Corporation ===
On April 1, 2011, Hirai was promoted to representative corporate executive officer and executive deputy president of Sony Corporation. He oversaw the Consumer Products & Services Group. Hirai was speculated to become the successor to Howard Stringer, the current sitting president and CEO of Sony Corporation, who was then expected to step down in 2013.

On February 1, 2012, Sony announced that Hirai has been appointed as president and chief executive officer, effective April 1, 2012. He was appointed to the board at the annual shareholders meeting on June 27, 2012.

On February 2, 2018, Sony announced that Hirai will be stepping down as president and CEO, effective April 1, 2018, to be replaced by CFO Kenichiro Yoshida. Hirai remained as the company's chairman and served on the board of directors to help the company transition to leadership under Yoshida.

Hirai announced on March 28, 2019, that he would be retiring as chairman of Sony on June 18, 2019, though he will continue to act as a senior advisor at Sony's request. Hirai stated he was confident that Yoshida would be able to continue the leadership of Sony on his own. Following his retirement, Hirai remained as a senior advisor to the company.

== Nickname ==
His real name is "Kazuo (一夫)", but he is commonly known by the shortened version, "Kaz". In Japan, he is also affectionately called "Ridge Hirai (リッジ平井)". This nickname comes from Sony's press conference at E3 2006, where, during a presentation showing PlayStation games running on the PlayStation Portable, he passionately shouted "Riiiiidge Racer!" while demonstrating the game. He is aware of this nickname and even mentions it in his autobiography.

Business positions
Preceded by Sir Howard Stringer	Chairman of Sony Corporation; 2018–2019	Succeeded by Kenichiro Yoshida
Preceded by Sir Howard Stringer	President and CEO of Sony Corporation; 2012–2018	Succeeded by Kenichiro Yoshida
