= J-STAGE =

Electronic journal platform

J-STAGE (Japan Science Technology Information Aggregator, Electronic)
- The logo of J-STAGE
- Producer: Japan Science and Technology Agency (JST) (Japan)
- History: 1998–present
- Languages: Japanese

Access
- Cost: Basically free

Coverage
- Format coverage: Journal articles and books
- Geospatial coverage: Japan

Links
- Website: www.jstage.jst.go.jp

J-STAGE (Japan Science Technology Information Aggregator, Electronic) is an electronic journal platform for Japanese academic journals.

It supports the submission of manuscripts, peer‐reviewing, page‐layouting and dissemination of electronic journals published in Japan. The site provides free access to full text electronic journals, proceedings, and reports from various Japanese scientific societies.

== Journal@rchive ==

J-STAGE includes the Journal@rchive (ja), an open access digital archive of Japanese journals, established in 2005 by the Government of Japan. By April 2009, some 540 academic organizations made use of the facility. As of February 2012, 1.68 million articles were available for download. To build the archive, in 2006 a robotic book scanner was introduced that could scan 1,200 pages per hour.

== See also ==
- CiNii
- National Institute for Informatics
