= Nobuyuki Idei =

Japanese businessman (1937–2022)

Noboyuki Idei
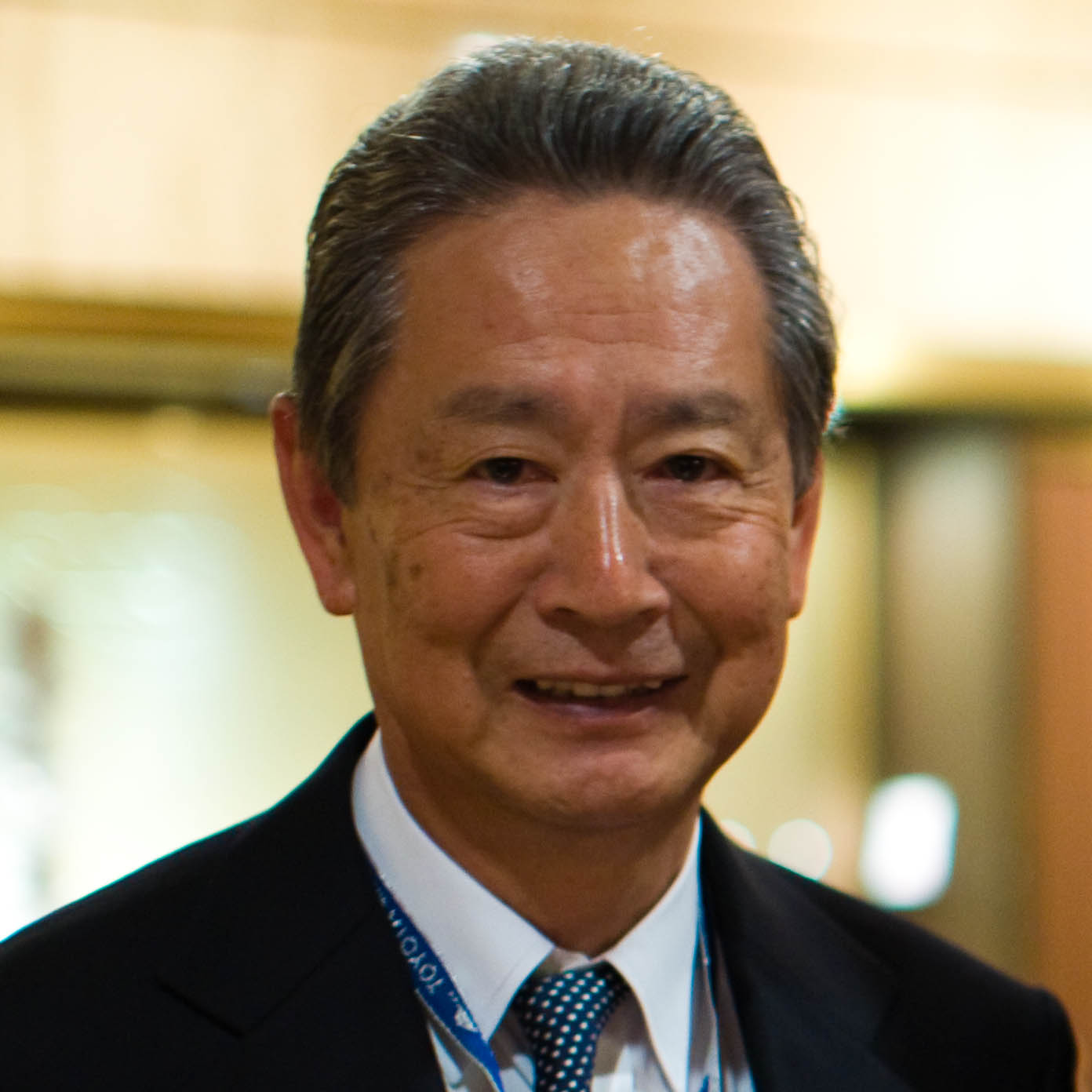
- Idei in 2008
- Born: 22 November 1937; Tokyo, Japan
- Died: 2 June 2022 (aged 84)
- Occupation(s): Business executive; former CEO of Sony corporation
- Children: 1

Nobuyuki Idei (出井 伸之, Idei Nobuyuki; 22 November 1937 – 2 June 2022) was a Japanese businessman. He was chairman and group chief executive officer of Sony Corporation until 7 March 2005. He was a director of General Motors, Baidu, Yoshimoto Kogyo and Nestlé.

== Early life ==
Idei was born in Tokyo on 22 November 1937. His father was a professor of economics at Waseda University, a private university in Tokyo.

== Career ==
Idei joined Sony Corporation when he graduated from Waseda University. He started as a trainee working with the co-founders Akio Morita and Masaru Ibuka and rose through the ranks as a marketing specialist. He left Sony and enrolled in a PhD program at the Graduate Institute of International Studies in Geneva, but he did not obtain the degree. Sony re-hired him and he was moved to Europe to manage Sony's businesses in the continent.

After a stroke sidelined former chairman Akio Morita, Sony CEO and new chairman Norio Ohga selected Idei to be the next president, a choice that raised eyebrows at Sony. His sweeping reorganizations of the company included trimming the board of directors from 38 members dominated by company management to 10 with a substantial presence of outsiders. Already perceived as the company's driving force, Idei was formally named co-CEO in 1998 and sole CEO in 1999. In 2000, while Ohga remained chairman of the board, Idei became executive chairman and Kunitake Andō became president.

In 2003, on Ohga's retirement, Idei became the sole chairman, and the title of chief executive officer was altered to group chief executive officer. On 7 March 2005, it was announced that Idei would be succeeded on 22 June by Sir Howard Stringer.

In 2006, Idei joined the board leading Accenture. On 28 September 2011, Idei joined the board of directors of Lenovo.

Idei founded his own consulting firm Quantum Leaps Corporation on his retirement from Sony. He was also on the board of companies including General Motors and Baidu.

On 5 February 2015, Idei retired from Accenture's board of directors.

== Personal life ==
Idei was married and had a daughter. He died on 2 June 2022 from liver failure. He was aged 84.

Business positions
Preceded by Norio Ohga	President of Sony Corporation; 1989–2000	Succeeded by Kunitake Andō
Preceded by Norio Ohga	CEO of Sony Corporation; 1999–2005	Succeeded by Sir Howard Stringer
Preceded by Norio Ohga	Chairman of Sony Corporation; 2003–2005	Succeeded by Sir Howard Stringer
