= Howard Stringer =

Welsh businessman (born 1942)

Sir Howard Stringer
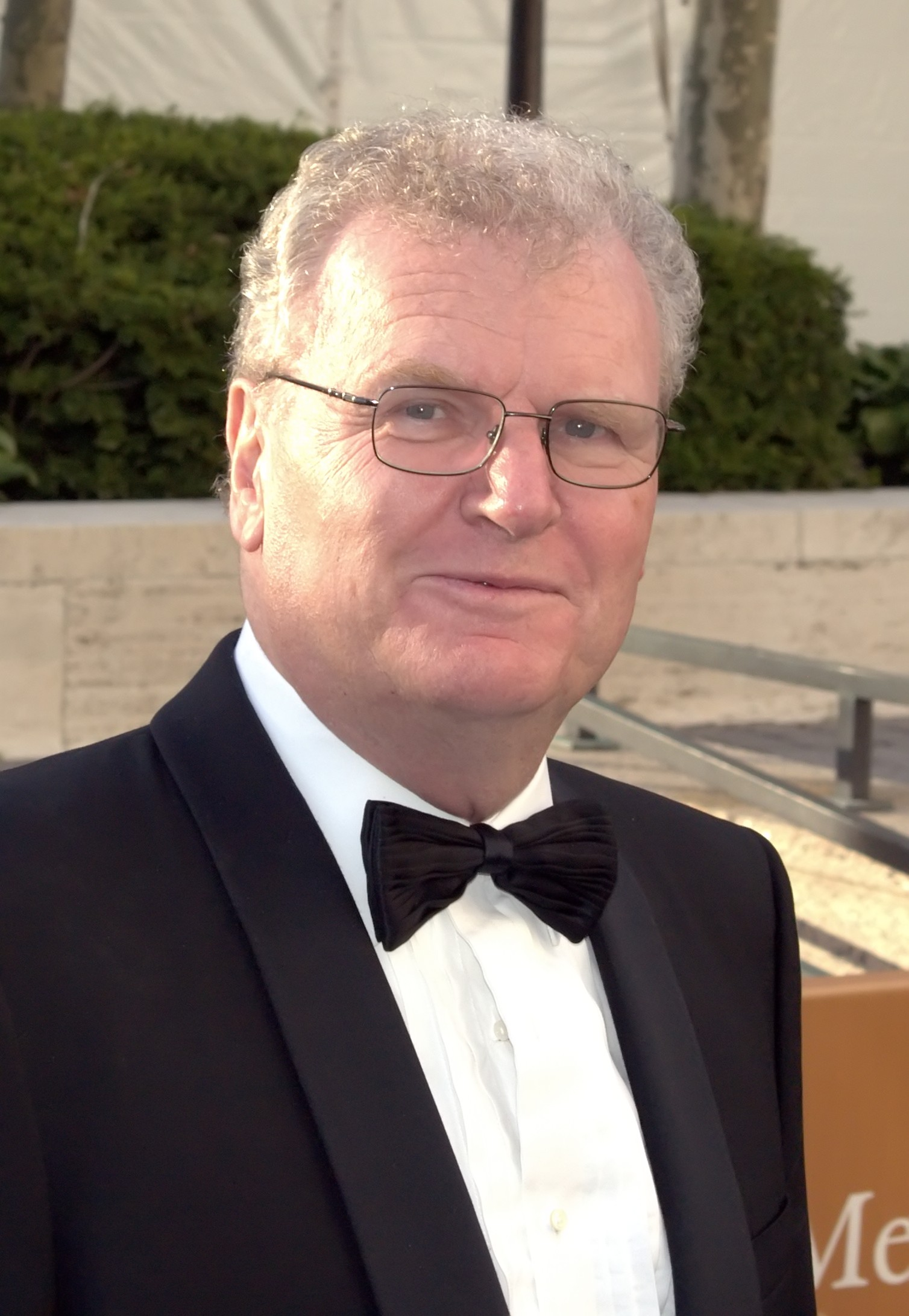
- Stringer at opening night of the 2009 Metropolitan Opera
- Born: 19 February 1942 (age 84); Cardiff, Wales, United Kingdom
- Education: University of Oxford
- Alma mater: Merton College, Oxford; Royal Welsh College of Music & Drama
- Occupation: Non-executive director of the BBC
- Spouse: Jennifer A. Kinmond Patterson
- Family: Rob Stringer (brother)
- Military career
- Allegiance: United States of America
- Branch: United States Army
- Service years: 1965–1967
- Conflicts: Vietnam War

Sir Howard Stringer (born 19 February 1942) is a Welsh-American businessman. He had a 30-year career at CBS, culminating in him serving as the president of CBS News from 1986 to 1988, then president of CBS from 1988 to 1995. He served as chairman of the board, chairman, president and CEO of Sony Corporation from 2005 to 2012. He is also the head of the board of trustees of the American Film Institute and now serves as a non-executive director of the BBC. He was knighted in 1999.

== Early life and education ==
Stringer was born in Cardiff, Wales, the son of Marjorie Mary (née Pook), a Welsh schoolteacher, and Harry Stringer, a sergeant in the Royal Air Force.

His younger brother, Rob Stringer, was president of Sony Music Label Group.

Stringer attended 11 secondary schools by the time he was 16, including Oundle School in Northamptonshire. He received a Master of Arts from the University of Oxford in Modern History.

== Career ==
Stringer moved to the United States in 1965. After working at CBS's flagship station WCBS-TV for six weeks, he was drafted into the United States Army, and served as a military policeman in Saigon for ten months in the Vietnam War. He did not serve in combat, but was awarded the Army Commendation Medal for meritorious achievement.

Stringer returned to CBS, where he had a 30-year career. He started in a series of lowly jobs, including answering backstage phones for The Ed Sullivan Show. In 1976, he became executive producer of the documentary series CBS Reports. Then, from 1981 to 1984, he was executive producer of the CBS Evening News with Dan Rather. In 1986, he became president of CBS News as a whole. He then served as president of CBS from 1988 to 1995, where he was responsible for all the broadcast activities of its entertainment, news, sports, radio and television stations. During Stringer's tenure, CBS gained the services of David Letterman with his Late Show but also lost National Football League rights to the upstart Fox Broadcasting Company, leading several CBS affiliates to align with the latter.

=== Tele-TV ===
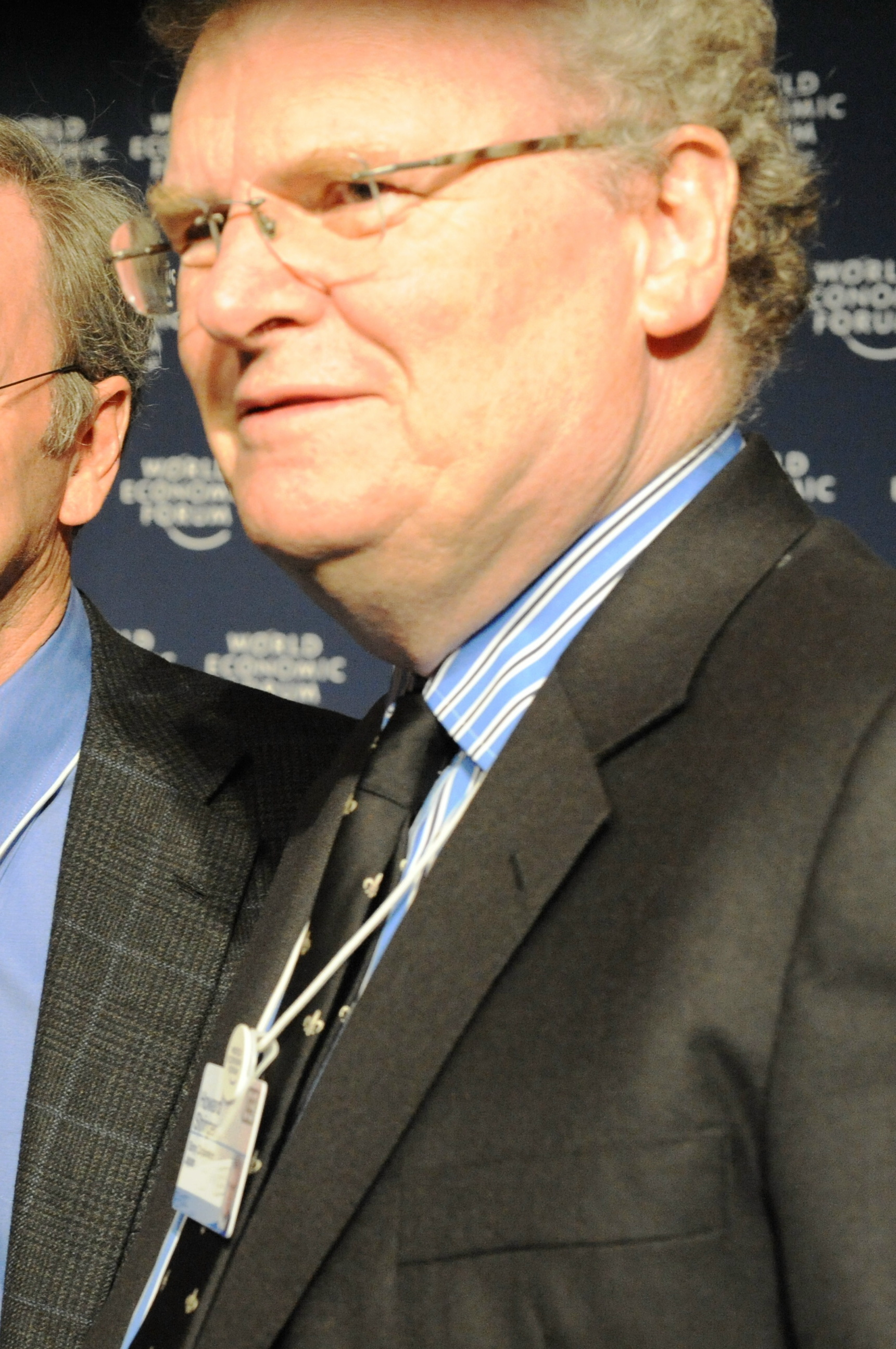
Howard Stringer in 2008

Stringer left CBS in 1995 to become CEO of Tele-TV, a newly created media and technology company formed by US telecoms Bell Atlantic, NYNEX and Pacific Telesis, as well as Creative Artists Agency. Tele-TV represented an early attempt at a video on demand service, which streamed content over the phone network. The company was unsuccessful, and shut down most of its operations in early 1997, after having spent roughly $500 million. Stringer left at that time.

=== Sony ===
Stringer began work at Sony in May 1997 as president of its US operational unit (Sony Corporation of America). He was made a Sony group executive officer in May 1998.

From 22 June 2005, Stringer served as Chairman of Sony, overseeing businesses such as Sony Computer Entertainment, Sony Music Entertainment, Sony Electronics, Sony Pictures Entertainment and Sony Financial Holdings, succeeding Nobuyuki Idei. On 1 April 2009, he became president of Sony Corporation and ousted Ryoji Chubachi in what was seen as prelude to broader corporate restructuring. Stringer also served as executive chairman and chief executive officer of Sony Corporation of America, and as president of Sony Broadband Entertainment Corporation since March 2000.

Stringer was promoted to the company's top position as the corporation overall was having trouble with losses and was facing increasing competition from rivals such as Samsung, Sharp, Apple Inc. and Panasonic. With his experience primarily in the media industry, Stringer was responsible for the media business of Sony in the U.S. by overseeing the release of the Spider-Man film series, among others.

As CEO, Stringer's initial focus was on streamlining Sony's electronics business, such as through its Bravia TV joint venture with Samsung. Stringer was instrumental in arranging Sony's investment in Spotify, which earned Sony a profit of nearly $1 billion upon Sony's partial exit in 2018. Nonetheless, Sony's share price fell by 60 per cent from when Stringer assumed the role of group chairman until his resignation as CEO was announced in 2012, due in part to exchange rates and the effects of the 2011 Tohoku earthquake.

On 1 February 2012, Sony announced that Stringer would step down as president and CEO, effective 1 April to be replaced by Kazuo Hirai, executive deputy president and chairman of Sony Computer Entertainment. Stringer relinquished his title of chairman of Sony and became chairman of the board of Sony in June ('Chairman of Sony' and 'Chairman of the Board of Directors' are separate positions at Sony). In June 2013, Stringer retired as chairman of the board of Sony.

While serving as the chief of Sony in Tokyo, Stringer maintained a home in New York while his family lived in England.

In a 2014 speech, Stringer expressed his frustrations with his time at Sony, saying, "Running a big company is like running a cemetery: there are thousands of people beneath you, but no one is listening. It was a bit like that at Sony." He specifically lamented that Sony had a "not invented here" mentality that did not suit an increasingly digital world, and which Stringer was unable to shake off.

== Awards and honours ==
Stringer has received the following awards and honours:

- U.S. Army Commendation Medal for meritorious achievement during the Vietnam War
- Radio and Television News Directors Foundation's First Amendment Leadership Award, 1996
- Broadcasting & Cable Hall of Fame, 1996
- UJA-Federation of New York's Steven J. Ross Humanitarian Award, May 1999
- Royal Television Society Welsh Hall of Fame, November 1999
- Knight Bachelor, from Her Majesty Queen Elizabeth II, December 1999
- Museum of Television and Radio Visionary Award for Innovative Leadership in Media and Entertainment, February 2007
- Merton College, Oxford honorary fellowship, 2000
- Royal Welsh College of Music & Drama honorary fellowship, 2001

He has also been honoured by Lincoln Center, Big Brothers Big Sisters, The New York Hall of Science and The American Theatre Wing, and has received Honorary Doctorates from the University of Glamorgan in Wales and University of the Arts London.

Coat of arms of Howard Stringer

Motto

== Personal life ==
In July 1978, Stringer married Jennifer A. Kinmond Patterson. They have two children.

He became a naturalised American citizen in 1985.

He was knighted by Queen Elizabeth II on 31 December 1999.

== In popular culture ==
Stringer was portrayed by Peter Jurasik in the 1996 HBO film The Late Shift, about the conflict between Jay Leno and David Letterman during Stringer's tenure at CBS in the early 1990s.

He appeared on the BBC radio programme Desert Island Discs in 2013.

Business positions
Preceded by Nobuyuki Idei	Chairman of Sony Corporation; 2005–2012	Succeeded by Kaz Hirai
Preceded by Ryoji Chubachi	President of Sony Corporation; 2009 – March 2012	Succeeded by Kaz Hirai
Preceded by Nobuyuki Idei	CEO of Sony Corporation; 2005 – March 2012	Succeeded by Kaz Hirai
Preceded by Yotaro Kobayashi	Chairman of the Board of Sony Corporation; 27 June 2012 – 20 June 2013	Succeeded by Osamu Nagayama
Preceded by	CEO of Sony Corporation of America; 1998 – June 2012	Succeeded by Michael Lynton
