= Kunitake Andō =

Former president of Sony Corporation

- Born: January 1, 1942 (age 84)
- Occupations: Honorable Chairman, BJIT Group; President & COO, Sony Corporation (2000-2005)

Kunitake Andō (安藤 国威, Andō Kunitake; born January 1, 1942) is a Japanese businessman. As of 2001, he serves as the honorable chairman of BJIT Group and served as the president & COO of Sony Corporation from 2000 to 2005. Andō is from Aichi Prefecture and graduated from University of Tokyo.

Having been a Sony employee since 1969, he first served on the board from 1994 to 1997, when he was removed as part of the massive reduction in the size of the board initiated by Sony president Nobuyuki Idei. He did not return to the board until he succeeded Idei as president, even though he was named Executive Deputy President and Chief Operating Officer in April, 2000. His secondary title was altered to Group Chief Operating Officer in 2003 and to Global Hub President in 2004. On March 7, 2005, it was announced that he would step down to become an adviser, with Ryōji Chūbachi succeeding him as president.

He also served as Chairman of The University of Nagano in Nagano, Japan.

Preceded by Nobuyuki Idei	President of Sony Corporation; 2000-2005	Succeeded by Ryōji Chūbachi
