= National Institute of Informatics =

Japanese research institute

Coordinates: 35°41′32.86″N 139°45′29.17″E

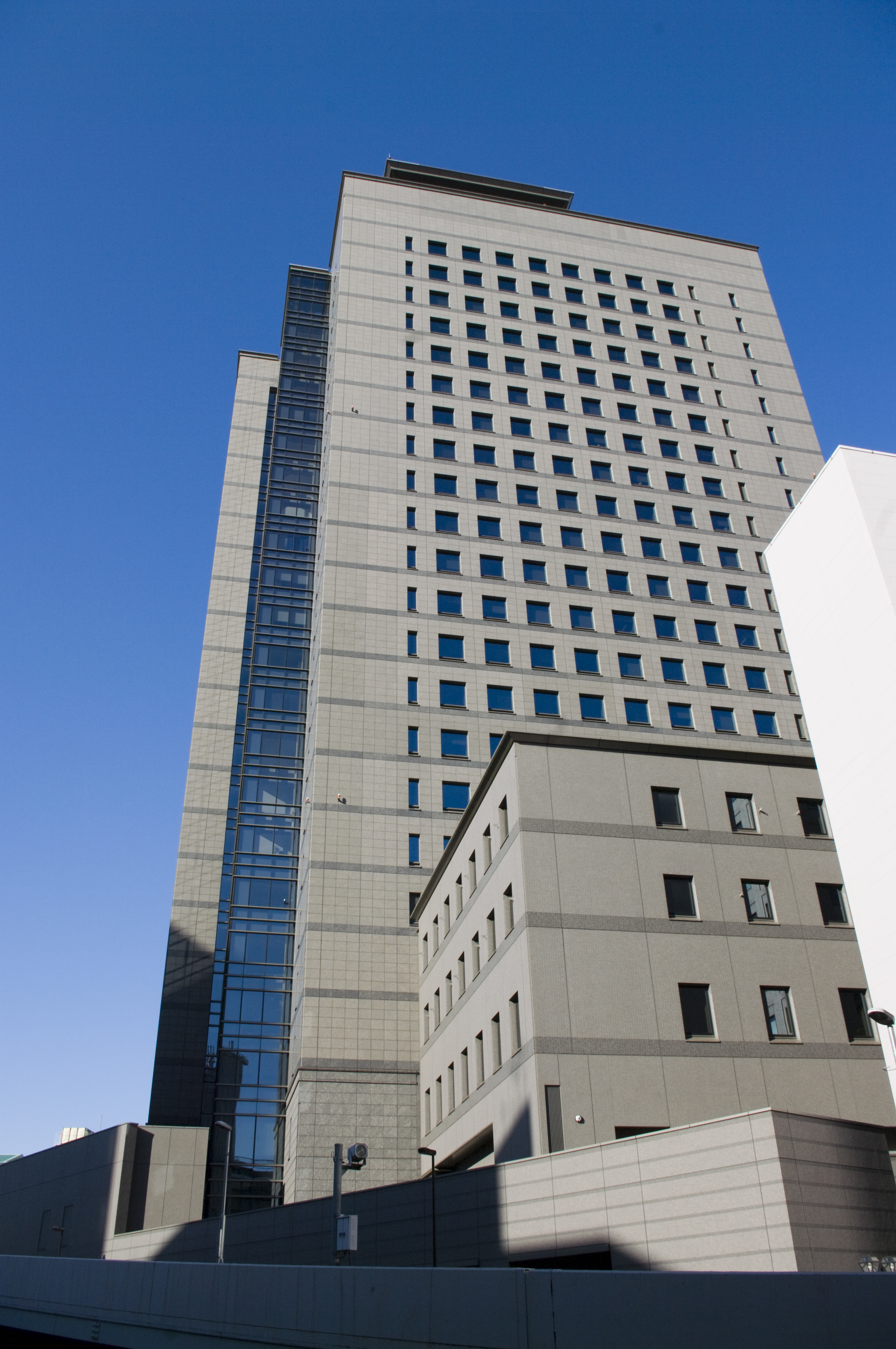
- National Institute of Informatics inside National Center of Sciences Building in Hitotsubashi, Chiyoda-ku, Tokyo.
- Industry: informatics
- Founded: April 2000; 25 years ago Chiyoda, Tokyo, Japan
- Headquarters: Japan
- Key people: KUROHASHI, Sadao (Director General)
- Website: www.nii.ac.jp/en/

The National Institute of Informatics (国立情報学研究所, Kokuritsu Jōhōgaku Kenkyūjo; NII) is a Japanese research institute located in Chiyoda, Tokyo, Japan. NII was established in April 2000 for the purpose of advancing the study of informatics. This institute also works on creating systems to facilitate the spread of scientific information to the general public. It oversees and maintains a large, searchable information database on a variety of scientific and non-scientific topics called Webcat. NII is the only comprehensive research institute in informatics in Japan. It is a major part of the Graduate University for Advanced Studies, SOKENDAI, and since 2002 has offered a Ph.D. program in informatics.

== History ==
NII had its inception in a proposition from the Ministry of Education, Science, Sports, and Culture presented to the Science Council in October 1973, entitled "Improved Circulation System for Academic Information." In 1976 the Research Center for Library and Information Science was established at the University of Tokyo, paving the way for the institute that was to become the National Institute of Informatics. In 1983 the research center was reorganized and transformed into the Center for Bibliographic Information, but continued to operate under the aegis of the University of Tokyo. This center was then further restructured in 1986 and renamed the National Center for Science Information Systems (NACSIS).

The NACSIS was the first incarnation of the institute to be independent of the University of Tokyo. The institute developed and grew in accordance with advances in computer and Internet technology, eventually outgrowing the initial vision behind the National Center for Science Information Systems. In April 2000 this center was overhauled and reformed as the National Institute of Informatics. NII is located in the Chiyoda district of Tokyo. It is a principal part of the National Center of Sciences building, along with the Hitotsubashi University Graduate School of International Corporate Strategy, and the Center for University Finance.

== Research ==
The institute focuses on scientific research regarding information-gathering techniques and systems for information management in all scholarly disciplines. NII attempts to balance theoretical and practical research approaches, aiming to create new techniques for searching and organizing extremely high-volume databases using new opportunities presented by advancements in high-speed network capabilities. NII conducts research in partnership with numerous universities and other research institutions, both public and private.

The institute's primary goal is enhancing the knowledge of informatics in Japan, but it also works closely with international and exchange researchers and institutes for the advancement of multiple goals, including the development of international standards in informatics. NII hosts various research exchange programs for visiting students, research interns, postdocs, and visiting professors such as the Japanese JSPS and Germany DAAD programs. NII organizes a popular international internship that invites and funds students around the world to come to Japan and conduct research under guidance of professors at NII for up to 6 months twice a year.

In addition to its research functions, NII has a postgraduate education function since 2002 as the Department of Informatics, School of Multidisciplinary Sciences, Graduate University for Advanced Studies, SOKENDAI.

== Webcat ==
Webcat and Webcat Plus are advanced search databases offered and maintained as a part of NII's GeNii (Global Environment for Networked Intellectual Information) division. GeNii was created as means of integrating and unifying the content of several information retrieval and electronic library services overseen by NII, the primary result of which has been the Webcat search systems. Webcat, and its simultaneously maintained successor, Webcat Plus, are book and journal search systems that supply holdings information for materials held in research institutes and university library collections throughout Japan. Webcat Plus currently has information on over twelve million titles, and both systems can be searched in English and Japanese. GeNii's further plans for the Webcat system include integrating the entire holdings of the National Diet Library into the searchable database. No information is currently available on the scheduled completion date for this project.

== See also ==
- CiNii
- J-STAGE
- SINET
