= List of wars: 1800–1899 =

This article provides a list of wars occurring between 1800 and 1899. Conflicts of this era include the Napoleonic Wars in Europe, the American Civil War in North America, the Taiping Rebellion in Asia, the Paraguayan War in South America, the Zulu War in Africa, and the Australian frontier wars in Oceania.

== 1800–1809 ==
Start	Finish	Name of conflict	Belligerents	
Start	Finish	Name of conflict	Victorious party (if applicable)	Defeated party (if applicable)
1800	1865	Temne War	British Empire; Susu Tribes	Kingdom of Koya
1801	1805	Tripolitan War	United States; Sweden (until 1802); Sicily	Tripolitania; Morocco (1802)
1801	1801	War of the Oranges; Part of the War of the Second Coalition	France Spain	Portugal
1802	1804	Fourth quarter of the Haitian Revolution	Haiti	France
1802	1802	Sack of Karbala	Diriyah	Ottoman Empire
1802	1802	Stecklikrieg	Helvetic Republic	Federalist rebels
1802	1810	Tedbury's War	British Empire	Aboriginal Australians
1803	1803	Souliote War	Ottoman Empire	Souliotes
1803	1803	Irish Rebellion of 1803	British Empire	Society of United Irishmen
1803	1805	Second Anglo-Maratha War	British East India Company	Maratha Empire
1803	1805	Burmese–Siamese War (1803–05)	Konbaung dynasty	Siam
1803	1805	First Kandyan War	British Empire	Kingdom of Kandy
1803	1815	Napoleonic Wars	Coalition forces: (Austrian Empire) Austria (Note: 1805, 1809, 1813–1815) (Note: The term "Austrian Empire" came into use after Napoleon crowned himself Emperor of the French in 1804, whereby Francis II, Holy Roman Emperor took the title Emperor of Austria (Kaiser von Österreich) in response. The Holy Roman Empire was dissolved in 1806, and consequently "Emperor of Austria" became Francis' primary title. For this reason, "Austrian Empire" is often used instead of "Holy Roman Empire" for brevity's sake when speaking of the Napoleonic Wars, even though the two entities are not synonymous.) (Note: Both Austria and Prussia briefly became allies of France and contributed forces to the French Invasion of Russia in 1812.); (Kingdom of Prussia) Prussia (Note: 1806–1807, 1813–1815); (Russian Empire) Russia (Note: 1804–1807, 1812–1815) (Note: Russia became an ally of France following the Treaty of Tilsit in 1807. The alliance broke down in 1810, which led to the French invasion in 1812. During that time Russia waged war against Sweden (1808–1809) and the Ottoman Empire (1806–1812), and nominally against Britain (1807–1812).); (United Kingdom of Great Britain and Ireland) United Kingdom; (Grand Duchy of Baden) Baden; Bavaria (Note: 1813–1815); (Duchy of Brunswick) Brunswick (Note: 1815)); (Kingdom of France) French royalists; (Province of Hanover) Hanover (Note: Hanover was in a personal union with Great Britain); (Kingdom of Hungary (1526–1867)) Hungary (Note: 1809) (Note: The Kingdom of Hungary participated in the war with separate Hungarian regiments in the Imperial and Royal Army, and also by a traditional army ("insurrectio"). The Hungarian Diet voted to join in war and agreed to pay one third of the war expenses.); Liechtenstein; Montenegro (Note: 1806–1807, 1813–1814); Nassau; (United Kingdom of the Netherlands) Netherlands; Ottoman Empire (Note: 1807–1812) (Note: The Ottoman Empire fought against Napoleon in the French Campaign in Egypt and Syria as part of the French Revolutionary Wars. During the Napoleonic era of 1803 to 1815, the Empire participated in two wars against the Allies: against Britain in the Anglo-Turkish War (1807–1809) and against Russia in the Russo-Turkish War (1806–1812). Russia was allied with Napoleon 1807–1810.); Papal States; Persia (Note: The Qajar dynasty fought against Russia from 1804 to 1813; the Russians were allied with Napoleon 1807–1812.); Portugal (Note: 1800–1807, 1809–1815); Sardinia (Note: 1802, 1808–1815)); (Kingdom of Saxony) Saxony; (Kingdom of Sicily) Sicily (Note: 1806–1815) (Note: Sicily remained in personal union with Naples until Naples became a French client-republic following the Battle of Campo Tenese in 1806.); Spain (Note: 1808–1815) (Note: Spain was an ally of France until a stealthy French invasion in 1808, then fought France in the Peninsular War.); Sweden (Note: 1804–1809, 1812–1815) (Note: Nominally, Sweden declared war against Great Britain after its defeat by Russia in the Finnish War (1808–1809).); Switzerland; Tuscany; Württemberg	France and allies: (French First Republic) French Republic (until 1804) (First French Empire) French Empire (from 1804) French clients: Bonapartist Spain; Confederation of the Rhine (Note: 1808–1813) (Note: Sixteen of France's allies among the German states (including Bavaria and Württemberg) established the Confederation of the Rhine in July 1806 following the Battle of Austerlitz (December 1805). Following the Battle of Jena-Auerstedt (October 1806), various other German states that had previously fought alongside the anti-French allies, including Saxony and Westphalia, also allied with France and joined the Confederation. Saxony changed sides again in 1813 during the Battle of Leipzig, causing most other member-states to quickly follow suit and declare war on France.) (Note: These four states were the leading nations of the Confederation, but the Confederation was made up of a total of 43 principalities, kingdoms, and duchies.); Duchy of Warsaw (Note: Napoleon established the Duchy of Warsaw, ruled by the Kingdom of Saxony in 1807. Polish Legions had already been serving in the French armies beforehand.); Etruria (Note: The French Empire annexed the Kingdom of Etruria in 1807.); (Netherlands) Holland (Note: The French Empire annexed the Kingdom of Holland in 1810. Dutch troops fought against Napoleon during the Hundred Days in 1815.); (Kingdom of Italy (Napoleonic)) Italy; Lucca-Piombino; (Kingdom of Naples) Naples (Note: Naples, briefly allied with Austria in 1814, allied with France again and fought against Austria during the Neapolitan War in 1815.); Polish Legions; Switzerland; (Austrian Empire) Austria (Note: Blücher, scourge of Napoleon, Leggiere) (Note: 1809–1813); Denmark–Norway (Note: Denmark–Norway remained neutral until the Battle of Copenhagen (1807). Denmark was compelled to cede Norway to Sweden by the Treaty of Kiel in 1814. Following a brief Swedish campaign against Norway, Norway entered a personal union with Sweden.) (Note: 1807–1814); Ottoman Empire (Note: 1806–1809); Persia (Note: 1804–1807, 1812–1813); (Kingdom of Prussia) Prussia; (Russian Empire) Russia; Spain (Note: 1803–1808); Sweden (Note: 1810–1812)
1803	1806	War of the Third Coalition; Part of the Napoleonic Wars	French Empire and allies: France; Batavian Republic (Kingdom of Italy (Napoleonic)) Italy (Kingdom of Italy (Napoleonic)) Etruria; Spain (Kingdom of Bavaria) Bavaria (Kingdom of Württemberg) Württemberg	Austrian Empire Russian Empire; United Kingdom (Kingdom of the Two Sicilies) Naples and Sicily; Sweden
1803	1837	Padri War	Adats; Netherlands	Padris
1804	1804	1804 Mtiuleti rebellion	Russian Empire	Georgian and Ossetian rebels
1804	1804	Battle of Suriname	United Kingdom	Batavian Republic
1804	1804	Battle of Sitka; Part of the Russian colonization of the Americas	Russian Empire	Tlingit: Kiks.ádi clan
1804	1813	First Serbian Uprising; Part of the Serbian Revolution	Ottoman Empire France	Revolutionary Serbia (Austrian Empire) Volunteers from Habsburg monarchy Russian Empire
1804	1804	Uprising against the Dahije; Part of the First Serbian Uprising	Karađorđe	Dahije
1804	1804	Castle Hill convict rebellion	(United Kingdom of Great Britain and Ireland) New South Wales	Convicts
1804	1808	Fulani War	Sokoto Caliphate	Hausa Kingdoms
1804	1813	Russo-Persian War (1804–1813); Part of the Napoleonic Wars	Russian Empire	Qajar dynasty
1805	1811	Egyptian Revolution; Part of the Napoleonic Wars	Albanian forces of Muhammad Ali	Ottoman Empire Mamluk Forces
1805	1805	Janissaries' Revolt	Ottoman Empire	Janissaries
1805	1810	Franco-Swedish War; Part of the Napoleonic Wars	France	Sweden
1805	1805	Haitian invasion of Santo Domingo	France Spain Captaincy General of Santo Domingo	First Empire of Haiti
1806	1807	War of the Fourth Coalition; Part of the Napoleonic Wars	French Empire and allies: France; Confederation of the Rhine Bavaria Württemberg Saxony (from Dec. 1806) Polish Legions (Kingdom of Italy (Napoleonic)) Italy (Kingdom of the Two Sicilies) Naples (Kingdom of Italy (Napoleonic)) Etruria (Netherlands) Holland; Swiss Confederation; Spain	Prussia Russia; United Kingdom; Saxony (1806 only); Sweden (Kingdom of the Two Sicilies) Sicily
1806	1812	Russo-Turkish War (1806–1812); Part of the Napoleonic Wars	Russian Empire	Ottoman Empire
1806	1807	British invasions of the Río de la Plata	Spain Río de la Plata Viceroyalty	United Kingdom
1806	1807	Ashanti–Fante War	Ashanti Empire (Netherlands) Holland	Fante Confederacy United Kingdom
1806	1811	War of Christophe's Secession	Forces of Henri Christophe	Forces of Alexandre Pétion
1806	1806	Vellore Mutiny	British East India Company	Vellore Sepoys
1807	1809	Anglo-Turkish War (1807–1809); Part of the Napoleonic Wars	Ottoman Empire	United Kingdom
1807	1807	Alexandria expedition of 1807	Egypt	British Empire
1807	1807	Tican's rebellion	Austrian Empire	Serbian Rebels
1807	1807	Froberg mutiny	British Empire	Navy Mutineers
1807	1807	Brazilian slave revolt of 1807	Colonial Brazil	Rebels
1807	1808	Janissaries' Revolt	Ottoman Empire	Janissaries
1807	1814	Gunboat War; Part of the Napoleonic Wars	United Kingdom	Denmark–Norway
1807	1812	Anglo-Russian War (1807–1812); Part of the Napoleonic Wars	United Kingdom	Russian Empire
1807	1807	Basi Revolt	Spain	Rebels
1807	1814	Peninsular War; Part of the Napoleonic Wars	Portugal; United Kingdom; Spain	France
1807	1818	Mtetwa Empire Expansion	Mthethwa Paramountcy	Other Tribes
1807	1842	New Zealand Musket Wars	Māori	Māori
1807	1808	Ottoman coups of 1807–08	Pro-reform factions	Anti-reform factions Janissaries
1808	1810	Rum Rebellion	United Kingdom	New South Wales Corps
1808	1809	Finnish War	Russian Empire	Sweden
1808	1809	Spanish reconquest of Santo Domingo; Part of the Napoleonic Wars	Spain Santo Domingo; British Empire	France
1808	1809	Dano-Swedish War of 1808–1809; Part of the Napoleonic Wars	Denmark–Norway; France	Sweden; United Kingdom
1808	1809	Travancore Rebellion	British Empire	Travancore; Kingdom of Cochin
1809	1809	Gurkha-Sikh War	Sikh Empire	Nepal
1809	1809	Persian Gulf campaign of 1809	United Kingdom; East India Company	Al Qasimi
1809	1809	Coup of 1809	Men of 1809	Sweden
1809	1809	War of the Fifth Coalition; Part of the Napoleonic Wars	France Duchy of Warsaw; Confederation of the Rhine Kingdom of Bavaria Saxony Württemberg (Kingdom of Westphalia) Westphalia (Kingdom of Italy (Napoleonic)) Italy; Naples; Swiss Confederation (Netherlands) Holland	Austria Tyrol; Hungary; United Kingdom (Kingdom of Prussia) Black Brunswickers; Sardinia (Kingdom of the Two Sicilies) Sicily
1809	1809	1809 Gottscheer Rebellion	France	Gottschee peasants
1809	1809	Tyrol Rebellion; Part of the Napoleonic Wars	Kingdom of Bavaria First French Empire; Kingdom of Italy	Austrian Empire Tyrolean Rebels
1809	1812	Quito Revolution (1809-1812); Part of the Spanish American wars of independence	Spain	Rebels
1809	1812	Burmese–Siamese War (1809–1812)	Siam	Burmese Empire
1809	1825	Bolivian War of Independence; Part of the Spanish American wars of independence	Bolivia	Spain

== 1810–1819 ==
Start	Finish	Name of conflict	Belligerents	
Start	Finish	Name of conflict	Victorious party (if applicable)	Defeated party (if applicable)
1810	1818	Argentine War of Independence; Part of the Spanish American wars of independence	United Provinces of the Río de la Plata Chile	(Spanish Empire) Spain
1810	1825	Colombian War of Independence; Part of the Spanish American wars of independence	Gran Colombia	(Spanish Empire) Spain
1810	1811	Tecumseh's War; Part of the War of 1812	United States; Chief Black Hoof	Tecumseh's Confederacy
1810	1810	US occupation of West Florida	United States	(Spanish Empire) Spain
1810	1820	Punjab War	Sikh Empire	British East India Company British Empire
1810	1826	Chilean War of Independence; Part of the Spanish American wars of independence	Chile United Provinces of the Río de la Plata	(Spanish Empire) Spain; Mapuche allies
1810	1810	Conquest of Hawaii	Kingdom of Hawaii	Other Hawaiian Tribes
1810	1818	Amadu's Jihad	Forces of Seku Amadu	Bamana Empire
1810	1821	Mexican War of Independence; Part of the Spanish American wars of independence	Mexican Army	(Spanish Empire) Spain
1811	1812	Cambodian rebellion (1811–12)	Cambodian pro-Siamese faction Rattanakosin Kingdom (Siam)	Cambodian pro-Vietnamese faction Nguyễn dynasty (Vietnam)
1811	1811	Battle of Khakeekera	Bahrain Kuwait	Diriyah
1811	1811	1811 German Coast uprising	United States	Rebel Slaves
1811	1811	Invasion of Java (1811)	British East India Company	France
1811	1811	Tonquin incident	United States	Tla-o-qui-aht
1811	1812	Fourth Xhosa War	(British Empire) Cape Colony	Xhosa Tribes
1811	1811	Ga–Fante War	Fante Confederacy Akwapim Tribes; Akim Tribes	Ashanti Empire Ga Tribes; British Empire; Dutch Empire
1811	1815	Arakanese Uprising	Burmese Empire	Rohingya Insurgents
1811	1811	Battle of Las Piedras; Part of the Spanish American wars of independence	(Uruguay) Forces of José Gervasio Artigas	(Spanish Empire) Spain
1811	1812	Cambodian Rebellion	Viet Nam Kingdom of Cambodia	Forces of Khmer Pretender Ang Snguon Siam
1811	1811	Paraguayan Revolt	Paraguay	Viceroyalty of Peru
1811	1818	Wahhabi War	Ottoman Empire	First Saudi State
1811	1823	Venezuelan War of Independence; Part of the Spanish American wars of independence	Venezuela; Gran Colombia; British Empire New Granada	Spain
1811	1826	Peruvian War of Independence; Part of the Spanish American wars of independence	Peru; United Provinces of the Río de la Plata; Gran Colombia Chile; British Empire	(Spanish Empire) Spain
1812	1812	Battle of Shela	Lamu	Mombasa; Pate
1812	1812	Hong Gyeong-Rae's Rebellion	Joseon dynasty	Forces loyal to Hong Gyeong-nae
1812	1812	Aponte conspiracy	(Spanish Empire) Spain	Slaves
1812	1812	French invasion of Russia; Part of the Napoleonic Wars	Russian Empire	France: Duchy of Warsaw; (Kingdom of Italy (Napoleonic)) Italy; Naples; Confederation of the Rhine; (Grand Duchy of Baden) Baden; Bavaria; Berg; Saxony; (Kingdom of Westphalia) Westphalia; Spain; Swiss Confederation; Allies: Austria; Prussia
1812	1814	War of the Sixth Coalition; Part of the Napoleonic Wars	Original Coalition: Russian Empire; Kingdom of Prussia; Austrian Empire; Sweden; United Kingdom of Great Britain and Ireland; Spain; Kingdom of Portugal (Kingdom of the Two Sicilies) Sicily; Kingdom of Sardinia; After Battle of Leipzig: Kingdom of Saxony; Kingdom of Bavaria; Württemberg	France; Kingdom of Italy (Napoleonic); Duchy of Warsaw (Kingdom of the Two Sicilies) Naples; Until January 1814; Denmark–Norway; Swiss Confederation; Confederation of the Rhine (Many member states defected after Battle of Leipzig)
1812	1815	War of 1812	British Empire: (British Empire); United States: United States	British Empire: (British Empire); United States: United States
1812	1821	Pemmican War	North West Company; Métis	Hudson's Bay Company; Selkirk's settlers
1813	1813	Eight Trigrams uprising of 1813	Qing dynasty	Eight Trigram Sect
1813	1837	Afghan-Sikh Wars	Sikh Empire	Durrani Empire; Emirate of Afghanistan
1813	1814	Creek War	United States Lower Creeks; Cherokees; Choctaws	"Red Sticks" (Creek Indians)
1813	1813	Peoria War	United States	Kickapoo Nation; Potawatomi Nation
1814	1814	Brazilian slave revolt of 1814	Colonial Brazil	Rebels
1814	1814	Swedish–Norwegian War; Part of the Napoleonic Wars	Sweden	Norway
1814	1816	Anglo-Nepalese War	British East India Company Forces of the Chogyal	Nepal
1814	1816	Ashanti–Akim–Akwapim War	Ashanti Empire	Akwapim Tribes Akim Tribes
1814	1814	Hadži Prodan's Revolt; Part of the Serbian Revolution	Ottoman Empire	(Serbia) Forces of Hadži Prodan Gligorijevic
1814	1880	Argentine Civil Wars	Federalists; Blancos	Unitarios; Colorados
1815	1815	Slachter's Nek Rebellion	United Kingdom	Boer Rebels
1815	1815	Second Barbary War	United States United Kingdom of the Netherlands; United Kingdom (from 1815)	Barbary States; Ottoman Empire
1815	1815	Second Kandyan War	British Empire	Kingdom of Kandy
1815	1815	Hundred Days; War of the Seventh Coalition	United Kingdom Kingdom of Prussia; Kingdom of France; Kingdom of Hanover; German Confederation; Austrian Empire; Russian Empire; Sweden; Netherlands; Spain; Kingdom of Portugal; Kingdom of Sardinia; Kingdom of the Two Sicilies; Grand Duchy of Tuscany	First French Empire Napoleonic Kingdom of Naples
1815	1815	Neapolitan War; Part of the Hundred Days	Austrian Empire Kingdom of the Two Sicilies; Grand Duchy of Tuscany; United Kingdom	Napoleonic Kingdom of Naples
1815	1815	Temne-Susu War	Kingdom of Koya	Susu Tribes
1815	1816	Spanish reconquest of New Granada; Part of the Spanish American wars of independence	Spanish Empire	United Provinces of New Granada
1815	1817	Second Serbian Uprising; Part of the Serbian Revolution	Principality of Serbia	Ottoman Empire
1816	1816	Bussa's Rebellion	British Empire	Barbadian slaves
1816	1816	Bombardment of Algiers	British Empire	Ottoman Empire: Algiers
1816	1820	Luso-Brazilian conquest of the Banda Oriental	United Kingdom of Portugal, Brazil and the Algarves	Federal League
1816	1857	Afaqi Khoja revolts	Qing dynasty	Aq Taghlik Khojas Supported by: Kokand Khanate
1817	1817	Pernambucan Revolt	United Kingdom of Portugal, Brazil and the Algarves	Pernambuco rebels
1817	1817	Pentrich rising	British Empire	Tax resisters
1817	1818	Third Anglo-Maratha War	British East India Company	Maratha Confederacy
1817	1818	First Seminole War; Part of the Seminole Wars	United States	Seminole Tribes
1817	1818	Uva Rebellion	British Empire	Kingdom of Kandy
1817	1819	Ndwandwe–Zulu War	Forces of Shaka Zulu	Forces of King Zwide
1817	1826	Burmese invasions of Assam	Burmese Empire	Kingdom of Ahom; Kingdom of Manipur
1817	1864	Caucasian War	Russian Empire	Avar Khanate Circassia; Kingdom of Kartli-Kakheti; Caucasian Imamate; Other Tribes of the North Caucasus
1818	1818	Akure–Benin War	(Benin Empire) Benin Kingdom	Akure Kingdom
1818	1819	Fifth Xhosa War	British Empire Khoikhoi Forces	Forces of Xhosa Chief Maqana Nxele
1818	1828	Zulu wars of conquest	Zulu Kingdom	Other remnants of the Mtetwa Paramountcy
1819	1820	Bolívar's campaign to liberate New Granada; Part of the Venezuelan War of Independence	United Provinces of New Granada	Spain
1819	1819	Chuguev uprising	Russian Empire	Chuguev Regiment

== 1820–1829 ==
Start	Finish	Name of conflict	Belligerents	
Start	Finish	Name of conflict	Victorious party (if applicable)	Defeated party (if applicable)
1820	1820	Revolution of 1820	Kingdom of the Two Sicilies	Carbonari
1820	1820	Cambodian rebellion (1820)	Cambodian pro-Siamese faction Rattanakosin Kingdom (Siam)	Khmer anti-Vietnamese rebels
1820	1824	Turco-Egyptian conquest of Sudan (1820-1824)	(Ottoman Empire) Egypt Eyalet	Funj Sultanate Sultanate of Darfur Shaigiya tribe
1820	1821	Farhi family revolt	Ottoman Empire	Farhi family and its Rebels
1820	1821	Bani Bu Ali expedition	Omani Empire; East India Company	Bani Bu Ali tribe
1820	1822	Ali Pasha's Revolt	Ottoman Empire	Ali Pasha of Yanina
1820	1822	Ecuadorian War of Independence; Part of the Spanish American wars of independence	Free Province of Guayaquil	Kingdom of Spain
1820	1823	Trienio Liberal	Kingdom of Spain; Kingdom of France	(Spain) Partisans of the Cortes
1820	1875	Texas–Indian wars	Spain; Mexico; Republic of Texas; United States	Comanche
1821	1821	Siamese invasion of Kedah	Rattanakosin Kingdom	Kedah Sultanate
1821	1825	Ijebu and Ife war against Owu	Ijebu Ife	Owu Kingdom
1821	1821	Wallachian uprising (1821)	Ottoman Empire	Principality of Wallachia
1821	1821	Niš Rebellion (1821)	Ottoman Empire	Niš Secret Organization
1821	1823	Ottoman–Persian War (1821–23)	Qajar Persia	Ottoman Empire
1821	1829	Greek War of Independence	(Greece) Greek revolutionaries Britain United States of the Ionian Islands Kingdom of France (1827 only); Russian Empire (1827 only)	Ottoman Empire: Egypt Eyalet; (Ottoman Empire) Beylik of Tunis (naval battles)
1821	1837	Padri War	Dutch Empire	Indigenous population of West Sumatra
1821	1829	Spanish attempts to reconquer Mexico	Mexico	(Spain) Spanish Empire
1821	1870	Comanche–Mexico Wars	Comanche; Kiowa	Mexico
1821	1821	1821 Alghero revolt	Kingdom of Sardinia	Rebels of Alghero
1822	1823	Mexican annexation of El Salvador	First Mexican Empire; Guatemala	El Salvador
1822	1823	Casa Mata Plan Revolution	Mexican Republicans	First Mexican Empire
1822	1825	Brazilian War of Independence	Empire of Brazil	Kingdom of Portugal
1822	1844	Haitian occupation of Santo Domingo	Republic of Spanish Haiti	Haiti
1823	1823	Hundred Thousand Sons of Saint Louis	France (Spain) Armée de la Foi	(Spain) Partisans of the Cortes
1823	1823	Ochomogo War; Part of the Mexican annexation of Central America	Republicans	Imperialists
1823	1823	Demerara rebellion of 1823	British Empire	Demerara slaves
1823	1823	Expedition to the West Coast of Borneo	Royal Netherlands East Company	Chinese Indonesian rebels
1823	1823	Revolt of Querétaro	Provisional Government of Mexico	Mexican Empire
1823	1831	First Anglo-Ashanti War	Ashanti Empire	British Empire
1823	1824	First Greek civil war	(Greece) Primates and supporters of the Government	Military leaders and supporters of Philiki Etaireia
1824	1824	Chumash revolt of 1824		
1824	1824	Bathurst War	British Empire	Wiradjuri
1824	1824	Confederation of the Equator Revolt	Empire of Brazil	Confederation of the Equator
1824	1824	First Bone War	Dutch Empire	Sulawesi Rebels
1824	1824	April Revolt	Portuguese Absolutists	Portuguese Liberals
1824	1825	Second Greek civil war	Roumeliotes and Islanders (Hydra)	Moreotes
1824	1826	First Anglo-Burmese War	Britain; British East India Company; Native Tribes	Burmese Empire
1825	1825	Second Bone War	Dutch Empire	Sulawesi Rebels
1825	1825	Battle of Tripoli (1825)	Kingdom of Sardinia	Tripolitania
1825	1828	Aegean Sea Anti-Piracy Operations of the United States	United States	Greek Pirates
1825	1825	Decembrist revolt	Russian Empire	(Russian Empire) Decembrists
1825	1828	Cisplatine War	Empire of Brazil	United Provinces of the Río de la PlataThirty-Three Orientals
1825	1830	Java War	Dutch Empire; Pro-Netherlands Javanese	Rebellion forces of Prince Diponegoro
1825	1825	Franco-Trarzan War of 1825	France; Comte de Villèle	Forces of Muhammad al Habib
1826	1826	Katamanso War	Dutch Empire; British Empire; Netherlands; Denmark	Ashanti Empire
1826	1837	Kurdish revolt of 1826–1837	Ottoman Empire	Kurdish rebels
1826	1829	First Central American Civil War	Liberals	Conservatives
1826	1828	Russo-Persian War (1826–28); Part of the Russo-Persian Wars	Russian Empire	Persian Empire
1826	1826	Chernigov Regiment revolt	Russian Empire	(Russian Empire) Decembrists
1826	1831	Sikh–Wahhabi War	Sikh Empire	Mujahideen; Kingdom of Amb; Peshawari Sardars; Pashtun tribes
1826	1828	Siamese-Lao War	Siam	Anouvong; King of Vientiane
1827	1827	1827 Honduran coup d'état	State of Honduras	Honduran Conservatives
1827	1827	Winnebago War	United States; Local militia	Winnebago
1828	1828	Peruvian–Bolivian War of 1828	Peru	Bolivia
1828	1829	Gran Colombia–Peru War	Gran Colombia	Peru
1828	1828	Irish and German Mercenary Soldiers' Revolt	Empire of Brazil	Irish and German mercenaries
1828	1828	Bombardment of Tripoli (1828)	Tripolitania	Kingdom of the Two Sicilies
1828	1834	Liberal Wars	Liberal forces of Queen Mary II United Kingdom; Spain	(Portugal) Absolutist forces of King Miguel
1828	1829	Russo-Turkish War (1828–29)	Russian Empire	Ottoman Empire
1828	1832	Black War	British Empire	Tasmanian Aborigines
1829	1830	Austrian expedition against Morocco (1829)	Austrian Empire	Morocco
1829	1830	Chilean Civil War of 1829–30	Pelucones; Military of Chile: Chilean Army; Chilean Navy	(Chile) Pipiolos
1829	1833	Anglo-Khasi War	British Empire	Khasi people

== 1830–1839 ==
Start	Finish	Name of conflict	Belligerents	
Start	Finish	Name of conflict	Victorious party (if applicable)	Defeated party (if applicable)
1830	1830	Freiämtersturm	Freie Ämter militia	Canton of Aargau
1830	1830	July Revolution; French Revolution of 1830	(July Monarchy) House of Orléans	House of Bourbon
1830	1831	November Uprising	Russian Empire	(Poland) Polish insurgents
1830	1831	Belgian Revolution	Southern Provinces of the Netherlands	United Kingdom of the Netherlands
1830	1847	French conquest of Algeria	France	Ottoman Empire: Algiers
1830	1850	Port Phillip District Wars	British Empire	Australian Aborigines
1831	1831	Dutch expedition on the west coast of Sumatra	Dutch Empire	Sumatran Rebels
1831	1831	Siege of Baghdad	Ottoman Empire	Mamluk Iraq
1831	1831	Merthyr Rising	British Empire	Coal Miners
1831	1831	Turner's Rebellion	United States	Slave Rebels
1831	1833	Kol uprising	British Empire	Adivasi Rebels
1831	1834	Siamese–Vietnamese War (1831–34)	Vietnam; Vietnamese protectorate of Cambodia	Siam
1831	1832	Baptist War	British Empire	Rebel slaves
1831	1832	Naning War	East India Company	Malay rebels
1831	1833	Egyptian–Ottoman War (1831–33)	Egypt	Ottoman Empire Russian Empire (from 1833)
1831	1833	Yagan Resistance	British Empire	Yagan
1831	1833	Bosnian Uprising (1831–32)	Ottoman Empire	Bosnian ayans
1832	1832	Black Hawk War	United States Ho-Chunk; Menominee; Potawatomi	Black Hawk's British Band: Sauk; Fox; Kickapoo
1832	1832	June Rebellion	France	French Republicans
1833	1834	Desert Campaign (1833–34)	Argentina	Mapuche rebels
1833	1835	Lê Văn Khôi revolt	Nguyễn dynasty	Lê Văn Khôi rebels
1833	1839	Albanian Revolts of 1833–39	Ottoman Empire	Albanian rebels
1833	1840	First Carlist War	Liberals and Allies: Forces of Queen Isabella II of Spain; British Empire; France; Forces of Queen Mary II of Portugal	Carlists: Forces of Infante Carlos of Spain; Forces of King Miguel of Portugal
1834	1834	Peruvian civil war of 1834	Government of Peru	Revolutionaries
1834	1834	Coorg War		
1834	1834	Priest Jovica's Rebellion	Ottoman Empire	Christian peasants
1834	1834	Peasants' Revolt of 1834 (Palestine)	Egypt Eyalet	Palestinian Peasants
1834	1834	Battle of Pinjarra	British Empire	Pinjarup
1834	1836	Sixth Xhosa War	British Empire (United Kingdom) Free Khoikhoi	Xhosa Tribes
1835	1858	1835–58 revolt in Ottoman Tripolitania	Ottoman Empire	Libyan rebels
1835	1836	Revolution of the Reforms	State of Venezuela	Reformists
1835	1836	Salaverry-Santa Cruz War	Supporters of Luis José de Orbegoso and Andrés de Santa Cruz	Supporters of Felipe Santiago Salaverry
1835	1835	League War	San José	Alajuela Cartago Cartago
1835	1835	Malê Revolt	Empire of Brazil	Muslim Nagos
1835	1835	Zacatecas Rebellion	Mexico	(Zacatecas) Zacatecan rebels
1835	1836	Toledo War		
1835	1836	Texas Revolution	Republic of Texas	Mexico
1835	1842	Second Seminole War; Part of the Seminole Wars	United States	Seminole Tribes
1835	1845	Ragamuffin War	Empire of Brazil	Riograndense Republic Juliana Republic
1835	1840	Cabanagem	Empire of Brazil	Indians; Cabanos
1836	1836	Posavina rebellion (1836)	Ottoman Empire	Bosnian nobility
1836	1836	Belogradchik rebellion (1836)	Ottoman Empire	Serbian peasants
1836	1836	Berkovitsa rebellion (1836)	Ottoman Empire	Bulgarian peasants
1836	1836	Pirot rebellion	Ottoman Empire	Orthodox peasants
1836	1839	War of the Confederation	Chile; North Peru; Argentine Confederation	Peru-Bolivian Confederation
1837	1838	Siege of Herat (1838) Afghan-Persian War	Emirate of Afghanistan	Qajar Iran
1837	1837	Revolt of 1837 (New Mexico)	Mexico	Cantón
1837	1838	Sabinada	Empire of Brazil	Bahia Republic
1837	1838	Lower Canada Rebellion; Part of the Rebellions of 1837	United Kingdom (United Kingdom) British North America	Patriote movement (United States) American Volunteers
1837	1838	Upper Canada Rebellion; Part of the Rebellions of 1837	United Kingdom (United Kingdom) British North America	Hunters' Lodges Republic of Canada
1837	1839	Dutch–Ahanta War	Dutch Empire	Ahanta Kingdom
1837	1847	Kenesary's Rebellion	Russian Empire	Kazakh Khanate
1838	1840	Muhammad Ali's Yemeni Expedition Part of the Yemeni–Ottoman Conflicts	Ottoman Empire	Zaidis
1838	1838	Battle of Blood River	Voortrekkers	Zulu kingdom
1838	1838	Mormon War	(United States) Non-Mormon Missourians	(United States) Latter Day Saint movement
1838	1839	Balaiada	Empire of Brazil	Balaios; African slaves
1838	1839	Pastry War	France	Mexico
1839	1839	Newport Rising	British Empire	Chartists
1839	1839	Züriputsch	Zürich	Conservative Putschists
1839	1841	Egyptian–Ottoman War (1839–41)	(United Kingdom) British Empire; Austrian Empire; Russian Empire Kingdom of Prussia; Ottoman Empire	Egypt; France; Spain
1839	1840	Khivan campaign of 1839	Khanate of Khiva	Russian Empire
1839	1841	War of the Supremes		
1838	1842	First Anglo-Afghan War	Emirate of Afghanistan	British Empire British East India Company
1839	1842	First Opium War	British Empire	(Qing dynasty) Qing Empire of China
1839	1847	Albanian Revolt of 1847	Ottoman Empire	Albanian rebels
1839	1851	Uruguayan Civil War	Colorados (Argentina) Argentine Unitarians; France; Riograndense Republic; British Empire; Empire of Brazil; Italian Legion	Blancos Federalists; Argentine Confederation
1840	1841	Cambodian rebellion (1840)	Khmer anti-Vietnamese rebels Support: Rattanakosin Kingdom (Siam)	Nguyễn dynasty (Vietnam)
1830s	1860s	Eumerella Wars	British Empire	Gunditjmara people

== 1840–1849 ==
Start	Finish	Name of conflict	Belligerents	
Start	Finish	Name of conflict	Victorious party (if applicable)	Defeated party (if applicable)
1841	1841	Niš Rebellion (1841)	Ottoman Empire	Christian rebels
1841	1841	1841 rebellion in Guria	(Russia) Russian Empire	Guria Peasants
1841	1845	Siamese–Vietnamese War (1841–45)	Vietnam; Cambodia protectorates loyal to King Ang Duong	
1841	1842	Sino-Sikh War	China	Sikh Empire
1842	1847	Kurdish revolt of 1842–1847	Ottoman Empire	Emirate of Botan
1842	1842	Shoorcha rebellion	Russian Empire	Chuvash Peasants; Tatar Peasants; Mari Peasants
1842	1868	Russian Conquest of Bukhara	Russian Empire	Emirate of Bukhara
1842	1843	Mier expedition	Mexico	Texas
1843	1844	Peruvian civil war of 1843–1844	Revolutionaries	Peruvian government
1843	1844	Albanian Revolt of 1843–44	Ottoman Empire	Albanian rebels
1843	1843	Wairau Affray; Part of the New Zealand Wars	Ngāti Toa	(United Kingdom of Great Britain and Ireland) British Settlers
1843	1843	Battle of One Tree Hill	(United Kingdom of Great Britain and Ireland) British Settlers	Jagera people
1844	1856	Dominican War of Independence	Dominican Republic	Haiti
1844	1864	Egba-Dahomey War	Egba people of Abeokuta	Kingdom of Dahomey
1844	1844	Franco-Moroccan War	France	Morocco
1844	1847	Franco-Tahitian War	France; Tahitian allies	Tahiti; Huahine; Raiatea; Bora Bora and Tahaa
1844	1845	Malespín's War	El Salvador; Honduras	Nicaragua
1845	1845	Albanian Revolt of 1845	Ottoman Empire	Albanian rebels
1845	1846	First Anglo-Sikh War	British East India Company	Sikh Empire
1845	1846	Flagstaff War; Northern War; Part of the New Zealand Wars	Ngāpuhi Iwi	British Empire Forces of Tamati Waka Nene
1846	1847		Venezuela	Federal rebels
1846	1846	Revolution of Maria da Fonte	(Kingdom of Portugal) Portuguese Empire	Tax Resisters
1846	1846	Hutt Valley Campaign; Part of the New Zealand Wars	British Empire (United Kingdom) British Settlers; Te Āti Awa	Ngāti Toa
1846	1846	Kraków uprising	Austrian Empire	Polish independence movement
1846	1846	Galician slaughter	Austrian Empire	Polish peasants
1846	1846	Dutch intervention in Northern Bali (1846)	Netherlands	Bali
1846	1846	Revolt of the Faitiões	(Kingdom of Portugal) Portuguese Empire	Faitiões
1846	1847	Patuleia	Cartistas	Septembrists; Miguelists
1846	1847	Seventh Xhosa War	British Empire	Xhosa Tribes
1846	1849	Second Carlist War; War of the Madrugadores	Forces of Queen Isabella II of Spain	(Spain) Carlists
1846	1848	Mexican–American War	United States	Mexico
1846	1848	Wanganui Campaign; Part of the New Zealand Wars	British Empire (United Kingdom) British Settlers; Māori Kupapa	Māori Iwis
1847	1847	Sonderbund War	Swiss Confederation	Sonderbund
1847	1850	Sierra Gorda Rebellion	Mexico	Tax Resisters
1847	1855	Cayuse War	United States	Cayuse
1847	1933	Caste War of Yucatán	Mexico	Maya Free State
1847	1847	Operations against the Baizai (1847)	British Empire	Baizai Tribesmen
1848	1849	Venezuelan Civil War of 1848–1849	State of Venezuela	Rebels
1848	1849	Revolutions of 1848 in the Italian states	Austrian Empire; Kingdom of Two Sicilies; Papal States	Kingdom of Sicily; Provisional Government of Milan; Republic of San Marco; Roman Republic; Central Italy Rebels; Supported by: Kingdom of Sardinia
1848	1848	Greater Poland Uprising (1848)	Kingdom of Prussia	Polish rebels
1848	1848	French Revolution of 1848	French Republic	July Monarchy
1848	1849	Revolutions of 1848 in the German states	German Confederation; Austrian Empire; Baden; Prussia; Kingdom of Saxony Kingdom of Bavaria	German Rebels
1848	1849	Baden Revolution; Part of the Revolutions of 1848 in the German states	Baden	Freischar
1848	1849	Revolutions of 1848 in the Habsburg areas		
1848	1848	Wallachian Revolution of 1848	Ottoman Empire; Russian Empire	Wallachia
1848	1849	Sicilian revolution of independence of 1848	Kingdom of the Two Sicilies; Supported by: Kingdom of Spain	Kingdom of Sicily; Supported by: Congress Poland
1848	1848	Dutch intervention in Northern Bali (1848)	Netherlands	Bali
1848	1848	Matale rebellion	British Empire	Kandian Peasants
1848	1849	First Italian War of Independence	Austrian Empire	Kingdom of Sardinia Grand Duchy of Tuscany; Papal States; Kingdom of the Two Sicilies
1848	1849	Second Anglo-Sikh War	British Empire British East India Company	Sikh Empire
1848	1849	Hungarian War of Independence	Austrian Empire Russian Empire	Hungary
1848	1849	Serb Uprising of 1848–49	Serbs (Austrian Empire); Serbian volunteers Austrian Empire	Hungary
1848	1849	Praieira revolt	Empire of Brazil	Praieiros
1848	1849	Slovak Uprising of 1848–49	(Slovakia) Slovak National Council	Kingdom of Hungary
1848	1851	First Schleswig War; The Three Years' War	Denmark	Schleswig-Holstein Prussia; Kingdom of Saxony
1849	1850	Dutch intervention in Bali (1849)	Netherlands; Lombok	Buleleng; Jembrana; Klungkung
1849	1849	May Uprising in Dresden; Part of the Revolutions of 1848 in the German states	Prussia; Kingdom of Saxony	Freischar
1849	1849	Palatine uprising Part of the Revolutions of 1848 in the German states	Kingdom of Bavaria	Freischar
1849	1849	Yemeni Expedition of 1849 Part of the Yemeni–Ottoman Conflicts	Zaidis	Ottoman Empire
1849	1855	Burmese–Siamese War (1849–55)	Burma	Siam
1849	1924	Apache Wars	United States (1849–1924); Confederate States of America (1861–1865)	Apacheria: Chiricahua Apache; Jicarilla Apache; Mescalero Apache; Lipan Apache; Western Apache; Plains Apache; Apache Allies: Ute; Yavapai; Comanche; Cheyenne; Kiowa; Yuma; Mohave
1849	1849	Operations against the Baizai (1849)	British Empire	Baizai Tribesmen

== 1850–1859 ==
Start	Finish	Name of conflict	Belligerents	
Start	Finish	Name of conflict	Victorious party (if applicable)	Defeated party (if applicable)
1850	1856	Soninke-Marabout War (1850–1856)	British Empire; French Empire	Marabout confederacy Kingdom of the Kombo (Soninke)
1850	1864	Taiping Rebellion	China British Empire; French Empire	Taiping Heavenly Kingdom
1850	1853	Eighth Xhosa War	British Empire	Xhosa Tribes Khoikhoi Tribes (United Kingdom of Great Britain and Ireland) Native Kafir Police
1850	1868	Russo-Kokand War	Russian Empire	Khanate of Kokand Emirate of Bukhara
1851	1851	1851 Chilean Revolution	Chile	Liberal rebels
1851	1851	Bombardment of Salé	France	Morocco
1851	1851	1851 French coup d'état	French Second Republic under Louis-Napoléon Bonaparte	Republicans
1851	1852	Platine War	Empire of Brazil Uruguay; Entre Ríos; Corrientes; Santa Fe	Argentine Confederation Blancos
1851	1855	Palembang Highlands Expeditions	Dutch Empire	Palembangese Rebels
1851	1865	California Indian Wars	United States	Miwok; Yokuts; Cahuilla; Cupeno; Quechan; Yurok; Karuk; Tolowa; Nomlaki; Chimariko; Wintun; Hupa; Tsnungwe; Wiyot; Whilkut; Yuki
1851	1868	Nian Rebellion	Qing dynasty	Nien militia
1852	1852	Kautokeino rebellion	Sweden-Norway	Sami rebels
1852	1852	Second Anglo-Burmese War	British Empire	Burma
1852	1853	Montenegrin–Ottoman War (1852–53)	Montenegro	Ottoman Empire
1852	1862	Herzegovina Uprising (1852–62)	Ottoman Empire	Serbian rebels
1853	1854		State of Venezuela	Rebels
1853	1856	Crimean War	Ottoman Empire; French Empire (from 1854); Britain (from 1854); Kingdom of Sardinia (from 1855) Caucasian Imamate (until 1855); Circassia; Abkhazian insurgents (from 1855); Egypt Eyalet Beylik of Tunis	Russian Empire; Bulgarian volunteers; Principality of Mingrelia (vassal) Kurdish rebels Kingdom of Greece (until 1854)
1854	1854	1854 Macedonian rebellion	Ottoman Empire	Macedonian rebels
1854	1855	Expedition against the Chinese in Montrado	Netherlands	Pro-Chinese Indonesian rebels Chinese volunteers Supported by: (Qing dynasty) China
1854	1854	Epirus Revolt of 1854	Ottoman Empire	Greek rebels
1854	1857	Revolution of Ayutla	(Mexico) Mexican rebels	(Mexico) Santa Anna dictatorship
1854	1873	Miao Rebellion (1854–73)	China	Miao people
1854	1860	French conquest of Senegal	French Empire	Kingdom of Waalo; Toucouleur Empire
1854	1856	Red Turban Rebellion (1854–56)	Qing Empire of China	Tiandihui
1854	1861	Bleeding Kansas	Free-Stater (Kansas)	Border ruffians
1855	1855	Kurdish revolt of 1855	Ottoman Empire Supported by: French Empire British Empire	Kurdish rebels
1855	1855	First Fiji Expedition	United States	Fiji
1855	1856	Nepalese–Tibetan War	Kingdom of Nepal	Tibet
1855	1856	Santhal rebellion	British Raj; Zamindars	Santal rebels
1855	1858	Yakima War	United States	Yakama
1855	1855	Rogue River Wars	United States	Rogue River
1855	1855	Battle of Ash Hollow	United States	Brulé Sioux
1855	1856	Puget Sound War	United States	Nisqually; Muckleshoot; Puyallup; Klickitat; Haida; Tlingit
1855	1858	Third Seminole War part of the Seminole Wars	United States	Seminole Tribes
1855	1864	Nias Expedition	Dutch Empire	Nias Rebels
1855	1867	Punti-Hakka Clan Wars	Punti	Hakka
1856	1857	Peruvian civil war of 1856–1858		
1856	1857	Filibuster War	Allied Central American Army (Ejército Aliado Centroamericano) Costa Rica; Honduras; Guatemala; El Salvador; Nicaragua: Legitimistas (conservative party); Democráticos (liberal party); United States (naval support)	Filibusters
1856	1857	Khost rebellion (1856–1857)	Emirate of Afghanistan	Khostwal and Waziri tribesmen
1856	1857	Campaign of 1856–57	Costa Rica Guatemala; El Salvador; Honduras (Nicaragua) Rebel Forces of Patricio Rivas	Republic of Sonora Nicaragua
1856	1856	Battle of Tres Forcas	Morocco	(Kingdom of Prussia) Prussia
1856	1860	Second Opium War; Arrow War	United Kingdom French Empire; United States (1856 and 1859 only)	(Qing dynasty) Qing Empire of China
1856	1857	Anglo-Persian War	(United Kingdom) British Empire: East India Company; Afghanistan	Persia
1856	1873	Panthay Rebellion; Du Wenxiu Rebellion	(Qing dynasty) Qing Empire of China	Pingnan Guo
1856	1857	1857 Cheyenne Expedition	United States	Cheyenne
1857	1858	Indian Rebellion of 1857; India's First War of Independence	British Empire British East India Company; Nepal; Jammu and Kashmir; 20 Princely states	Sepoys of the East India Company Mughal Empire; Awadh; Jhansi; Jagdishpur; Kohra; Bijairaghogarh; Tulsipur State; 7 Princely states
1857	1858	Utah War	United States	State of Deseret Utah Territory; Nauvoo Legion
1857	1860	Ecuadorian–Peruvian War (1857–1860)	Peru	Ecuador
1857	1861	Reform War	(Mexico) Liberals; United States	(Mexico) Conservatives
1857	1861	Cibaenian Revolution	Dominican Republic Liberals Supported by: Conservatives; Kingdom of Spain	Revolutionary Government of Cibao
1857	1863	Pahang Civil War	(Pahang) Wan Ahmad loyalists Terengganu Sultanate (Thailand) Rattanakosin Kingdom	(Pahang) Tun Mutahir loyalists Johor; United Kingdom
1858	1858	March Revolution (Venezuela)		
1858	1858	Mahtra War	Russian Empire	Estonian peasants
1858	1858	Coeur d'Alene War	United States	Spokane; Coeur d'Alene; Paloos; Northern Paiute
1858	1858	Fraser Canyon War	United States; British Empire	Nlaka'pamux
1858	1858	Pecija's First Revolt	Ottoman Empire	Serbian peasants
1858	1862	Cochinchina Campaign	French Empire; Kingdom of Spain	Dai Nam
1859	1859	Indigo revolt	British Empire	Bengali Peasants
1859	1859	Third Fiji expedition	United States	Fiji
1859	1859	Second Italian War of Independence	French Empire Kingdom of Sardinia	Austrian Empire
1859	1859	Revolution of 1859	Chile	Liberal rebels
1859	1872	Pig War	United States	United Kingdom
1859	1860	Hispano-Moroccan War (1859–60)	Spain	Morocco
1859	1863	Banjarmasin War	Dutch Empire	Sultanate of Banjar
1859	1863	Federal War	Venezuelan Federalists	Venezuelan Conservatives
1859	1859	1859 Perugia uprising	Papal States	Rebels

== 1860–1869 ==
Start	Finish	Name of conflict	Belligerents	
Start	Finish	Name of conflict	Victorious party (if applicable)	Defeated party (if applicable)
1860	1860	Expedition of the Thousand	Kingdom of Italy	Two Sicilies Papal States
1860	1860	Portugal–Angoche conflict	(Kingdom of Portugal) Portuguese Empire: Mozambique	Angoche Sultanate
1860	1860	1860 Mount Lebanon civil war	Rural Druze clans: Abu Nakad clan; Imad clan; Abu Harmouch clan; Talhuq clan; Jumblatt clan; Supported by: al-Atrash clan; Harfush clan; Rural Sunni and Shia Muslim militiamen; Sardiyah tribe	Maronites and allies: Rural Maronite militiamen; Zahalni militiamen; Shihab dynasty
1860	1860	Paiute War	United States	Paiute tribes
1860	1861	First Taranaki War; Second Māori War; Part of New Zealand Wars	Māori iwi (tribes) Māori King Movement	(United Kingdom) Government of New Zealand (United Kingdom) British Settlers
1860	1862	Colombian Civil War (1860–62)	Granadine Confederation	Federal State of Cauca
1860	1890	Barasa–Ubaidat War	Ubaidat Tribe	Barasa Tribe
1861	1883	Occupation of Araucanía	Chile	Araucanía
1861	1865	American Civil War	United States of America	Confederate States of America
1861	1867	French intervention in Mexico; Also known as Franco-Mexican War	(Mexico) United Mexican States Supported by : United States of America (entered in 1865)	Second French Empire (Mexico) Second Mexican Empire; Austrian Empire (German and Hungarian volunteers) (Belgium) Belgian Foreign Legion; Egyptian Sudanese Supported by : Kingdom of Spain (retired in 1862); United Kingdom (retired in 1862)
1862	1862	Dakota War of 1862	United States	Dakota Sioux
1862	1877	Dungan Revolt (1862–77); Muslim Rebellion	Qing Empire of China	Muslims of China
1863	1863	Ecuadorian–Colombian War	United States of Colombia	Ecuador
1863	1863	Battle of Shimonoseki Straits	United States	Chōshū Domain
1863	1863	Bombardment of Kagoshima; Anglo-Satsuma War	British Empire	Satsuma Domain
1863	1864	Shimonoseki Campaign	British Empire Netherlands; United States; Second French Empire	Choshu Domain Chofu Domain; Kiheitai Volunteers
1863	1864	Ambela campaign	British Raj	Afghan Pashtuns; Yusufzai
1863	1864	Invasion of Waikato; Part of New Zealand Wars	(United Kingdom) Government of New Zealand Māori Kupapa	Māori King Movement
1863	1864	Second Anglo-Ashanti War	Ashanti Empire	British Empire
1863	1865	Dominican Restoration War	Dominican Republic	Spain
1863	1864	January Uprising	Russian Empire	Polish-Lithuanian-Ruthenian Commonwealth
1863	1865	Colorado War	United States	Cheyenne; Arapaho
1863	1866	Second Taranaki War; Part of New Zealand Wars	British Empire	Māori of Taranaki
1864	1864	Kinmon Incident and First Chōshū expedition	Tokugawa Shogunate Satsuma Domain	Aizu Domain Choshu Domain; Sonno joi Rebels
1864	1864	Second Schleswig War; Second Danish-German War	(Germany) German Confederation Austrian Empire; Kingdom of Prussia	Denmark
1864	1864	Battle of Dybbøl; Part of Second Schleswig War	(Kingdom of Prussia) Prussia	Denmark
1864	1864	Tauranga Campaign; Part of the New Zealand Wars	(United Kingdom) Government of New Zealand (United Kingdom) British Settlers; Māori Kupapa	Ngāi Te Rangi Iwi
1864	1865	Uruguayan War	Empire of Brazil; Colorados	Uruguay
1864	1865	Mejba Revolt	Beylik of Tunis	Tax resisters
1864	1865	Mito Rebellion; Kanto insurrection Part of the Japanese Civil War	Tokugawa Shogunate Mito Domain	Sonno joi Rebels of Eastern Japan
1864	1865	Bhutan War	British Empire	Bhutan
1864	1866	Chincha Islands War	Peru; Chile; Joined in 1866: Ecuador; Bolivia	Spain
1864	1868	Snake War	United States	Shoshone, Bannock, and Paiute Tribes
1864	1868	Pasoemah Expedition	Dutch Empire	Sumatran Rebels
1864	1870	Paraguayan War	Empire of Brazil; Argentina; Uruguay	Paraguay
1865	1865	Peruvian civil war of 1865	Revolutionaries	Government of Peru
1865	1875	Saudi Civil War	Supporters of Saud	Supporters of Rahman
1865	1872	Black Hawk War (1865–72)	United States	Ute; Paiute; Navajo; Apache
1865	1865	Powder River Expedition (1865)	United States	Arapaho; Sioux; Cheyenne
1865	1865	Morant Bay rebellion	British Empire	(United Kingdom) Jamaican Rebels
1865	1870	Hualapai War	United States	Hualapai
1865	1866	Seqiti War	Basuto Kingdom British Empire	Orange Free State
1865	1868	East Cape War; Part of the New Zealand Wars	(United Kingdom) Government of New Zealand (United Kingdom) British Settlers; Māori Kupapa	Hau-Hauist Māori
1865	1868	Russo-Bukharan Wars	Russian Empire	Emirate of Bukhara
1865	1890	Haw wars	(Thailand) Kingdom of Siam	Haw rebels
1866	1866	Second Chōshū expedition Summer War	Choshu Domain	Tokugawa Shogunate Aizu Domain
1866	1866	Austro-Prussian War; Seven Weeks War; German Civil War	Kingdom of Prussia Kingdom of Italy; Mecklenburg-Schwerin; Oldenburg; County of Anhalt; Duchy of Brunswick; Duchy of Saxe-Altenburg; Saxe-Coburg and Gotha (Germany) Principality of Waldeck-Pyrmont; County of Schwarzburg-Sondershausen; Principality of Lippe; Bremen; Hamburg; Lübeck	Austrian Empire Kingdom of Saxony; Kingdom of Bavaria; Grand Duchy of Baden; Kingdom of Württemberg (Province of Hanover) Kingdom of Hanover; Grand Duchy of Hesse; Hesse-Kassel (Germany) Principality of Reuss Elder Line; Duchy of Saxe-Meiningen; County of Schaumburg-Lippe; Nassau
1866	1866	Third Italian War of Independence; Part of the Austro-Prussian War	Kingdom of Italy	Austrian Empire
1866	1868	Red Cloud's War	Lakota Tribe	United States
1866	1866	Baikal Insurrection	(Russia) Russian Empire	Sybiracy
1866	1869	Cretan Revolt (1866–69)	(Greece) Greek rebels	Ottoman Empire
1866	1866	French campaign against Korea (1866); Byeongin Western invasion	Joseon dynasty (Korea)	Second French Empire
1866	1867	1867 Macedonian rebellion	Ottoman Empire	Greek revolutionaries.
1867	1867	Peruvian civil war of 1867	Revolutionaries (Conservatives)	Government of Peru (Liberals)
1867	1867	La Genuina		
1867	1868	Blue revolution (Venezuela)		
1867	1867	Andaman Islands Expedition	British Empire	Onge rebels
1867	1875	Comanche Campaign	United States	Comanche; Arapaho; Kiowa; Southern Cheyenne
1867	1868	Qatari–Bahraini War	Al Thani	Al Khalifa
1867	1874	Klang War; Selangor Civil War	Forces of Raja Abdullah of Klang British Straits Settlements	Forces of Raja Mahadi
1868	1874	Six Years' War	Dominican Liberals	Dominican Conservatives
1868	1868	Glorious Revolution (Spain)	Spain (Liberals)	Spain (Moderados)
1868	1868	Grito de Lares	Spain	Puerto Rican Rebels
1868	1869	Tītokowaru's War; Part of the New Zealand Wars	(United Kingdom) Government of New Zealand Māori Kupapa	Ngati Ruanui Iwi
1868	1869	Boshin War; War of the Year of the Dragon; Part of the Japanese Civil War	Imperial Faction: Forces of the Emperor of Japan; Satsuma Domain; Choshu Domain; Tosa Domain; Hiroshima Domain; Saga Domain; British Empire	Tokugawa Shogunate Northern Alliance; Republic of Ezo; Second French Empire
1868	1868	British Expedition to Abyssinia	British Empire	Ethiopian Empire
1868	1872	Te Kooti's War; Part of the New Zealand Wars	(United Kingdom) Government of New Zealand (United Kingdom) British Settlers; Māori Kupapa	Māori iwi
1868	1878	Ten Years' War; Great War	Spain	Cuba
1869	1869	Haitian Revolution of 1869	(Haiti) Forces of Nissage Saget	(Haiti) Forces of Sylvain Salnave
1869	1869	1869 uprising in Krivošije	Serbian Rebels	Austria-Hungary
1869	1869	Red River Rebellion	Dominion of Canada Métis Loyalists; British Empire	Métis Forces of Louis Riel

== 1870–1879 ==
Start	Finish	Name of conflict	Belligerents	
Start	Finish	Name of conflict	Victorious party (if applicable)	Defeated party (if applicable)
1870	1870	Kirk–Holden war	United States	Ku Klux Klan
1870	1871	Al-Hasa Expedition	Ottoman Empire Kuwait	Nejd
1870	1870	Adai rebellion	Russian Empire	Kazakhs of Aday
1870	1871	Franco-Prussian War	North German Confederation Kingdom of Bavaria; Baden; Kingdom of Württemberg	Second French Empire
1870	1872	Revolution of the Lances	Blancos	Colorados
1870	1900	Sheep Wars	(United States) Cattle Ranchers	(United States) Sheepmen
1870	1890	Kalkadoon Wars	British colonists	Kalkadoon people
1871	1871	French Civil War of 1871	French Republic	Communards
1871	1871	United States expedition to Korea	United States	Joseon dynasty (Korea)
1871	1872	Nukapu Expedition	United Kingdom	Nukapu
1872	1873	Dembos War (1872–1873)	Portugal	rebels
1872	1872	Yemeni Expedition of 1872 Part of the Yemeni–Ottoman Conflicts	Ottoman Empire	Zaidis
1872	1876	Third Carlist War	Kingdom of Spain (Savoy) (to 1873); First Spanish Republic (to 1874); Kingdom of Spain (Bourbon) (from 1875)	Carlists
1872	1873	Modoc War; Lava Beds War	United States	Modoc Tribes
1873	1873	Khivan campaign of 1873	Russian Empire	Khanate of Khiva
1873	1904	Aceh War	(Netherlands) Dutch East Indies	Aceh Sultanate
1873	1874	Revolt of the Muckers	Empire of Brazil	Muckers
1873	1874	Pabna Peasant Uprisings	British Empire	Bengali Peasants
1873	1874	Third Anglo-Ashanti War	British Empire	Ashanti Empire
1873	1888	Colfax County War	(United States) Settlers Jicarilla Apaches	(United States) Maxwell Land Grant
1875	1894	Cantonal Revolution	First Spanish Republic	Spanish Cantons
1874	1874	Brooks–Baxter War	Republican Party	Liberal Republican Party
1874	1874	Saga Rebellion	Empire of Japan	Rebels of former Saga Domain
1874	1874	Japanese invasion of Taiwan (1874)	Empire of Japan	Qing Empire
1874	1875	Red River War	United States	Comanche Tribes Kiowa Tribes; Southern Cheyenne Tribes; Arapaho Tribes
1874	1876	Ethiopian–Egyptian War	Ethiopia	Egypt
1875	1875	Ganghwa Island incident	Empire of Japan	(Korea) Joseon dynasty
1875	1875	Las Cuevas War	(United States) Texas Rangers	(Mexico) Mexican Militia
1875	1876	Perak War	British Empire	Malay rebels
1875	1876	Mason County War	(United States) Vigilantes (United States) German-American settlers	(United States) Texas Rangers
1876	1876	Shinpuren Rebellion	Empire of Japan	Keishintō: Samurai of former the Kumamoto Domain
1876	1876	Razlovtsi insurrection	Ottoman Empire	Bulgarian rebels
1876	1876	April Uprising	Ottoman Empire	Bulgarian rebels
1876	1876	Akizuki Rebellion	Empire of Japan	Samurai of former the Akizuki Domain
1876	1876	Hagi Rebellion	Empire of Japan	Choshu Domain
1876	1877	Colombian Civil War of 1876	Colombian Liberals	Colombian Conservatives
1876	1877	Great Sioux War of 1876; Black Hills War	United States Shoshone Tribes; Crow Nation; Pawnee Tribes	Arapaho Tribes Cheyenne Tribes; Lakota Tribes
1876	1878	Qing reconquest of Xinjiang	Qing dynasty	Kashgaria
1876	1878	Montenegrin–Ottoman War (1876–78); Part of the Great Eastern Crisis	Montenegro	Ottoman Empire
1877	1890	Angoche Civil War	Followers of Farelay	6 other claimants to the throne of the Angoche Sultanate
1877	1877	Nez Perce War	United States	Nez Perce
1877	1877	Satsuma Rebellion	Empire of Japan	Samurai of former the Satsuma Domain, Kumamoto Domain Shi-gakkō
1877	1878	San Elizario Salt War	United States	Mexican-Indians
1877	1879	Ninth Xhosa War	British Empire Mfengu Tribe	Xhosa Gcaleka Tribe
1877	1878	Russo-Turkish War (1877–78)	Russian Empire Serbia; Romania; Montenegro; Bulgarian volunteers	Ottoman Empire
1877	1879	Cheyenne War	United States	Cheyenne
1877	1893	Kiriji War	Ibadan; Iwo Kingdom; Igbajo; Offa Kingdom; Modakeke	Ijesha Kingdom; Ekiti Confederacy; Akoko Confederacy Egba Kingdom; Ijebu Kingdom; Ila Kingdom; Ilorin Emirate; Ife Kingdom
1878	1878	Bannock War	United States	Bannock; Northern Shoshone
1878	1878	Austro-Hungarian campaign in Bosnia and Herzegovina in 1878	Austria-Hungary	Bosnia Vilayet
1878	1878	Kanak Revolt	France	Kanaks
1878	1878	Lincoln County War	(United States) Ranchers (United States) Regulators	(United States) General Store Monopoly; John Kinney Gang; Jesse Evans Gang; Seven Rivers Warriors
1878	1878	Kumanovo Uprising	Ottoman Empire	(Principality of Serbia) Serbian rebels
1878	1878	Epirus Revolt of 1878	Ottoman Empire	(Kingdom of Greece) Greek rebels
1878	1878	1878 Greek Macedonian rebellion	Ottoman Empire	(Kingdom of Greece) Greek rebels
1878	1879	Kresna–Razlog Uprising	Ottoman Empire	Bulgarian rebels
1878	1880	Second Anglo-Afghan War	British Empire	Afghanistan
1878	1885	Conquest of the Desert	Argentina	Araucans
1878	1888	Nauruan Civil War	King Aweida Loyalists German Empire (1888)	Anti-Aweida rebels
1879	1880	Little War (Cuba)	Kingdom of Spain	Cuba
1879	1879	Jementah Civil War	Johor Sultanate	Muar
1879	1879	Anglo-Zulu War	British Empire (United Kingdom) Colony of Natal	Zulu Kingdom
1879	1879	Second Sekhukhune War	British Empire	BaPedi Kingdom
1879	1883	War of the Pacific	Chile	Peru; Bolivia
1879	1879	Sheepeater Indian War	United States	Turakina
1879	1881	Victorio's War	United States; Mexico	Apache

== 1880–1889 ==
Start	Finish	Name of conflict	Belligerents	
Start	Finish	Name of conflict	Victorious party (if applicable)	Defeated party (if applicable)
1880	1881	Basuto Gun War	Basotho Tribe	Cape Colony
1880	1881	Brsjak Revolt	Ottoman Empire	Christian rebels
1880	1881	Kurdish revolt of 1880–1881	Ottoman Empire	Kurdish rebels
1880	1881	First Boer War	South African Republic	British Empire
1881	1881	Mapuche uprising of 1881	Chile	Mapuche rebels
1881	1881	French occupation of Tunisia	France	Tunisia
1881	1899	Mahdist War	Egypt British Empire; Italy; Belgium; Ethiopian Empire	Mahdist Sudan
1882	1882	Anglo-Egyptian War	British Empire Egypt	Egyptian rebels under Arabi Pasha
1882	1898	Mandingo Wars	(France) French Third Republic	Wassoulou Empire
1882	1892	Pleasant Valley War	(United States) Tewksbury Family (United States) Arizona Rangers	(United States) Graham and Blevins Family
1883	1914	Ekumeku Movement	British Empire	Ekumeku Organization
1883	1883	Timok Rebellion	Kingdom of Serbia	People's Radical Party
1883	1885	First Madagascar expedition	(France) French Third Republic	Merina Kingdom
1883	1886	Tonkin Campaign	(France) French Third Republic	Qing dynasty Black Flag Army; Nguyen dynasty
1884	1885	Peruvian civil war of 1884–1885	Reds Bolivia	Blues Chile
1884	1884	Chichibu Incident	Empire of Japan	Japanese peasants
1884	1885	Sino-French War	France Annam Protectorate	Qing dynasty of China; Remnants of the Nguyen dynasty of Vietnam Black Flag Army
1884	1885	Mandor Rebellion	Dutch Empire	Lanfang Republic
1885	1885		Russian Empire	Tajik Rebels
1885	1885	North-West Rebellion	Canada	Provisional Government of Saskatchewan Cree–Assiniboine
1885	1885	Serbo-Bulgarian War	Bulgaria	Serbia
1885	1885	Barrios' War of Reunification	El Salvador; Mexico; Costa Rica; Nicaragua	Guatemala; Honduras
1885	1885	Third Anglo-Burmese War	British Empire	Third Burmese Empire
1885	1885	Jambi Uprising	Dutch Empire	Sumatran Rebels
1886	1894	Samoan Civil War	(Samoa) Mata'afans	(Samoa) Tamasese
1887	1889	Karonga War	African Lakes Corporation; Ngonde	Swahili; Henga
1887	1895	Hawaiian rebellions (1887–95)	Hawaiian League Republic of Hawaii; United States	Kingdom of Hawaii United States; Empire of Japan; United Kingdom; Redshirts; Hawaiian Patriotic League
1888	1893	1888–1893 Uprisings of Hazaras	Emirate of Afghanistan	Hazaras
1888	1888	Sikkim Expedition	British Empire	Tibet
1888	1889	Abushiri Revolt	German Empire	Rebels led by Abushiri ibn Salim al-Harthi
1889	1890	Chin-Lushai Expedition	British Raj	Chin and Lushai tribes
1889	1890	Ammiyya	Syrian Peasants	Syrian Sheikhs
1889	1893	Johnson County War	(United States) Homesteaders	(United States) Cattle Barons

== 1890–1899 ==
Start	Finish	Name of conflict	Belligerents	
Start	Finish	Name of conflict	Victorious party (if applicable)	Defeated party (if applicable)
Late 19th century	Late 19th century	Qu'aiti–Kathiri conflict over Mukalla	Qu'aiti Supported by: British Empire	Kathiri
1890	1895	Lushai Rising	British Raj	Lushai tribes
1890s	1890s	1890s Hamawand revolts	Ottoman Empire	Hamawand rebels
1890	1890	Edi Expedition	Dutch Empire	Acehese Rebels
1890	1890	Revolution of the Park	Argentina	Civic Union
1890	1890	First Franco-Dahomean War	Kingdom of Porto-Novo (France) French Third Republic	Kingdom of Dahomey
1890	1916	Castaic Range War	(United States) William Willoby Jenkins (United States) Los Angeles Rangers	(United States) William C. Chormicle
1895	1900	Colorado Range War	(United States) Cattle Barons	(United States) Homesteader and Rustlers
1890	1891	Ghost Dance War		Sioux tribes
1891	1891	Battle of Mulayda	Jabal Shammar	Najd
1891	1891	Yemeni Rebellion of 1891 Part of the Yemeni–Ottoman Conflicts	Ottoman Empire	Zaidis
1891	1891	Hunza-Nagar Campaign	British Raj	Hunza; Nagar
1891	1891	Anglo-Manipur War	British Raj	Kingdom of Manipur
1891	1891	Chilean Civil War of 1891	Congressist Junta Navy of Chile	Republic of Chile; Army of Chile
1891	1892	Tomochic Rebellion	Mexico	Rebels
1891	1893	Garza Revolution	Mexico; United States	Garzistas
1891	1894	Semantan War	British Empire	Malay rebels
1891	1907	Bafut Wars	German Empire	Fondom of Bafut
1892	1892	Second Hazara Uprising	Emirate of Afghanistan	Hazaras
1892	1894	Second Franco-Dahomean War	France	Kingdom of Dahomey
1892	1894	Congo–Arab War	Congo Free State	Zanzibari Arab Slave traders
1893	1893	Third Hazara Uprising	Emirate of Afghanistan	Hazaras
1893	1893	Battle of Al Wajbah	Al Thani; Allied Tribes	Ottoman Empire
1893	1893	Franco-Siamese conflict	France; French Indochina	Siam
1893	1908	Macedonian Struggle	Hellenic Macedonian Committee Ethniki Etaireia (from 1894) Internal Macedonian Revolutionary Organization; Supreme Macedonian-Adrianople Committee (from 1895 to 1905); Bulgarian Secret Revolutionary Brotherhood (from 1899); Boatmen of Thessaloniki (from 1900 to 1903) Serbian Chetnik Organization (from 1903)	Ottoman Empire
1893	1893	Conquest of the Bornu Empire	Rabih az-Zubayr's Empire	Bornu Empire
1893	1894	First Melillan campaign	Spain	Morocco
1893	1894	First Matabele War	British South Africa Company; Tswana	Ndebele (Matabele) kingdom
1893	1894	Revolta da Armada	Brazil	Brazilian navy mutineers
1893	1895	Federalist Revolution	Brazil	Federalist Rebels; National Party
1894	1895	Peruvian civil war of 1894–1895	Rebels	Government of Peru
1894	1894	Malaboch War	South African Republic	Bahananwa people
1894	1894	1894 Sasun rebellion	Ottoman Empire	Armenian rebels
1894	1894	Revolution of the 44	Salvadoran Rebels	Salvadoran Government
1894	1894	Donghak Peasant Revolution	(Korea) Joseon dynasty Empire of Japan	Donghak army
1894	1895	First Sino-Japanese War	Empire of Japan	Qing Empire
1894	1895	Second Madagascar expedition	France	Merina Kingdom
1894	1897	Jandamarra Guerilla War	British Empire	Australian aborigines
1894	1900	Mat Salleh Rebellion	British Empire	Malay rebels
1895	1895	Japanese invasion of Taiwan (1895)	Empire of Japan	Republic of Formosa; Various militia forces
1895	1896	Dungan revolt (1895–96)	China	Muslim rebels
1895	1896	Zeitun Rebellion (1895–96)	Armenian rebels	Ottoman Empire
1895	1897	Menalamba rebellion	France	Menalamba rebels
1895	1896	Fourth Anglo-Ashanti War	United Kingdom	Ashanti Empire
1895	1896	First Italo-Ethiopian War	Ethiopia	Kingdom of Italy
1895	1898	Cuban War of Independence	Cuban rebels United States	Kingdom of Spain
1896	1897	1896–1897 Greek Macedonian rebellion	Ottoman Empire	Rebels
1896	1896	Defense of Van (1896)	Ottoman Empire	Armenian rebels
1896	1896	Khaua-Mbandjeru Rebellion	German Empire	Mbandjeru; Khaua Mbandjeru
1896	1896	Anglo-Zanzibar War The shortest war in history	British Empire	Zanzibar
1896	1897	War of Canudos	Brazil	Canudos inhabitants
1896	1897	Langeberg Rebellion	Cape Colony	Batlhaping rebels
1896	1897	Batetela Rebellion	Congo Free State	Tetela rebels
1896	1897	Second Matabele War	British South Africa Company	Ndebele (Matabele) people Shona (Mashona) people
1896	1898	Philippine Revolution	Katipunan Sovereign Tagalog Nation; First Philippine Republic; United States	Kingdom of Spain
1897	1897	Greco-Turkish War (1897) The Thirty Days' War	Ottoman Empire	Kingdom of Greece
1897	1897	Revolution of 1897	Colorados	Blancos
1897	1897	Intentona de Yauco	Spain	Puerto Rican Rebels
1897	1897	Benin Expedition of 1897	British Empire	Kingdom of Benin
1897	1898	The Great Frontier Revolt: Malakand Uprising; Waziristan Expedition; Tirah Campaign; Mohmand Revolt	United Kingdom	Pashtun tribes of Afghanistan
1898	1898	1898 Baloch uprising		
1898	1898	Andijan uprising of 1898	Russian Empire	Kokand Khanate Loyalists
1898	1898	Spanish–American War	United States Cuba; First Philippine Republic; Katipunan	Kingdom of Spain
1898	1898	Negros Revolution	Katipunan Negrense Revolutionaries	Kingdom of Spain
1898	1899	Federal Revolution of 1899	Liberal Party	Conservative Party
1898	1899	Second Samoan Civil War	Samoa	(Samoa) Mata'afans
1898	1898	1898 Baloch uprising	British Empire	Rebels under Mir Baloch Khan and Mir Mehrab Khan Nausherwani
1898	1900	Voulet-Chanoine Mission	France	Rabih az-Zubayr's Empire
1899	1901	Rabih War	France Kingdom of Baguirmi	Rabih's empire
1899	1902	(See Battle of Maroua–Miskin)	German Empire: German Kamerun	Adamawa Emirate
1899	1901	Boxer Rebellion	Eight-Nation Alliance Empire of Japan; Russian Empire; British Empire; France; United States; German Empire; Kingdom of Italy; Austria-Hungary; Netherlands; Belgium; Spain	Righteous Harmony Society China
1899	1902	Second Boer War	British Empire: Cape Colony; Natal Colony; British India; Australia; Canada; New Zealand	Orange Free State South African Republic; Foreign volunteers
1899	1902	Thousand Days' War	Colombian Conservative Party	Colombian Liberal Party
1899	1902 (Malvar surrender); 1913 (Irreconcilables active)	Philippine–American War	United States Philippine Constabulary; Philippine Scouts	First Philippine Republic Katipunan (Philippines) Pulajanes; Sultanate of Sulu (Philippines) Moro people
1899	1903	Acre War	Brazil; Republic of Acre	Bolivia
