= Belogradchik rebellion (1836) =

Rebellion in the Ottoman Empire

The Belogradchik rebellion broke out in the Belogradchik nahiya, part of the Ottoman Empire, on 6 August 1836, and lasted for 4–5 days. It was planned in Knjaževac (formerly Gurgusovac) in the Principality of Serbia and included participants from Serbia. That year there were also rebellions in nearby Pirot and in Berkovitsa.

== Sources ==
- Stojančević, Vladimir (1953). "Кнез Милош и Белограчичка буна 1836. године". Историјски часопис. 3. Istorijski institut: 131–140.
