= Zeferina =

Afro-Brazilian leader of a slave revolt

- Born: Portuguese West Africa
- Military career
- Battle: Revolt of Quilombo do Urubu
- Criminal information
- Penalty: Forced labor

Zeferina (fl. 1826) was a female leader of an 1826 slave revolt, the Revolt of Quilombo do Urubu, outside Salvador, Bahia.

== Early life and enslavement ==
Zeferina was originally from Angola, but was brought to Brazil as a slave.

== Revolt of Quilombo do Urubu ==
In Piraja, in the outskirts of Salvador in Bahia, fugitive slaves and indigenous Tupinamba created a community in the woods called the Quilombo do Urubu. They grew their own food and performed candomble rituals. From here, they conducted constant offensives to free enslaved people. One of the leaders of a December 1826 revolt was Zeferina. On December 15, the rebels captured a village in Cabula, a neighboring district to Piraja. On December 17, thirty soldiers from Salvador were sent to put down the rebellion. Armed with "bows and arrows, knives, pitchforks, hatchets and spears," the rebels won the first engagement with the soldiers. However, when reinforcements arrived, the rebels were defeated.

=== Capture ===
After being arrested, Zeferina was forced to confess the nature of the rebels' plans. Afterwards, she, along with another leader named Antonio, was condemned to forced labor for her role in the uprising.

== In popular culture ==
Brazilian artist Dalton Paula's painting Zeferina depicts her.

== See also ==
- Slave revolts in Brazil

== Bibliography ==
- Reis, João José (1988). "Slave Resistance in Brazil: Bahia, 1807-1835". Luso-Brazilian Review. 25 (1): 111–144. ISSN 0024-7413. JSTOR 3513114.
