= Stevan Stojanović (military) =

Serbian military commander

Stevan Stojanović (Serbian Cyrillic: Стеван Стојановић; fl. 1833–37) or Stefan Stojanović (Стефан Стојановић), nicknamed Ćosa (Ћоса), was a Serbian military commander, a colonel (pukovnik) by rank. As the commander of the Danube–Timok Army (fl. 1836), he reported to Serbian Prince Miloš Obrenović about events in the bordering areas in the Ottoman Empire. He was sent together with minister Avram Petronijević to Knjaževac in early May 1836 to negotiate the return of refugees from Pirot that had fled Ottoman oppression. Despite talks, the Pirot area villagers, rallied by their priests, rose up (24 May–early June 1836). At the end of 1836, Stojanović made a detailed report regarding military matters of the Serbian–Ottoman border.

== Sources ==
- Milićević, Milan Đuro (1884). Kraljevina Srbija. Beograd: Državna štamparija.
- Stojančević, Vladimir (1957). "Пиротска буна 1836 године". Knez Miloš i Istočna Srbija: 1833-1838. Naučno delo. pp. 186–195.
- Janković, Zorica (2008). Цару на диван: сусрети српских владара и турских султана. Београд. pp. 55–56. ISBN 9788675191049.
