= Pasoemah Expedition =

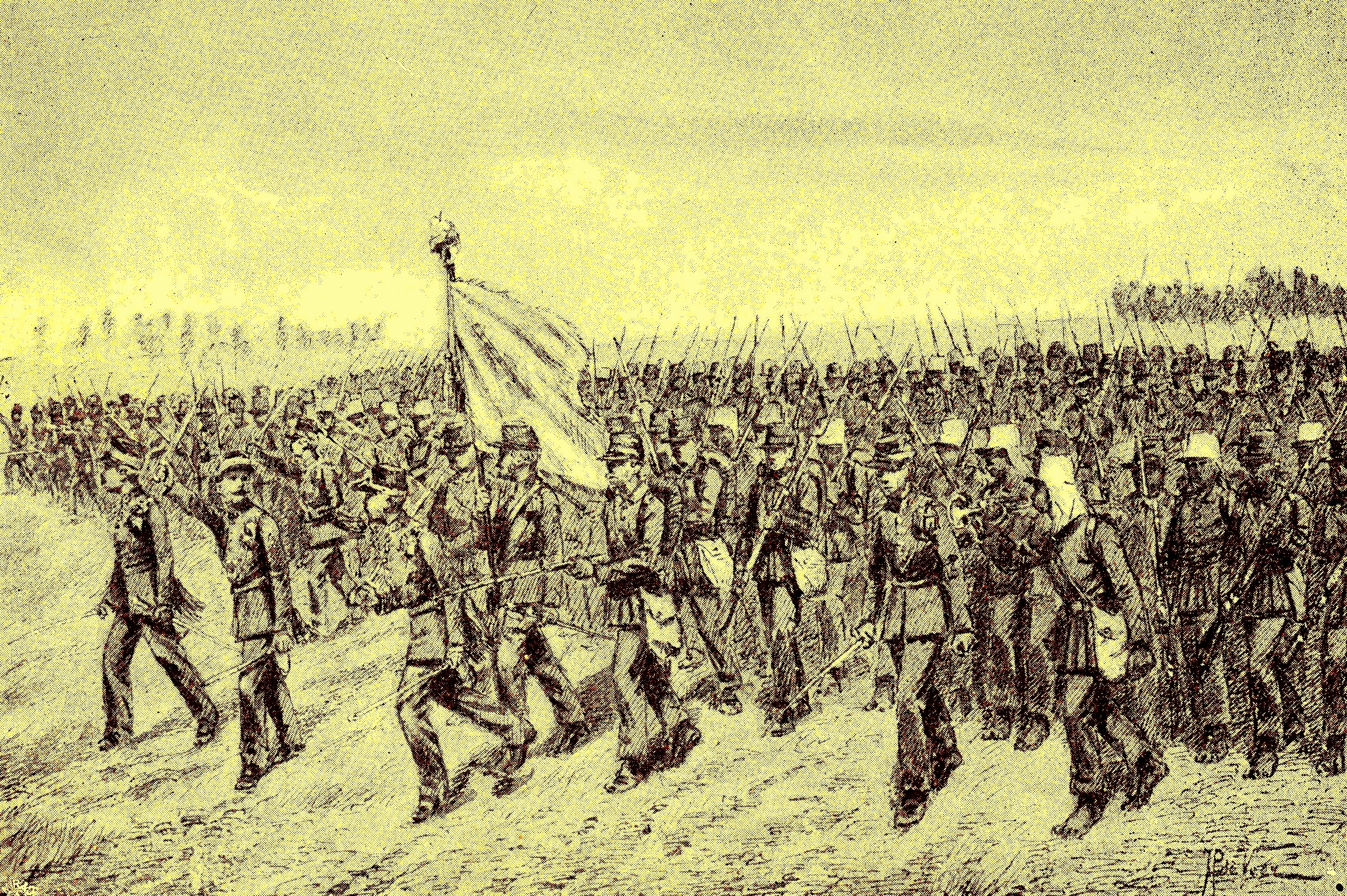
KNIL troops at Penandingan.

The Pasoemah Expedition was a punitive expedition of the Royal Netherlands East Indies Army to the Pasoemah (now spelt Pasumah or Pasemah) plateau region in South Sumatra. The expedition lasted from 1864 to 1868.

== Sources ==
- 1900. W.A. Terwogt. Het land van Jan Pieterszoon Coen. Geschiedenis van de Nederlanders in oost-Indië. P. Geerts. Hoorn
- 1900. G. Kepper. Wapenfeiten van het Nederlands Indische Leger; 1816-1900. M.M. Cuvee, Den Haag.'
- 1876. A.J.A. Gerlach. Nederlandse heldenfeiten in Oost Indë. Drie delen. Gebroeders Belinfante, Den Haag.
