= La Genuina =

Venezuelan uprising

- Part of the Venezuelan civil wars
Date	September – 16 October 1867
Location	Venezuela
Result	Peace agreement and pardon

Belligerents
Conservative rebels	Liberal government

Commanders and leaders
Luciano Mendoza; Miguel Antonio Rojas; Pedro Arana; Natividad Mendoza	Juan Crisóstomo Falcón; Pedro Manuel Rojas; José Loreto Arismendi; José Eusebio Acosta; Justo Valles; Vidal Rebolledo

La Genuina (Spanish: "The Genuine") was a military uprising in Venezuela, led by General Luciano Mendoza. It took place in Bolívar state in September 1867, and was held against Juan Crisóstomo Falcón. He was followed by General Miguel Antonio Rojas in Aragua State and also by Pedro Arana in Carabobo State.

== Response and suppression ==
Falcón responded by sending his generals to suppress the uprising – Pedro Manuel Rojas to the south-east and José Loreto Arismendi and José Eusebio Acosta to the east. Manuel Ezequiel Bruzual was placed in charge of the General Staff. The original uprising was finally suppressed at Cerro La Esperanza, in Petare, by the government's General Justo Valles and General Vidal Rebolledo, forcing the other rebels to limit themselves to guerrilla activity. On 16 October, Blanco Guzmán negotiated a peace agreement with Mendoza. Two days later a pardon was delivered.

== See also ==
- Federal War
