= Edi Expedition =

Dutch colonial expedition

The Edi expedition (Dutch: Edi-expeditie; Indonesian: Ekspedisi Idi) was an 1890 Dutch colonial expedition to Edi, a small state on the east coast of Aceh (now Kuala Idi Cut, East Aceh, Sumatra, Indonesia).

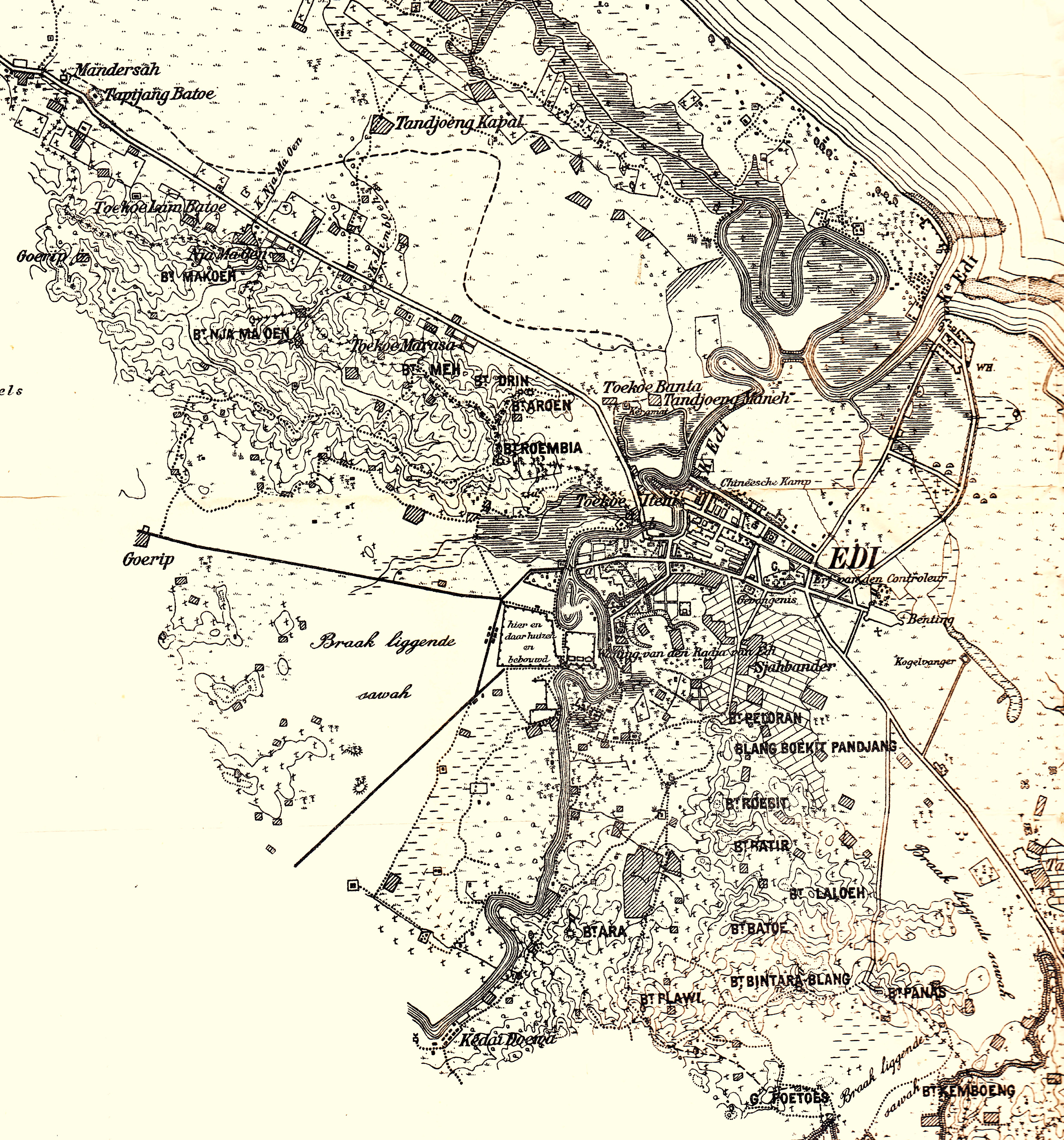
Map of Edi (Idi) and surrounds.

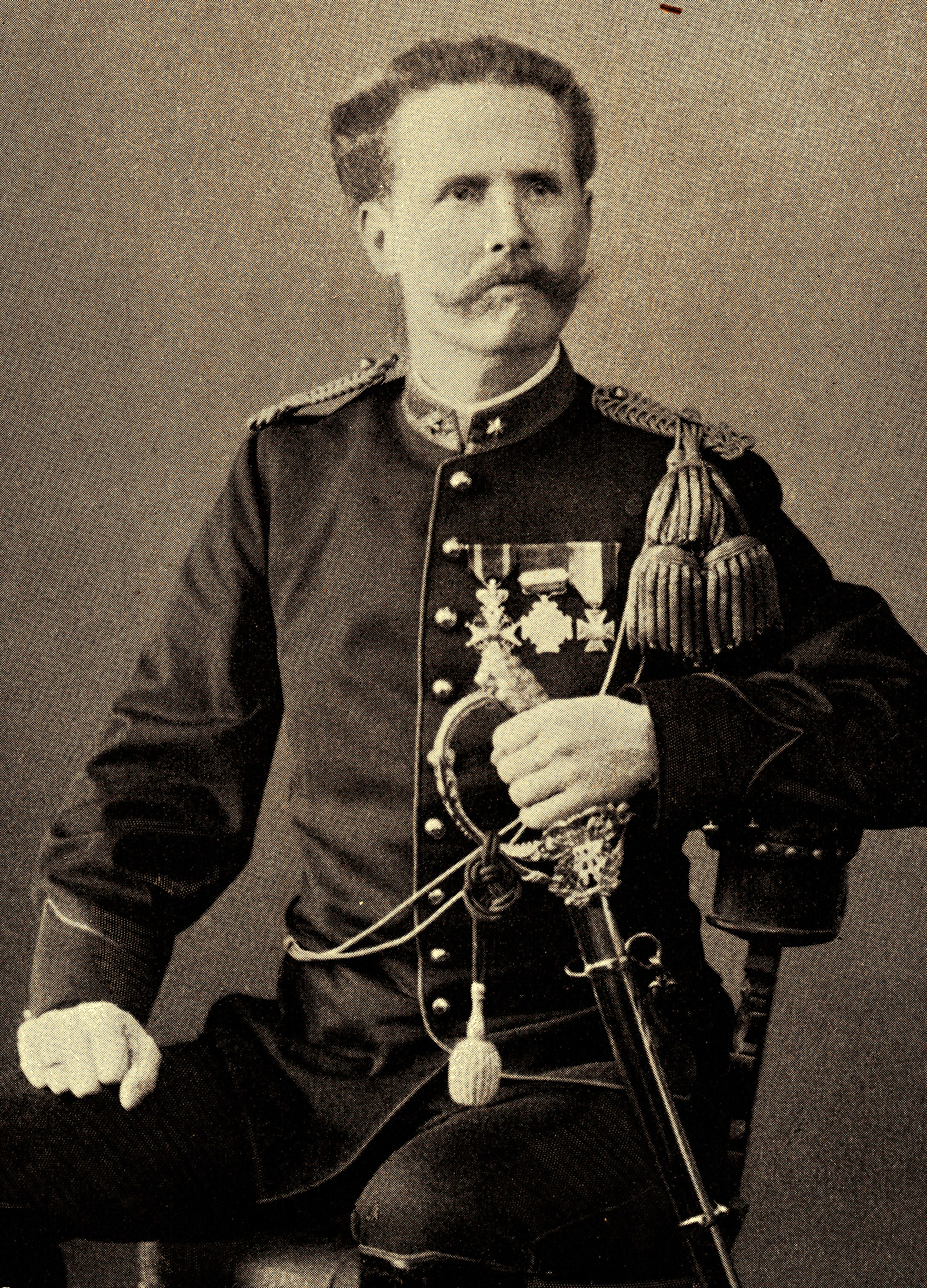
Militaire commandant en kapitein der infanterie H.F.C. van Bijlevelt.

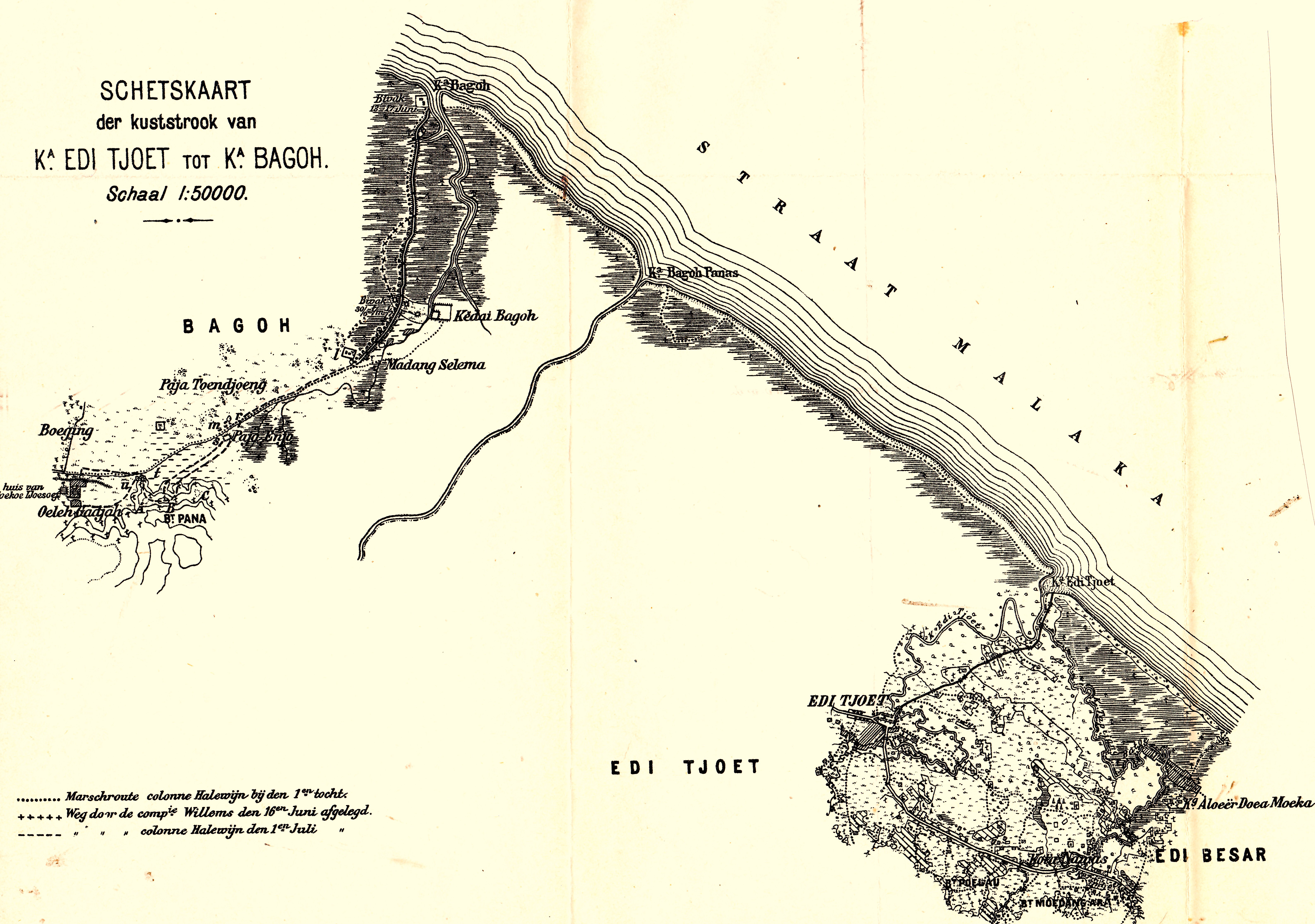
Schetskaart van de kuststrook van Edi Tjoet tot Bagoh.

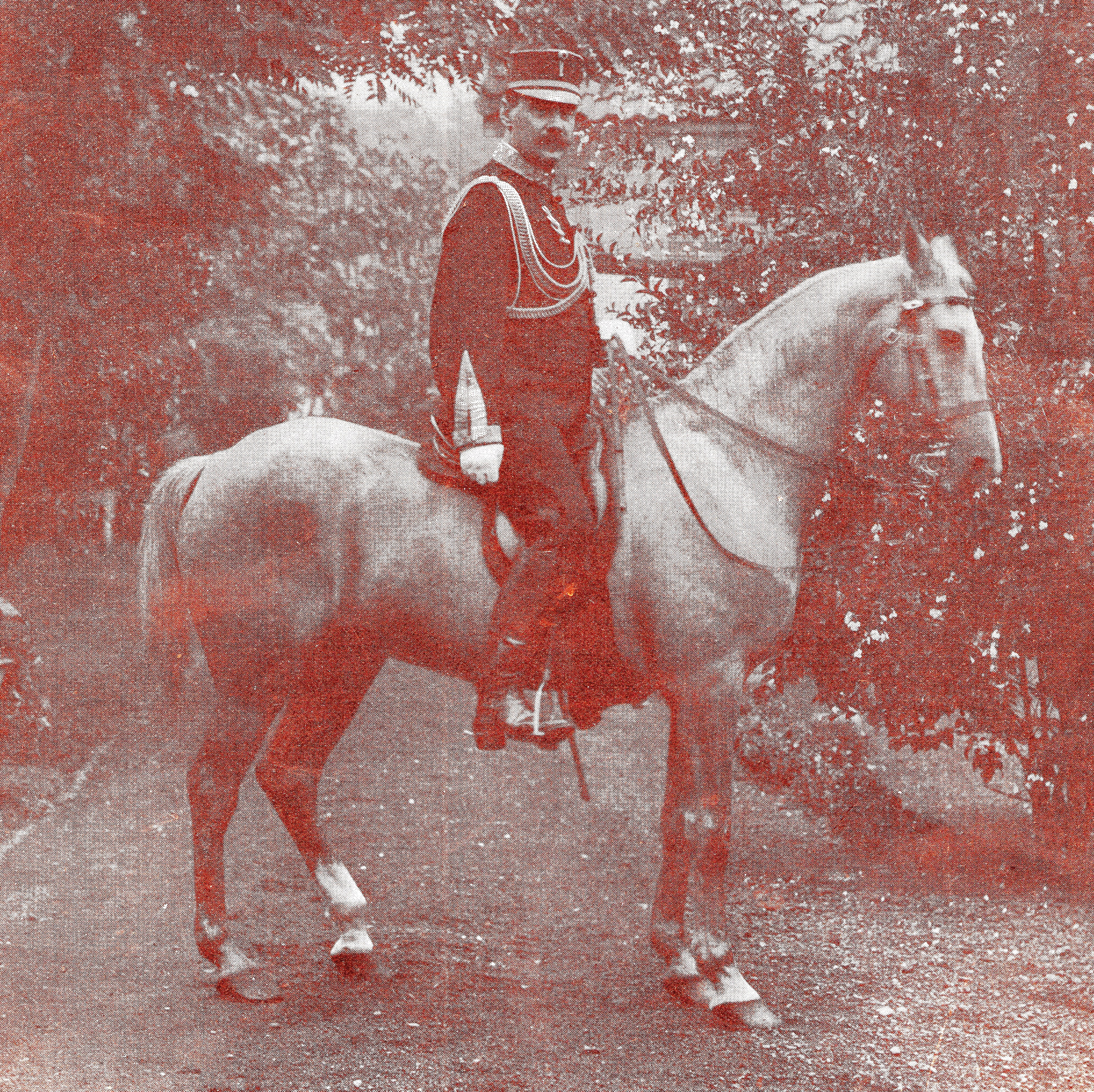
Commandant der expeditionaire artillerie M.B. Rost van Tonningen.

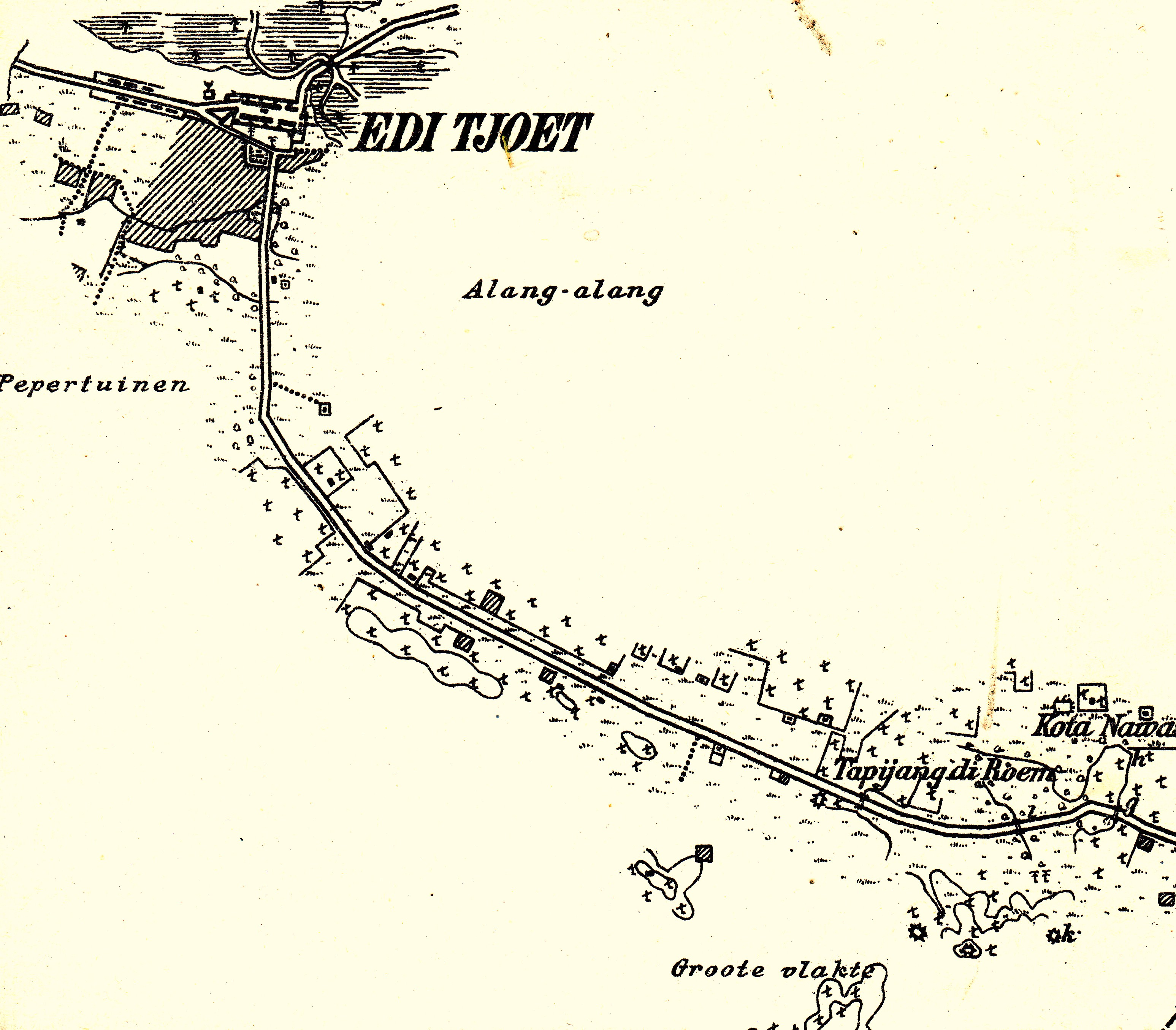
Schetskaart van Edi Tjoet.

== Sources ==
- 1891. De Edi-expeditie van 1890. Indisch Militair Tijdschrift II. Bladzijde 285-403.
