= 1867 Macedonian rebellion =

Event

1867 Macedonian Rebellion
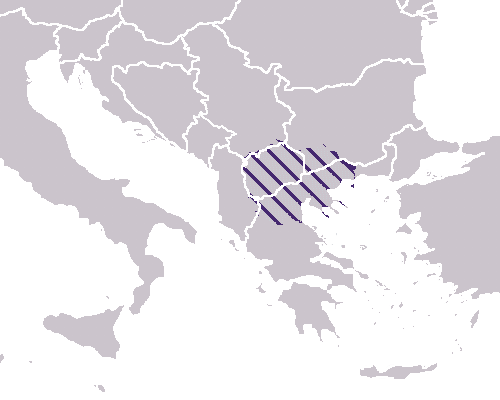
- Ottoman region of Macedonia
Date	1866–1867
Location	Ottoman Macedonia: Sanjak of Salonica; Sanjak of Monastir; Sanjak of Serfiğe
Result	Ottoman victory

Belligerents
Greek Revolutionaries	Ottoman Empire

Commanders and leaders
Naoum Kyrou; A. Kordistas; Naoum Konstantinidis; Nikolaos Pinis; Nikolaos Dalipis; Stefanos Dalipis	Unknown

Casualties and losses
Unknown	Unknown

The 1867 Macedonian Rebellion (Greek: Μακεδονική επανάσταση του 1867) was a Greek rebellion which aimed at resisting against the arbitrariness of the local Ottoman dynasts, asserting the rights of the Macedonian Greeks in the area, as well as indirect aiding the already ongoing Cretan Revolt.

The rebellion took place mainly in the area of Western Macedonia and it peaked with the capture of Mariovo and its proclamation as "Free Greece".

== Background ==
In 1866 the Great Cretan Revolution broke out. Simultaneously there appear other revolutionary bases throughout the Greek-inhabited Ottoman Empire, like Thessaly, Epirus. At the end of April 1866, Leonidas Voulgaris disembarked on Ormylia in Chalkidiki, at the head of an armed force, and united with the local fighters under captain Georgios from the Mademochoria. The activities of this force ended on June of the same year because of the quick response of the powerful Ottoman forces garrisoned in the area, after the Greek government itself notified the Ottoman authorities to avoid a diplomatic incident. In Western Macedonia and specifically in Monastir, which was the center of Greek culture in the area, operated a nationalist association called "Kazino", since 1852. Revolutionary brewings started in 1866 because of the Cretan Revolution and various armed groups, under Greek Macedonian leaders, entered Macedonia from Greece in this period.

In 1867 the "New Filiki Etaireia" was founded in Monastir by Greek Macedonians, such as the educator Anastasios Pichion from Ohrid, the gymnasium headmaster Nikolaos Filippidis from Monastir, the doctor Ioannis Argyropoulos from Kleisoura, Kastoria. They were joined by many others such as the Nymfaians Michael and Anastasios Tsirlis, as well as Ioannis Boutaris (great-great-grandfather of the mayor of Thessaloniki Yiannis Boutaris). The organisation aimed at the morally elevating Macedonian Hellenism and conducting revolutionary operations.

== Revolt ==
During the Cretan Revolt, the appropriate distraction was found and a coordinated revolt commenced, armed bands of Macedonian klephts who had trained on guerilla warfare for some time, in the Macedonian mountains. The most important were, Naoum Kyrou from Zelovo, A. Kordistas from Neveska, Nikolaos Pinis (also known as Kole Pinas) from Flampouro, brothers Nikolaos and Stefanos Dalipis from Sfika, Naoum Konstantinidis (Orlinis) from Ieropigi, Kastoria and his lieutenant Naidos, Arkoudas, Giaresis and others.

After continuous battles with Ottoman forces in the area, they managed to take control of the area of Mariovo, which they declared "Free Greece". The general revolt ended in fall of 1867, when the rebels withdrew because of winter, but also because of pressure from the Ottoman army. For the next two years the situation was unstable, as armed Macedonians frequently clashed with Ottoman forces. Though these actions were uncoordinated and soon the revolution ended completely.

== Aftermath ==
The outcome of the revolt was predetermined, as the rebels were isolated in Western Macedonia, surrounded by significant numbers of Ottoman troops. Already since the summer of 1867 the revolutionary cells in Thessaly and Epirus had been suppressed and there was no prospect of aid from the Kingdom of Greece. Greece offered no help, and soon the revolt was crushed. What it managed to do however was to rouse Macedonian Hellenism and create a new lot of rebels, who had to become klephts in the mountains, in order to survive. Therefore, a significant reserve of fighters was created who would come to be useful in the future.

== Bibliography ==
- Ioannes Cholevas, The Slavophone Greeks of Macedonia, Athens, Resos Publications, 1991, republication: Pelasgos, ISBN 9789605220204, 1999
