= Slave revolts in Brazil =

There were significant slave revolts in Brazil in 1798, 1807, 1814 and the Malê Revolt of 1835. The institution of slavery was essential to the export agriculture and mining industries in colonial Brazil, its major sources of revenue. A marked decrease in the indigenous population due to disease necessitated the importation of slaves early in the colonial history of Brazil with African slaves already being enslaved in greater amounts than indigenous slaves on sugar plantations in the Bahia region by the end of the 1500s. A gold and diamond boom in the interior of Brazil in the mid-eighteenth century precipitated a significant increase in the importation of African slaves.

The conditions of slavery in Brazil varied by region and form of labor. For instance, in sugar plantations in the Bahia region, African slaves were treated and fed poorly and worked as hard as possible because the profit gained from this method outweighed the profit lost from a slave with a short life span. In the mountainous mining region of Minas Gerais, while the work was arduous, slaves were valued more and allowed some autonomy.

Slave revolts were rare events. The most common form of slave resistance was instead the formation of fugitive settlements known as Quilombos, or macobos. Usually inhabited by those of varying African descents, the physical layout and social aspects of these communities represented a fusion of African and Brazilian practices. Existing most prevalently in the Bahia and Minas Gerais regions, as well as in the remote frontier region of Alagoas, where the largest and most famous quilombo, Palmeres, existed, just as slave conditions varied in these regions, the reason for the prevalence of fugitive slaves in these regions also varied. They were most often not self-sufficient, depending on theft and raiding from other slaves, free blacks, and whites for survival.

== Religion, Society, and Slavery ==
The goal of converting all indigenous people to Catholic faith and practices was used by the Portuguese crown to justify the colonization of Brazil. The Jesuits, arriving in Brazil in the mid-sixteenth century, were tasked with these conversions and continued to be the most prevalent and economically powerful denomination in Brazil until they were expelled in the 1700s. Indigenous people were not viewed in the eyes of the Jesuits and the Portuguese Crown as slaves by nature but rather should only become "captives" to be used for slavery through a "just war". However, due to the demands of the landowning class who depended on slave labor and whom was more powerful compared to in Spanish-America, this view was oftentimes not adhered to in colonial policy. Jesuit Priest Padre Antonio Vieira's sermons reflect these views, suggesting that enslaving indigenous people who were not captured in this manner was a sin and that they should be paid a wage. African slaves were viewed as inherently different to the indigenous as evidenced by Vieira, who stated to an audience of African slaves, "...it is by God's particular providence that you live at present as slaves and captives, so that... you will very easily reach eternal freedom."

The social hierarchy, similarly, was racially based. Portuguese immigrants, and native born whites stood at the top of this hierarchy and held the most wealth and power. Both indigenous people and blacks were the poorest in society but with a decline in the indigenous population due to disease as well as their movement into the frontier, African slaves and free blacks constituted the majority of the bottom tier. Mixed populations fulfilled social and economic roles in between. Especially prevalent and important in the skilled labor force were mixed white and black people. Of course, there was also always exceptions to this stratification.

=== Quilombos in Resistance and Revolt ===
There is limited evidence regarding whether the inhabitants of fugitive communities intended to attack the institution of slavery itself. One scholar Stuart Schwartz suggests, based on surviving evidence from multiple quilombos that “...in general the goals of the fugitive communities seem to have been the more immediate and practical ones of survival beyond the control of white society.” This is evidenced in part by the fact that they stole not only from whites but also from other slaves and free blacks.

Although almost all the slave rebellions had been designed and executed through the quilombo community, the more preeminent threats they presented in the view of colonial officials included that they "endangered towns, disrupted production, and cut lines of communication of travel" as well as attracted those who were currently enslaved, thus threatening the institution of slavery itself. Colonial officials viewed these as serious threats given Brazil's economic dependence on slaves and took measures to mobilized the indigenous and free blacks to destroy these settlements, re-enslaving or killing its inhabitants. Indigenous people, however, were often "the best potential allies" to fugitive slaves.

== Revolts ==
=== 1798 ===
The Revolt of the Alfaiates in 1798, also called the Bahian Conspiracy and Revolt of the Tailors (after the trade of many of the leaders) and recently also called Revolt of Buzios, was a slave rebellion in the then Captaincy of Bahia, in the State of Brazil. Unlike the Inconfidência Mineira of 1789, it was a separatist movement with a popular base and extensive black participation. Both were largely inspired by the French Revolution. The leaders who were prosecuted were mostly free mulattos, but a second group of wealthier whites who encouraged the revolt were not prosecuted.

The objectives of the rebelling baianos were, according to Clóvis Moura, "much more radical," and the proposal to liberate the slaves was one of the main goals. Its leaders and members included "freed blacks, black slaves, pardo slaves, freed pardos, artisans, tailors; those who were from the most oppressed or discriminated classes of Bahia colonial society". With many slaves living in Bahia, the probability of revolts and rebellions ran high. The elites of the area were frightened that if rebellion or revolts did happen, they would be similar to the Haitian Revolution. Because of the significant participation of Bahia's lower classes, the revolt has also been called “The First Brazilian Social Revolution”.

=== 1807 ===
In 1807, slaves were planning a revolt that would take place on May 28, during Corpus Christi celebrations. Six days before the revolt would take place they were betrayed by a slave loyal to his master. The master went to the governor and he was skeptical about the situation. However, he sent his spies out into the community and he learned that a subversive plan was real and growing stronger as the 28th approached. A day before the rebellion took place the governor had mounted specific patrols in the city. With its exits and entrances under surveillance, and rural officers on the roads, the house that was the center of the planning was surrounded and searched.

After being searched the alleged leaders and captains were taken prisoner. Many weapons were confiscated from the house, such as: four hundred arrows, a bundle of rods to be used as bows, piles of rope, knives, and one shotgun.

Rural officers caught three of the ringleaders who had fled earlier that afternoon, and military patrols on rounds caught a few more identified as agents or enticers.

The goal of the uprising is believed to have been to capture ships in the harbor and make a massive flight back to Africa.

=== 1814 ===
The rebellion of 1814 overshadowed the previous ones in numbers of participants and violence. Starting on February 28, slave fishermen began to burn down part of the harbor, killing the foreman and most of his family. The rebels proceeded to head to the village of Itapoan.

Resistance was met when they were trying to leave to go the next village. Troops from Salvador then encountered a bloody battle with the rebels, which left the rebels with fifty fewer men.

Four of the captured slaves were hanged in public and twelve were deported to Portuguese colonies in Africa.

=== 1835 ===
The Muslim Slave revolt in 1835 began January 24, 1835 by rebellion organizers, Malês, or Muslim Africans. The revolt took place in the streets of Salvador and lasted for three hours. During that time seventy people were killed and a report of more than five hundred were sentenced to death, in prison, whipped or deported. Reis argues that if you bring these numbers into today's times, with Salvador being 1.5 million, over twelve thousand people would be sentenced to some form of punishment. Within these hearings, Africans spoke out about their rebellion as well as about their cultural, social, religious and domestic lives. The testimonies from court and the oppressors’ descriptions of these Africans that were enslaved brought out “priceless testimonies” of African culture with the Americas.

== Families ==
In 1778, José da Lisboa wrote, “Because of the obvious benefits accruing from male labor over female, there are always three times as many males as females among the slave population, which perpetuates the pattern of their failure to propagate as well as their failure to increase in number from generation to generation.” Native born slaves populations was slightly higher women to men, 100:92, whereas the Africans that were not born in Brazil were a little less 100:125, women to men. Also what was interesting was how the African men “vied” for the African woman and the formations of African families was extremely dissatisfactory and limiting even among free Blacks. In terms of the relationships in Bahia there were not a lot of married couples, “As one might expect, slaves had scant opportunities for affectionate relationships either episodic or long lasting. More than 27 percent claimed to be bachelors, and that number could be raised to 98 percent if we considered those whose marital status is not known to have been single.”

== See also ==
- Islam in Brazil
- Zeferina, female fugitive slave who led a revolt in 1826
