= Yemeni–Ottoman conflicts =

Series of conflicts between the Ottoman Empire and Zaidi tribes in Upper Yemen

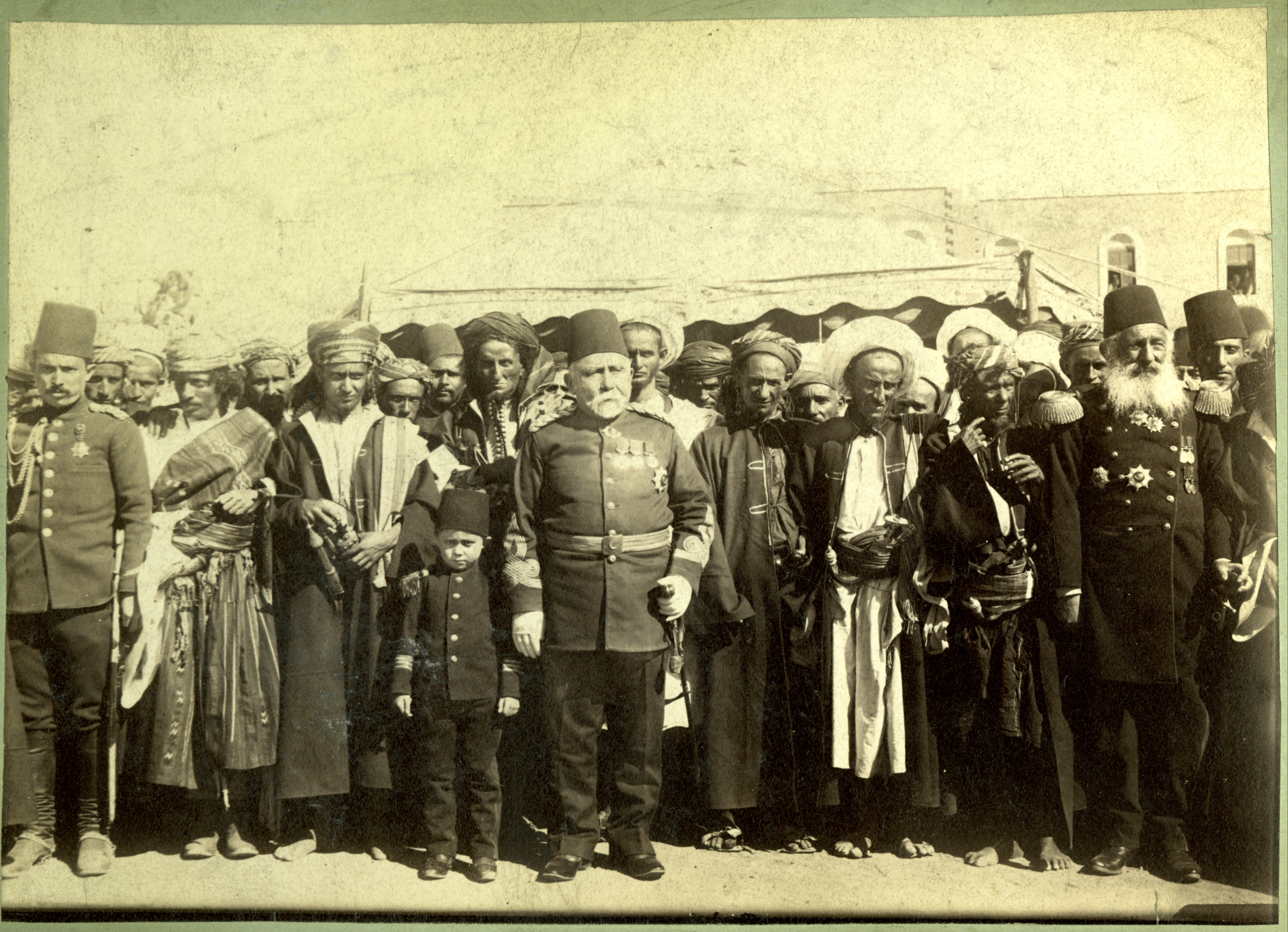
Ottoman soldiers with Yemeni locals

The Yemeni–Ottoman wars were a series of conflicts between the Ottoman Empire and Zaidi tribes in Upper Yemen, which began in 1538 and ended with the signing of the Treaty of Daan on 9 October 1911.

== Yemeni expedition of 1538 ==
The first Ottoman attempt to conquer Yemen occurred in 1538, after the end of Mamluk rule in Yemen following the end of the Ottoman–Mamluk War (1516–17).

The Ottomans weren't able to capture cities north of Sana'a in Upper Yemen such as Sa'dah, Shaharah and Hajjah remained in the hands of Yemeni Zaidi imams.

== Yemeni expedition of 1567-71 ==
After Mahmud Pasha was appointed as the Beylerbeyi of Egypt from Yemen in 1565, his successor Ridvan Pasha (1565–1567) reported to the Divan that he was collecting excessive taxes, and Mahmud Pasha convinced the Divan to the view that Yemen should be divided into two because of its vast territory, and prevented any possible investigation into him. According to the decision, the Sana'a Province was given to Murad Pasha, and the Yemen Province centered on Zabid was given to Hasan Pasha, and Ridvan Pasha was dismissed. Because of this administrative chaos in Yemen, the Zaydi Al-Mutahhar rebelled in 1567.

Under Sinan Pasha the Ottomans led an attack into the Zaidi Imamate after the Zaidis under Mutahhar kicked the Ottomans to only Zabid. Al Qahirah in Ta'izz would fall within 7 weeks, including the city itself Jabal Al Aghbar in Ash Shamayatayn District were attacked by Ottomans and Zaidi defenders were routed in 29 April 1569 in a battle, shortly afterwards the Ottomans took control of Aden on 14 May 1569. Ottoman forces would make their journey north to Wadi Maytam near Jibla in which a battle ensued with the Zaidi launching an ambush with 10,000 men on 12 June 1569 however Sinan's forces thwarted the Zaidi attack with the inhabitants of Jibla and nearby areas submitting to Ottoman Rule. The Ottomans would attack Ibb and the Zaidi Garrison would be defeated, taken over by the Ottomans on 25 June 1569.

The Ottoman forces entered Dhamar and Yarim in early July 1569. Sinan and his army would begin making his way to Sana’a heading north. Ottoman forces would invade Sana’a on 26 July 1569, the capital of the Zaidi State, the Ottomans would launch an attack into Khawlan, southeast of Sana’a, with the Ottomans successfully breaching it. Zaidi forces including Mutahhar, the leader of the Zaidi state, was stationed in defense in Thula.

Ottoman forces would then attack Shibam near Kawkaban, taking over the city on 24 August 1569.

== Yemeni expedition of the 1630s ==
Another Ottoman attempt to conquer Yemen occurred in the 1630s. However, this expedition ended in a decisive victory for the Yemeni Zaidi imams, and the Yemeni imams were able to extend their domains from Asir to Hadramaut.

== Muhammad Ali's Yemeni expedition ==
In the 18th century, the Zaidi State fractured, resulting in the creation of many small Yemeni states such as the Sultanate of Lahej. However, the Ottomans initially proved reluctant to try to reassert their authority in Yemen. In the 1830s, the Ottomans requested Muhammad Ali of Egypt to try to conquer the Arabian peninsula (including Yemen). However, this was met with opposition from the British Empire, which opted to occupy Aden in January 1839. In April 1840, due to pressure from Russia, Austria, and the British Empire, Muhammad Ali withdrew from the Arabian peninsula.

== Yemeni expedition of 1849 ==
In 1849, the Ottomans returned to Yemen once more. In April, they captured Al Hudaydah, and in July, they entered Sana'a on the invitation of the Imam, who wished for Yemen to become a vassal state under Ottoman protection. This decision was regarded as treacherous by locals, and soon an open revolt occurred. Soon, the Ottomans were forced to withdraw.

== Yemeni expedition of 1872 ==
In 1872, the Ottomans were invited to occupy Sana'a by local nobles who were irritated by the alleged incompetence of the Zaidi imam, allowing the Ottomans to finally conquer Yemen and establish the Yemen Vilayet.

== Yemeni rebellion of 1891 ==
In 1891, a violent rebellion occurred in Yemen, due to the irreligious conduct of the Ottoman Empire.

== Yemeni rebellion of 1904 ==
In 1904, another rebellion occurred in Yemen. While Arab historian Abdul Yaccob reports it as having started in June 1904, Caesar E. Farah reports that the first serious incident took place on 8 November, when an Ottoman garrison was attacked and destroyed at Hafash. After the attack on Hafash, Hajjah and Hajur broke out in rebellion. The rebels then occupied Dhamar and Yarim, and began marching on Taiz and Qatabah.

Within a month of the Imam's uprising, the Yemenis had blocked the road between Sana'a and the port of Hodeida, had cut telegraph wires, suspended caravans and Sana'a was reported as being besieged on 12 December. On 26 December, the rebels captured the Sinan Pasa post on the Sana'a - Hudaydah road. Turkish reinforcements found themselves repeatedly ambushed by the Yemenis, and by 1905 Ottoman casualties stood at more than 25,000. In early January, Hajjah was under siege by the rebels. On 22 February, the rebels surrounded Ibb and Qatabah. In March, the Ottomans broke the siege of Mabar after 4 days of fighting.

In March 1905, the rebels had captured Yarim, and surrounded Ibb, which they had captured by the third week of May together with Qatabah.

On 5 March, a 4,000 strong Ottoman force departed from Hudaydah to relieve the siege of Sana'a, but was unable to do so. The rebels headed for Manakhah, and laid siege to it. In early March, they captured Hajjah as thousands of Ottoman regulars surrendered. and they captured Manakhah in March.

In April 1905, the Yemenis captured Sana'a, (Note: Sana'a fell according to Abdul Yaccob. However, Caesar E. Farah says that Sana'a was not captured and that the subsequent expedition was aimed at breaking the siege.) and demanded an armistice should the Ottoman garrison be spared, which was accepted. In June 1905, negotiations ensued, but led to nothing.

== Yemeni expedition of 1905 ==
After the failure of negotiations, Ottoman forces consisting of 6 battalions led by Ahmad Faydi Pasha violated the armistice, and started a three-pronged offensive from Manakhah on 16 July 1905, and captured Sana'a on 29 or 30 August.

In July 1905, the imam of Yemen sent a letter to the Ottomans, detailing his resentment towards the violation of the armistice:

"We ousted them [the Ottomans] from Sana ... we fixed a truce for one year during which there should be no fighting and both parties should have peace without defiance or violation of the terms. When they, however, reached the place to which they had agreed to retire, they reverted to their former deeds admixed with truth and falsehood. They commenced to violate the terms they have concluded and the undertakings they had agreed to, and to commit evil."

By mid-August, the Ottomans had gained the initiative. By the end of that month, they had retaken Abha in Asir. In the south, a Unit moving from Taiz captured Yarim, while another Ottoman force under Feyzi captured Mafraq before advancing on Suq al-Khamis and then while advancing on the road to Saana occupied all positions as far as Khawlan. Feyzi reported he had captured 24 villages, including Jiblah and Badan.

By mid-November, the Ottomans had retaken Amran, Thula, Kawkaban, and Hajjah.

In mid-November, the Ottomans advanced on Shaharah with 10,000 men, in an attempt to crush the Yemeni armies, but the offensive was abandoned due to the rugged terrain and constant attacks by Yemeni forces, and they withdrew to Hajjah in December, then to Sana'a, and two weeks later to Taiz, with the Yemenis in hot pursuit. Meanwhile, the Yemeni rebels surrounded Amran, and occupied Jabal Dharwah and Al-Yaabir, and later surrounded Sana'a once again. In Hudaydah, the Ottomans regrouped, marching north and recovering control of lost areas near Manakhah. The Ottoman force linked up with another Ottoman force which had been advancing from Zaydiyah to relieve Qifl and recapture Hajjah. In the South, the Ottomans were moving north from Taiz to Yarim after recapturing Suq al-Khamis, after which the Imam offered peace if he could keep Dhamar, Yarim, Amran, Kawkaban, al-Tawilah and Hajjah.

== Zaraniq rebellion ==
The Zaraniq rebellion was a rebellion of the Zaraniq Tribe that took place between 1909 and 1910 in the Yemen Vilayet, which was then part of the Ottoman Empire.

== Conclusion and aftermath ==
In August 1906, an Ottoman delegation arrived to the Imam, expressing the desire to re-open negotiations, to which the Imam reportedly responded with by stating his desire to end the bloodshed. Five years of negotiations ensued, and ended with the signing of the Treaty of Daan on 9 October 1911, which led to Yemen becoming a vassal state of the Ottoman Empire. It was effective for 7 years, until the Imam of Yemen capitalized on the Ottoman collapse in World War I and created the Mutawakkilite Kingdom of Yemen on 30 October 1918.

== Yemeni rebellion of 1911 ==
In early 1911, the Imam, frustrated by the lack of progress in the negotiations, began another revolt against the Ottomans. Armed Yemeni rebel bands arrived in Sana'a on 12 January 1911, and soon took over the city. The rebellion collapsed near the end of April.
