= Pirot rebellion =

1836 rebellion in Ottoman Bulgaria

Pirot Rebellion
Date	24 May – early June 1836
Location	Pirot area, Sanjak of Niš, Ottoman Empire (now Serbia)
Result	Ottoman victory

Belligerents
Orthodox villagers	Ottoman Empire

Commanders and leaders
Hadži-Neša Filipović	Miloš Obrenović (final position after renegading)

Units involved
	Local Turks, Albanian irregulars, Ottoman army from Sofia and Leskovac

Strength
8,000	Unknown

The Pirot rebellion (Serbian: Пиротска буна/Pirotska buna) (Bulgarian: Пиротскo въстание) broke out in the town Pirot in Ottoman Bulgaria after the Orthodox Christian population in the area suffered oppression by the local Ottoman leader and Orthodox bishop. Refugees across the border in Serbia planned the rebellion and rose up together with villagers from the area during a scheduled meeting of the two sides agreed upon by the Serbian Prince Miloš Obrenović, the community protector, and the Vali of Rumelia. He had promised to help the rebels, but broke out his promise and remained loyal to the Ottoman Sultan. The Serbian prince suppressed the rebels and punished the fugitives.

== Background ==
In the aftermath of the Serbian Revolution (1804–17), in which several commanders from the Pirot area participated in and during which also a part of the Pirot nahiya was liberated, and the Serbian rebel army engaged the Ottomans in the vicinity of Pirot, some locals saved themselves from zulum (cruelty, oppression, persecution) and fled to the newly established Principality of Serbia. From there, some organized into hajduk bands that crossed Knjaževac (formerly Gurgusovac) into Ottoman territory. Due to the Serbian Revolution and influence of the Principality of Serbia, the Ottomans viewed suspiciously of Pirot. During the Greek Revolution (1821–29), the locals turned to Prince Miloš for aid and protection. There was a dispute between Serbia and the Ottoman Empire in 1831–34 over border demarcation in the Stara Planina area; Prince Miloš tried hard to have the western part ceded to Serbia, which failed, as the new borders were set up and held officially until 1878. In January 1835, 16 villages in Lower Ponišavlje rose up due to Ottoman zulum; the rebellion was suppressed with the mediation of Prince Miloš. The zulum continued however and a large group of villagers therefore migrated to Serbia. Another rebellion broke out in March, in which 100 rebels died; the rebellion was suppressed, again with the mediation of Prince Miloš and his minister Avram Petronijević. Pirot was a larger town, inhabited by Orthodox Christians and Muslims, estimated to have had a population of 6–8,000. It suffered greatly from plague in 1834, 1835 and 1836.

== Prelude ==
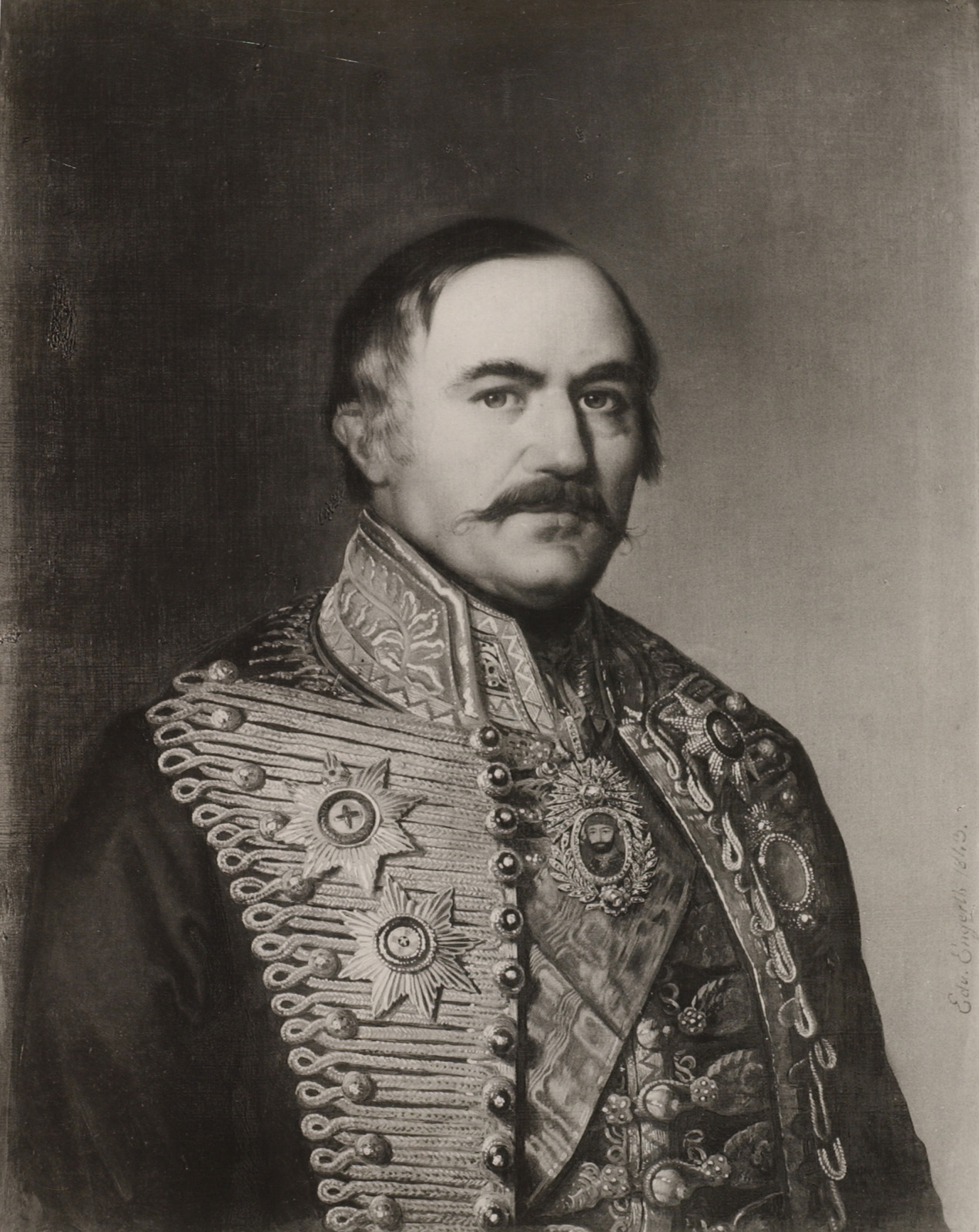
Serbian Prince Miloš Obrenović was the mediator, as protector of the Orthodox population south of Serbia, in the events surrounding the rebellion.

In 1836, the ayan (leader) in Pirot was Mahmud the Kapıcıbaşı, while the Orthodox bishop was Hieronymos, a Greek. These two acted in concert, and amerced and oppressed the population. Between 27 January and 10 April, 726 people fled to Serbia. Due to this, the community leader Hadži-Neša Filipović, a wealthy and respected man, left Pirot for Knjaževac (since 1833 part of Serbia) with a large group of people when complaints to the Vali of Rumelia at Bitola bore no fruit. At this time, relations between Serbia and Pirot were intimate. Mahmud and Hieronymos sent 17 locals to the Vali who pictured the refugees as miserable and restless people, wanting to justify themselves, and on 5 March 1836 sent Đorđe Kokal and Alija, a Turk, to Knjaževac to try to persuade the refugees to return home. The refugees at Knjaževac answered that none of them would return as long as those two leaders were present in Pirot. Distributed over the area of Knjaževac and neighbouring villages, the refugees began arming themselves and readying for a rebellion in the Pirot area. The situation became serious, as seen in the Vali of Rumelia sending a mühürdar (an Ottoman official, "seal-keeper") to Pirot, while Prince Miloš Obrenović sent his minister Avram Petronijević and the commander of the Danube-Timok army Stevan Stojanović to Knjaževac, where these two met with the mühürdar on 6 May 1836. The mühürdar had been assured of the oppression by Mahmud and Hieronymos already in Pirot, and promised in Knjaževac that the population will not suffer again, and proposed that the refugees return home with Hadži-Neša, whom the kocabaşı title, signifying the rayah chief, would be given and as such Mahmud could not do without him. Prince Miloš messaged Petronijević on 7 May, asking him to collect all refugees from Pirot and talk them into returning home, and that he together with Hadži-Neša safely bring them back to Pirot. Furthermore, Prince Miloš demanded that bishop Hieronymos and Hadji Hasan Efendi, whom ayan Mahmud blamed for everything, be banished (sürgün, exile from the region). Petronijević managed to return the larger part of the refugees back to Pirot, and informed Prince Miloš of this on 11 May. Prince Miloš sent Hadži-Neša to Pirot but stressed that if he did not feel safe, he must return to Serbia. Petronijević wrote from Pirot on 21 May that Hadži-Neša had been well-received by ayan Mahmud and the mühürdar, and that Hadži-Neša had called on some people from over the nahiya to come to Pirot in two days to discuss how to bring order and reduce poverty. Hadži-Neša had called 15–20 people from each srez (rural municipality), but the plot unraveled, and 8,000 men armed with rifles and tools rallied at Pirot on 24 May; the priests had visited all villages and raised people.

== Rebellion ==
The Turks were alarmed, and armed conflict broke out on the streets, during which Hadži-Neša was caught in the midst of a large group of villagers who had a shootout with the Turks. In the mediation between Petronijević and the mühürdar, the Turks retreated to the Pirot Fortress. The villagers did not want to scatter and remained around the town in large groups, numbering 500–1,000 each. Among these were people from the regions of Visok, Nišava and Lužnica. Those from Visok were most active. Between 25 and 28 May Petronijević tried to calm down the villagers, but to no avail, stating that "they want that no Turk remain, and that if the Turks do not leave voluntarily, they will attack the town. They say that they only wait for You to send cannons and aid, as promised to them". At the beginning of the turmoil, Prince Miloš made the Porte immediately replace ayan Mahmud, and they appointed Nektarios from Lemnos the new bishop.

Ottoman troops were sent from Sofia and Leskovac. Prince Miloš recommended that Petronijević work on calming down the rebellion and have the Albanian crew at Pirot replaced by nızamı (a westernized military corps), "Imperial people". The seriousness of the rebellion, that it threatened to "light up Turkey", is seen from Prince Miloš's letter of 31 May: "...We say this because that Pirot turmoil is very dangerous, because all of Bosnia is again in motion, and the fire has spread even to [Novi] Pazar... God forbid that it erupts from Pirot, it may combine with the Bosnian [rebellion] and Albanian [rebellion] from Pazar, and it would be a great evil, which we do not know who would [manage to] silence." On the Sunday of 29 May, in the afternoon, many villagers came to the town market, which frightened the local Turks who then took up arms. The bazaar was shut down and the Turks went towards the Tijabar neighbourhood, but the Ottoman army from Sofia kept them at the town bridge and refused them to continue. At the beginning of June, "peace and order" was restored. A number of priests were killed by the Turks during the rebellion.

The population were satisfied with the new ayan, the powerful Hadji Mehmed Bey Serezli. On 27 June, in the name of citizens of Pirot, Hadži-Neša, Hadži-Ćira Nešović, Viden Jovanović, Cvetko Teodorović, Đorđe Cenović, Mika Krstović, Stamen Caribrodski, Panajot Pop-Jović, Đorđe Jelenić, Živko Stefanović, Ćira Mladžić and Hadži-Pavle with a warm letter thanked Prince Miloš on his commitment to Pirot affairs and prayed that he would not forget them. The letter was stamped with the Pirot municipality seal, a white double-headed eagle. Prince Miloš replied on 2 July.

In August, another rebellion broke out in the Pirot area. A large group of villagers met up at the Temska monastery on 2 August, and in the evening went toward Pirot crossing the Gradašnica river. Petronijević was again sent to "calm down the rayah", and managed to have the ringleader, a Cvetko, imprisoned and persuaded the villagers to stop. Cvetko was executed on 9 August at Prince Miloš's command and put on a wheel at the Ottoman–Serbian border. It seems that Prince Miloš sought to challenge rebellion as to receive mandate from the Sultan to calm down the rebellious rayah and gain authority upon them, and towards the Porte tried to show himself as a loyal vassal as to remove any possible insinuations.

The leaders of the rebellions in Pirot were village priests.

== Aftermath ==
The Pirot municipality and district continued cordial relations and connections with Serbia and Prince Miloš. Hadži-Neša came into conflict with the new bishop Nektarios due to defending folk interest, and was therefore exiled from Pirot to Anatolia in the summer by the Ottoman government, but after Prince Miloš's intervention in September 1836 Hadži-Neša was ordered to live in Sofia (where he also died). In February 1840, Prince Mihailo Obrenović and his mother Ljubica visited Pirot on their return from Constantinople. Prince Mihailo gave refuge to hajduks from Pirot who wintered in Serbia and plundered in the Pirot area during the summers.

On 6 April 1841, a rebellion broke out around Niš, Pirot, Leskovac and Prokuplje, due to Turk zulum. It was suppressed by 10,000 Ottoman soldiers at the beginning of the summer. Pirot was liberated in the Serbian–Ottoman Wars (1876–1878) and ceded to Serbia according to the Congress of Berlin (1878).

== Assessment ==
The government of the Principality of Serbia was highly engaged in minimizing the Ottomans disapproval of the Pirot inhabitants for their large emigration to Serbia and the rebellion itself. Thanks to Prince Miloš's relations in the Porte and his influence on some of its officials, the Pirot inhabitants were saved from heavy repression. Serbian intervention led to Pirot's appointment of a local kocabaşı, amnesty, and notable improvement of tax liability and overall Serbian–Ottoman affairs.

== Annotations ==
1. It has been argued that the population of the modern Serbian–Bulgarian border districts and Macedonia lacked a national identity at that time. Bulgarian–Canadian historian Katrin Bozeva claims that the locals only had a vague idea of their national identity and were accustomed to defining themselves in terms of religion, locality and occupation, but not in terms of nationality. German historian Nenad Stefanov notes that the rebellions between 1836 and 1840 in the areas of Niš, Pirot and Belogradchik are object of contention between nationally-centered Serbian and Bulgarian historical narratives, both sides claiming them to be manifestations of respective national consciousness.
  During the Tanzimat period (1839–1876), the Sanjak of Niš was in Ottoman usage included as an area part of "Bulgaristan", and its inhabitants were called Bulgarians. Accordingly researchers like Mark Pinson describe all rebellions in the area, including the Pirot Rebellion of 1836, as uprisings of Bulgarians. A study of the Hungarian Academy of Sciences from 2015, with authors G. Demeter et al, states that contemporary Serbian newspapers and maps, designated the town of Pirot and its inhabitants as Bulgarian and as a situated outside the boundaries of the Serbian race.
  The area was ecclesiastically part of the Ecumenical Patriarchate of Constantinople. Serbian philologist and linguist Vuk Karadžić (1787–1864) regarded the speech of Pirot and neighbouring Chiprovtsi (now in Bulgaria) as part of the Serbian language, and also called on the Pirot area and close to Sofia to be ceded to Serbia (1828). Prince Miloš, when sending gifts to Hadži-Neša, called himself "Prince of the free Serbs".
2. According to Burg, David F., PhD at the University of Pennsylvania, citing Mercia MacDermott, Serbian Prince Miloš Obrenović had promised to help the Bulgarian rebels, but broke out his promise and remained loyal to the Ottoman sultan. The Serbian prince suppressed the rebels and punished the fugitives.
3. According to Nenad Stefanov, PhD in history at Humboldt University of Berlin, the rebellions between 1836 and 1840 in the area of Niš, Pirot and Belogradčik are object of contention between a nationally centered Serbian and Bulgarian historical narrative, both sides claiming they to be a manifestation of Bulgarian national consciousness or respectively loyalty of the rebels to Miloš Obrenović in a Serbian national historiography. He claims, by conceptualizing the relationship of Obrenović to the rebellion not as the protagonist of any national idea, but as one political actor, acting in this concrete context, is possible to avoid a strictly nationalist views. A lot of sources related to the activity of Prince Miloš, shows his interaction and cooperation with the Ottoman authorities, in order to restrain this revolt.

== Sources ==
Books

- Kostić, Kosta N. (1973). Istorija Pirota. Pirot: Muzej Ponišavlja. NBPI-knjige-042.
- Milićević, Milan Đuro (1884). Kraljevina Srbija. Beograd: Državna štamparija.
- Nikolić, Vladimir M. (1974). Стари Пирот. NBPI-knjige-061.
- Petrović, Svetislav (1996). Историја града Пирота. Пирот: Хемикалс. NBPI-knjige-007.
- Stojančević, Vladimir (1957). "Пиротска буна 1836 године". Knez Miloš i Istočna Srbija: 1833-1838. Naučno delo. pp. 186–195.

Journals

- Lilić, Borislava (1992). "Пиротска буна 1836. године и однос кнеза Милоша према пограничним крајевима". Пиротски зборник. 17–18: 9–20.
- Lilić, Borislava (1994). "Пирот у плановима српских националних организација за ослобођење од турске власти у XIX веку". Пиротски зборник. 19–20: 9–20.
- Nedeljković, Slaviša (2014). "Društveni i agrarno-pravni položaj srpskog naroda u niškom pašaluku u prvim decenijama 19. veka" [Social and agrarian-legal status of the Serbian people in the Niš Pashaluk in the early decades of the 19th century] (PDF). Teme (3): 1349–1363.
- Pejčić, Miodrag (1981). "Hadži-Nešina buna i kuga u Pirotu 1836—1837. godine" [Hadži-Neša's Rising and the Plague in Pirot in 1836—1837]. Srpski Arhiv Za Celokupnu Lekarstvo. 109 (9). Beograd: 1223–1232.
- Stojančević, Vladimir (1977). "Пироћанци и пиротски крај у национално ослободилачком покрету српског народа у XIX веку". Пиротски зборник. 8–9: 3–14.
- Stojančević, Vladimir (1998). "Настојања Србије да се ослободи Стара планина у XIX веку". Пиротски зборник. 23–24: 17–19.

Symposia

- Lilić, Borislava, ed. (1997). "Pirotska buna 1836: sa posebnim osvrtom na oslobodilački pokret u Pirotu i Ponišavlju od turskog osvajanja do oslobođenja 1877/78". Zbornik radova: Naučni skup, Pirot, 14-16. Juni 1996. Pirot: Naša sloboda.

== See also ==
- Berkovitsa Rebellion (1836)
- Belogradchik Rebellion (1836)
- Niš Rebellion (1841)
