= Berkovitsa rebellion (1836) =

- Part of the Bulgarian–Ottoman wars
Date	1836
Location	Berkovitsa, Bulgaria
Result	Disputed

Belligerents
Bulgarian rebels	Ottoman Empire

Commanders and leaders
Mancho Punin	Şerif Mehmed

Strength
4,000	Unknown

Casualties and losses
Unknown	Unknown

The Berkovitsa rebellion or Mancho's rebellion (Bulgarian: Манчова буна, Манчова размирица) broke out in the Berkovitsa (Turkish: Berkofce) nahiya, part of the Ottoman Empire, on 7 May 1836. It was led by Mancho Punin. That year there were also rebellions in nearby Pirot and in Belogradchik.

== Notes ==
a: Despite not achieving independence, the rebels negotiated the expulsion of the Ottoman ayan Şerif Mehmed
