= Shi-gakkō =

Private military academy system in Kagoshima founded by Saigō Takamori

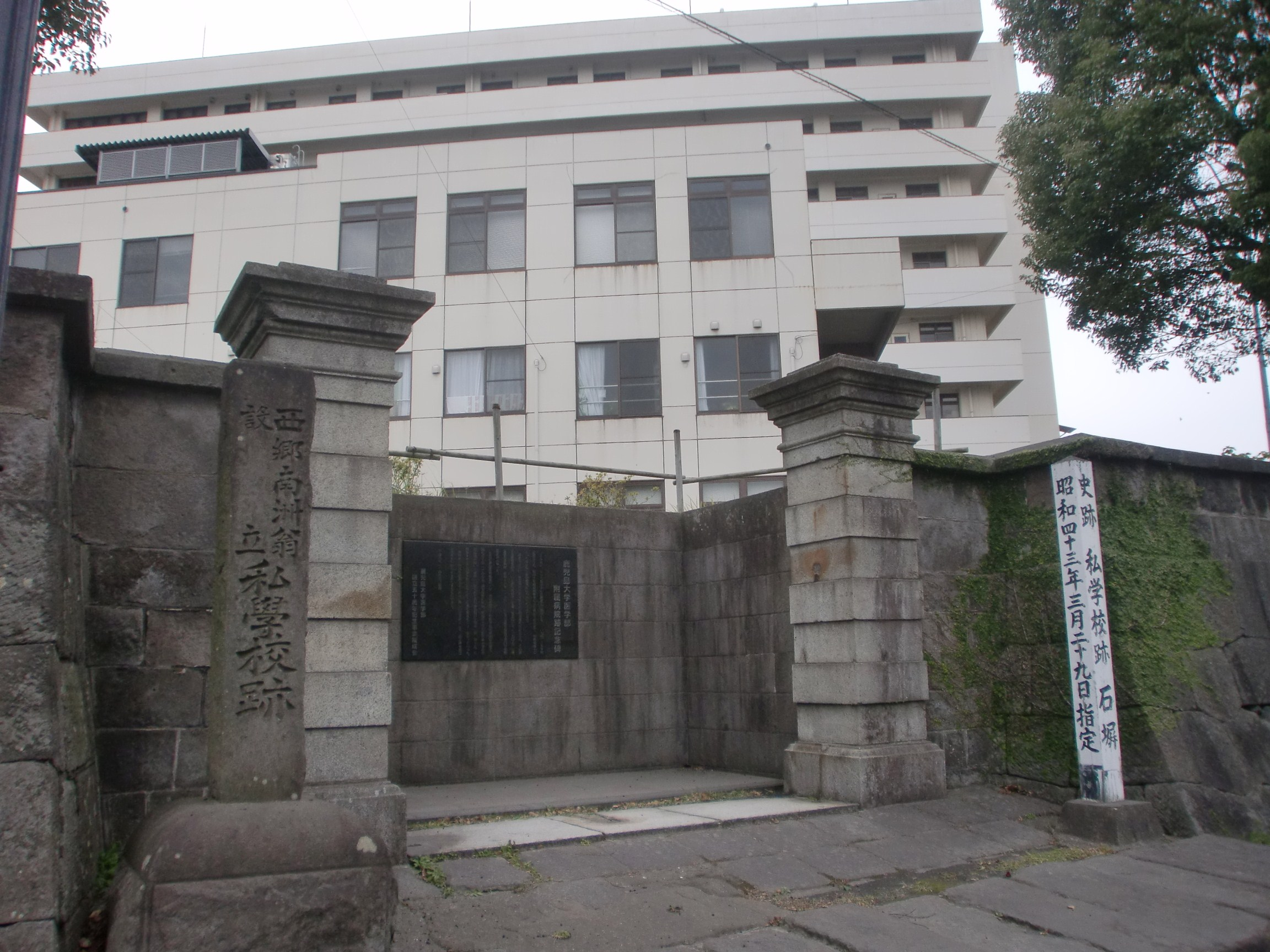
Main gate of the main site of the Shi-gakkō

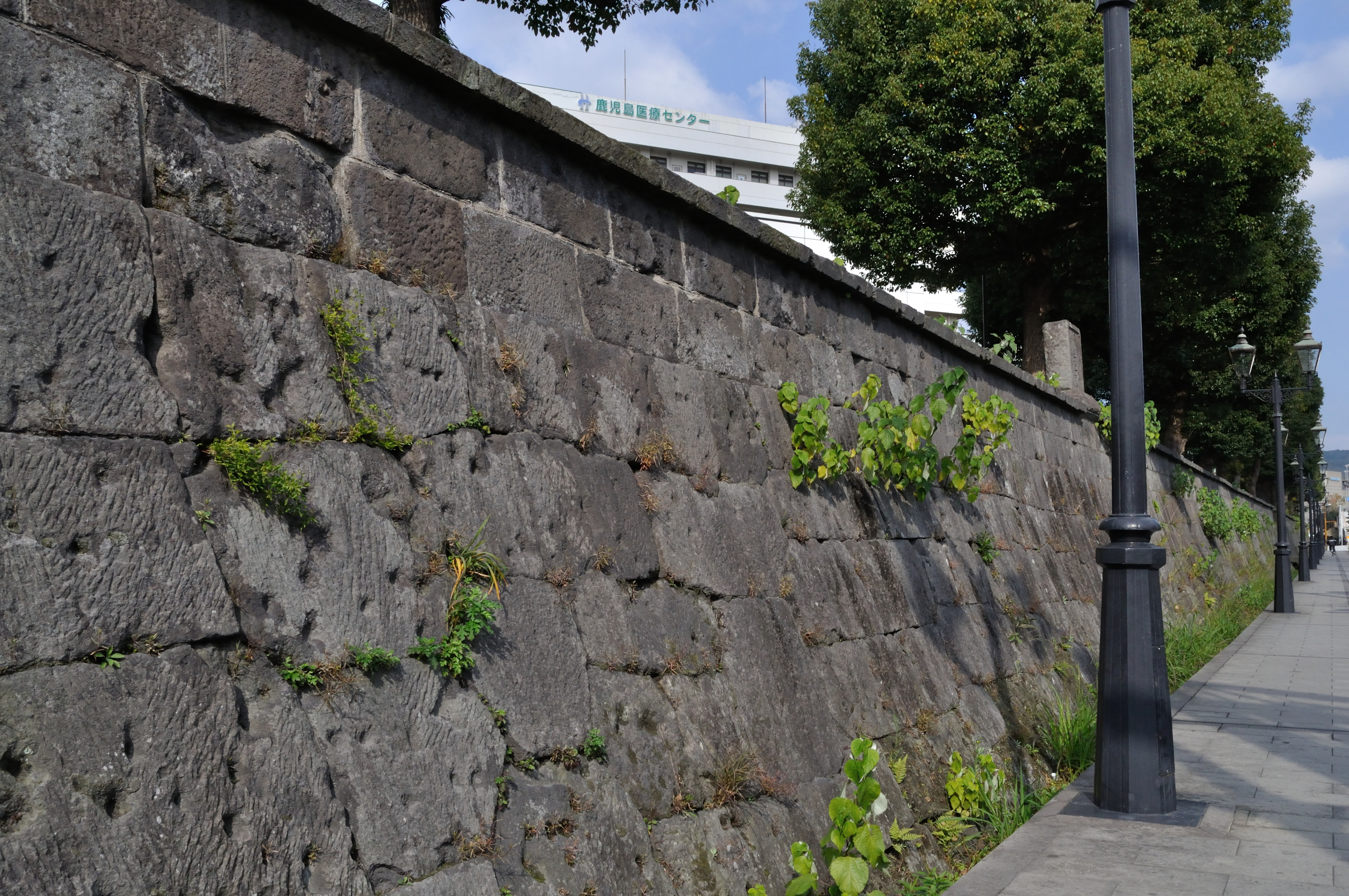
A wall of the main site of the Shi-gakkō, with the National Hospital Organization Kagoshima Medical Center in the background. Bullet holes still remain

The Shi-gakkō or Shigakkō (Japanese: 私學校; literally "Private school") was a system of military academies in Kagoshima Prefecture, Japan during the early Meiji era (late 19th century). Created by Saigō Takamori, the building of these schools and the organization of a political clique inside its walls was a cause of the Satsuma Rebellion. Many officers involved in the rebellion on the side of the Satsuma Domain were graduates of the Shi-gakkō. The main site was located in Shiroyama-chō, Kagoshima, on the site of the current National Hospital Organization Kagoshima Medical Center.

== History ==
After Saigō Takamori's resignation from government in 1873, he returned to his hometown of Kagoshima. In June 1874, Saigō organized the Shi-gakkō, private military schools for young samurai. There were three schools comprising the Shi-gakkō - the "Childhood School", the "Gunner School" (referring to infantry), and the "Artillery School". In order to pay for the establishment of the "Childhood School", Saigo contributed 2,000 koku of rice, Ōyama Tsunayoshi contributed 800 koku, Kirino Toshiaki contributed 200 koku, and Ōkubo Toshimichi contributed 1,000 koku. The other two schools were paid for with money from the prefectural budget. Besides the main three schools, branch schools were established elsewhere in Kagoshima Prefecture. From these schools, Saigō started his own political society by lecturing his students on not only military tactics but his own reactionary political views, his ideas of a samurai elite guiding the masses, and his desire for Japanese expansion. His lieutenant, Kirino Toshiaki, published a study from the Shi-gakkō calling for a Japanese invasion of Korea. In Otsu Junichiro's Dai Nihon Kensei-shi, the Shi-gakkō "anticipated the use of military force in its attempts to change the government". It was also a "political organization opposing the government", though a school by name.

According to those who theorize that the Shi-gakkō was one of the foundations for a private samurai army, by 1876, most administrative positions of some note in Kagoshima were occupied by members of the Shi-gakkō clique. To some, the Shi-gakkō was seen as Saigō's Kingdom (Saigō ōkoku). According to Charles L. Yates, although Saigō and his Shi-gakkō were important in the Satsuma Rebellion itself, there is no indication that the role of the Shi-gakkō was anything but symbolic. The militarization of Kagoshima was something that happened from 1869 to 1870, and Saigō's return and the establishment of the Shi-gakkō was purely the donning of a new name for anti-government samurai in Kagoshima.

During the Satsuma Rebellion, members of the Shi-gakkō played a large part in the Satsuma Domain's army. The Shi-gakkō system's troops carried Snider-Enfield rifles, carbines, pistols and swords. They had two artillery units, using up most of the field guns available in Satsuma, including 28 5.28-pounder mountain guns, 2 15.84-pounder field guns, and 30 mortars. The troops numbered 12,000 men, split into 7 battalions. It is noted that these troops did not have logistical support, other than an allowance of 100 rounds of ammunition per soldier. Citing the alleged assassination plot on Saigō, his expansionist ideas and some confused coercion and misunderstandings of Saigō's political ideas, Shi-gakkō system battalions of the Satsuma Army attempted to help Saigō in launching the Satsuma Rebellion on February 15, 1877. By February 21, hostilities started, and by February 23 and 24, the Satsuma rebels began to lay siege to Kumamoto Castle, and some of the first major battles of the Satsuma Rebellion began.

With Saigō's defeat and death at the Battle of Shiroyama on 24 September 1877, the Shi-gakkō system was disbanded. The site of the Shi-gakkō has, since 1945, been the site of the National Hospital Organization Kagoshima Medical Center.
