= Kirino Toshiaki =

Japanese samurai

- 桐野 利秋
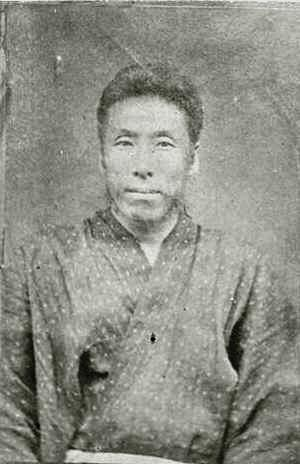
- Born: December 11, 1838; Kagoshima, Satsuma Domain (now Kagoshima, Japan)
- Died: September 24, 1877 (aged 38); Kagoshima, Japan
- Burial place: Nanshu Cemetery, Kagoshima Prefecture, Japan
- Other name: Nakamura Hanjirō (中村 半次郎)
- Spouse: Chōsa Hisa
- Military career
- Allegiance: Empire of Japan (former); Satsuma Domain
- Branch: Imperial Japanese Army (former)
- Service years: 1868–1876
- Rank: Brigadier General
- Nickname: Hitokiri Hanjirō (Hanjiro the Assassin)
- Conflicts: Kinmon Incident; Boshin War: Battle of Aizu; Battle of Toba-Fushimi Satsuma Rebellion; Battle of Shiroyama †
- Other work: former assassin

Kirino Toshiaki (桐野 利秋; December 11, 1838 – September 24, 1877) was a Japanese samurai and general of the early Imperial Japanese Army. He was one of the Four Hitokiri of the Bakumatsu.

== Biography ==
Also known as Nakamura Hanjirō (中村 半次郎), Kirino's sword style was Yakumaru Jigen-ryū, a branch of the high-speed Jigen-ryū . Kirino's activities during the early to mid-1860s largely centered on Kyoto. During the Boshin War, as a senior commander of Satsuma forces, he was a high-ranking officer of the new Imperial Army. It was Kirino who was the representative of the imperial army at the surrender of Wakamatsu Castle, where he received the petition for surrender from Matsudaira Katamori, the lord of Aizu.

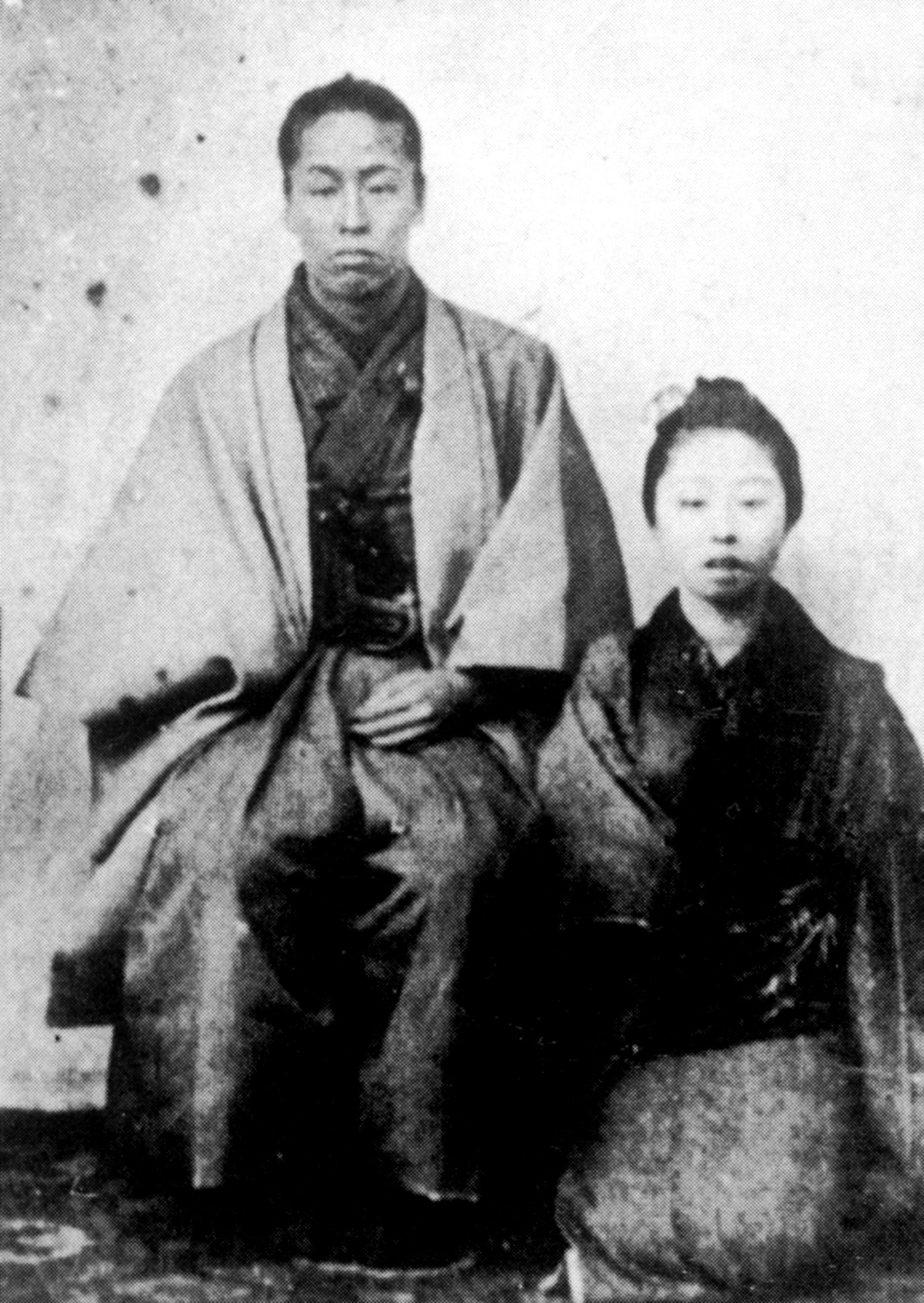
Kirino Toshiaki and his lover Murata Sato (村田さと) at Shijō Street, Kyoto, she was the daughter of Murata Kiseru store owner

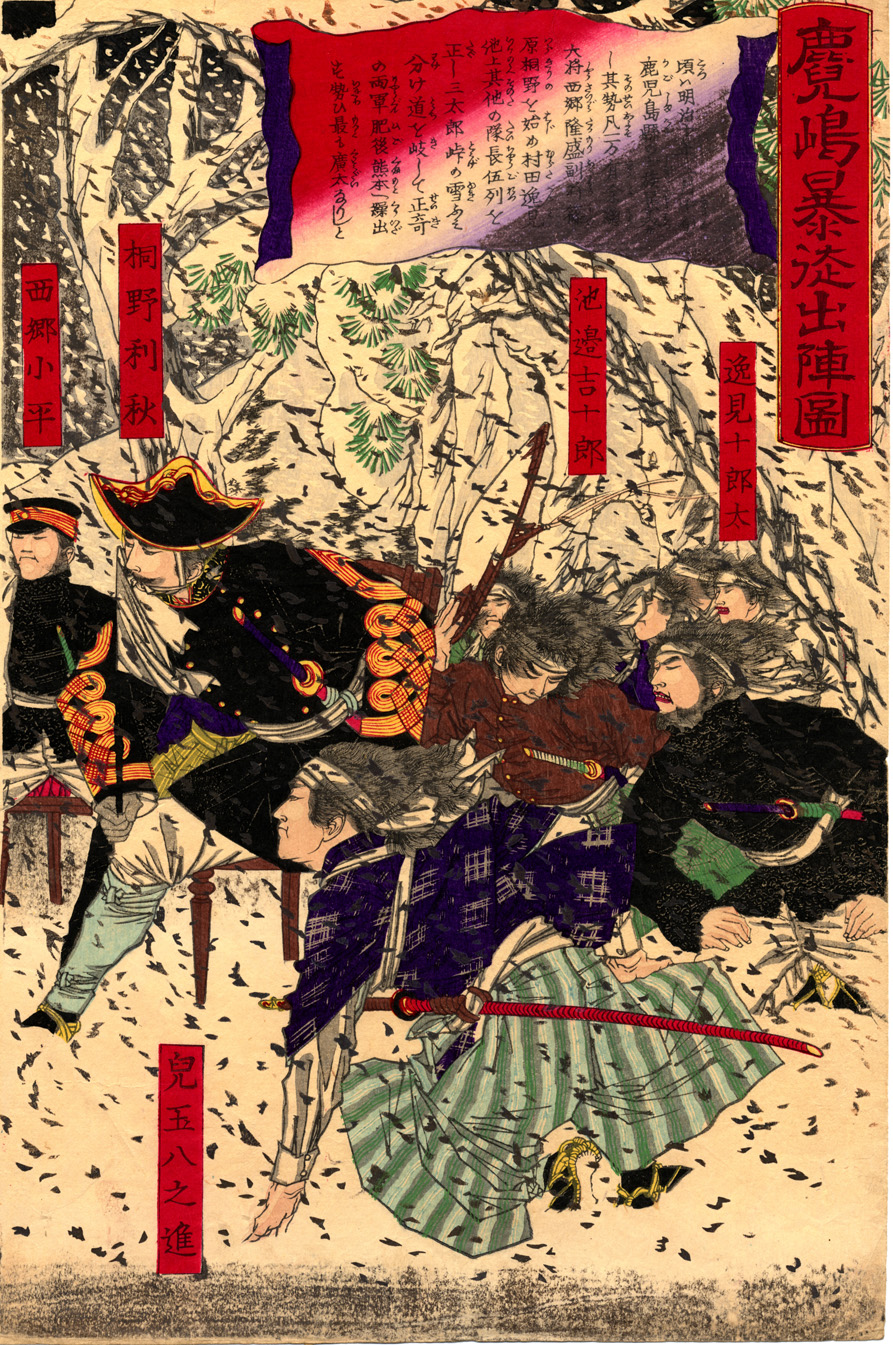
Woodblock print by Tsukioka Yoshitoshi depicting Kirino (in Western-style uniform) in action during the Satsuma Rebellion

Kirino became a brigadier general in the early years of the Imperial Japanese Army. However, he joined the forces of Saigō Takamori during the Satsuma Rebellion, taking part in the march northward to Kumamoto. A lover of French Eau de Cologne, Kirino wore it even during his last battle at Shiroyama. Kirino remained with Saigō until the end, and was killed at the end of the rebellion. He was buried alongside Saigō Takamori, Beppu Shinsuke, Katsura Hisatake, Murata Shinpachi, Shinohara Kunimoto, and Oyama Tsunayoshi among others at the Nanshu Cemetery, Kagoshima Prefecture, Japan.

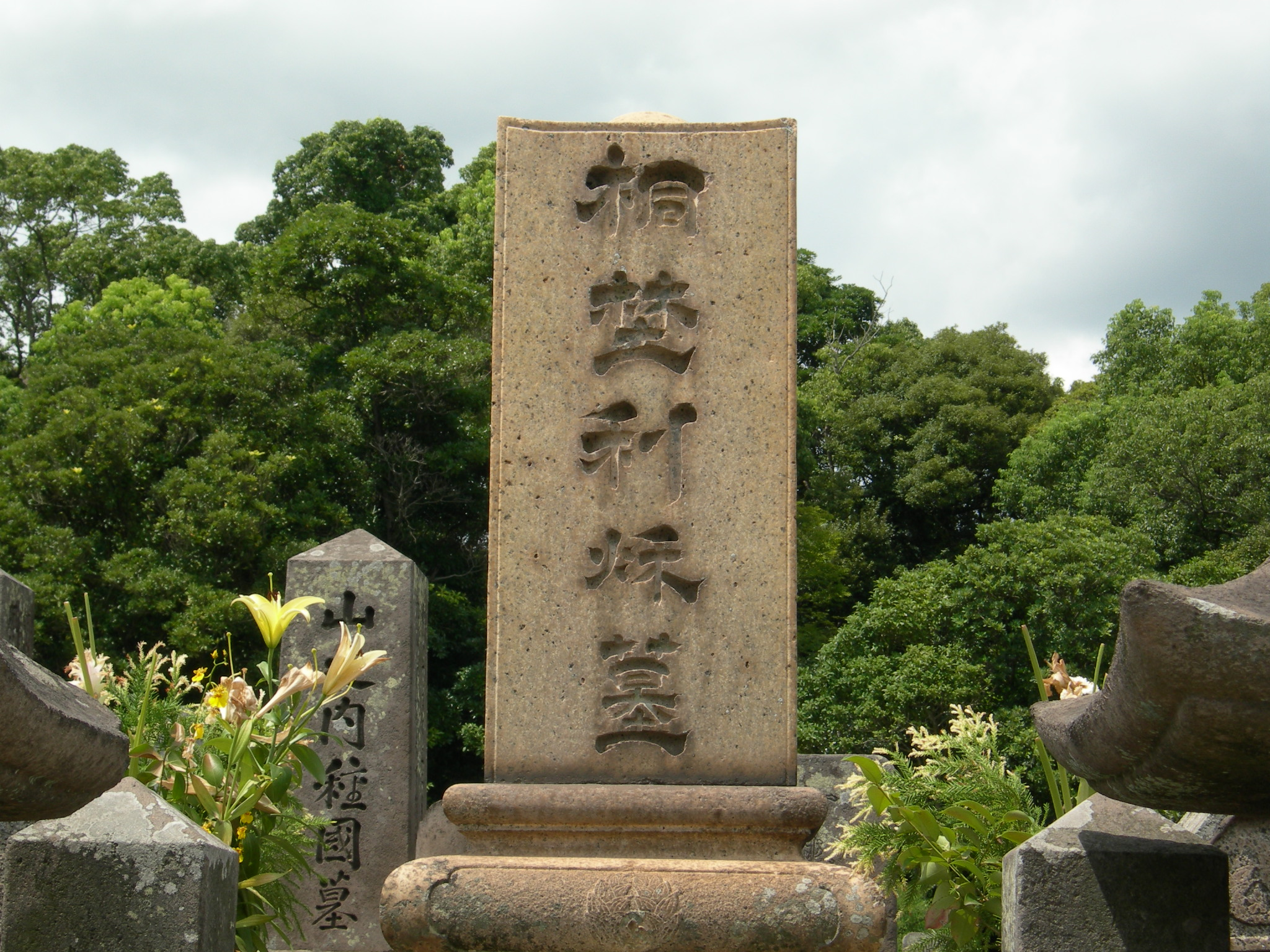
Grave of Toshiaki Kirino

== Cultural references ==
Kirino appears as a character in the history-themed Getsumei Seiki, by Kenji Morita. Kirino also appears as the Army Commander in the manga RED: Livin' on The Edge, by Kenichi Muraeda. He is also referenced in an offshoot of Eiichiro Oda's One piece called Great Detective Loomes where he is referenced as a character called Nakamura Hanzoro.
