= Shiroyama =

Shiroyama (城山, Shiroyama), a Japanese name that means Castle Mountain, may refer to:

== Places ==
- Shiroyama Dam, on the Sagami River in Sagamihara, Kanagawa Prefecture, Honshū, Japan
- Mount Shiroyama, Motegi, Tochigi, Japan
- Mount Shiroyama (Kagoshima), Japan; the site of the Battle of Shiroyama
- Shiroyama Hachimangu, a Shinto shrine in Nagoya, Japan
- Shiroyama, Kanagawa, a town that is now merged into Midori-ku, Japan
- Shiroyama Park, a public park established around the ruins of Takayama Castle, Takayama, Gifu, Japan

== People ==
- Noa Shiroyama (白山 乃愛; born 2012), Japanese actress
- Saburo Shiroyama (城山 三郎; 1927–2007), Japanese novelist
- Shotaro Shiroyama (城山 正太郎; born 1995), Japanese long jumper

== Other uses ==
- Battle of Shiroyama, 1877
- "Shiroyama", a song by Sabaton from The Last Stand
- Shiroyama to Mita-san, a Japanese manga series

== See also ==
- Castle Mountain (disambiguation)
- Yamashiro (disambiguation)
