= Kawamura Sumiyoshi =

Japanese admiral (1836-1904)

Count Kawamura Sumiyoshi
- 川村 純義
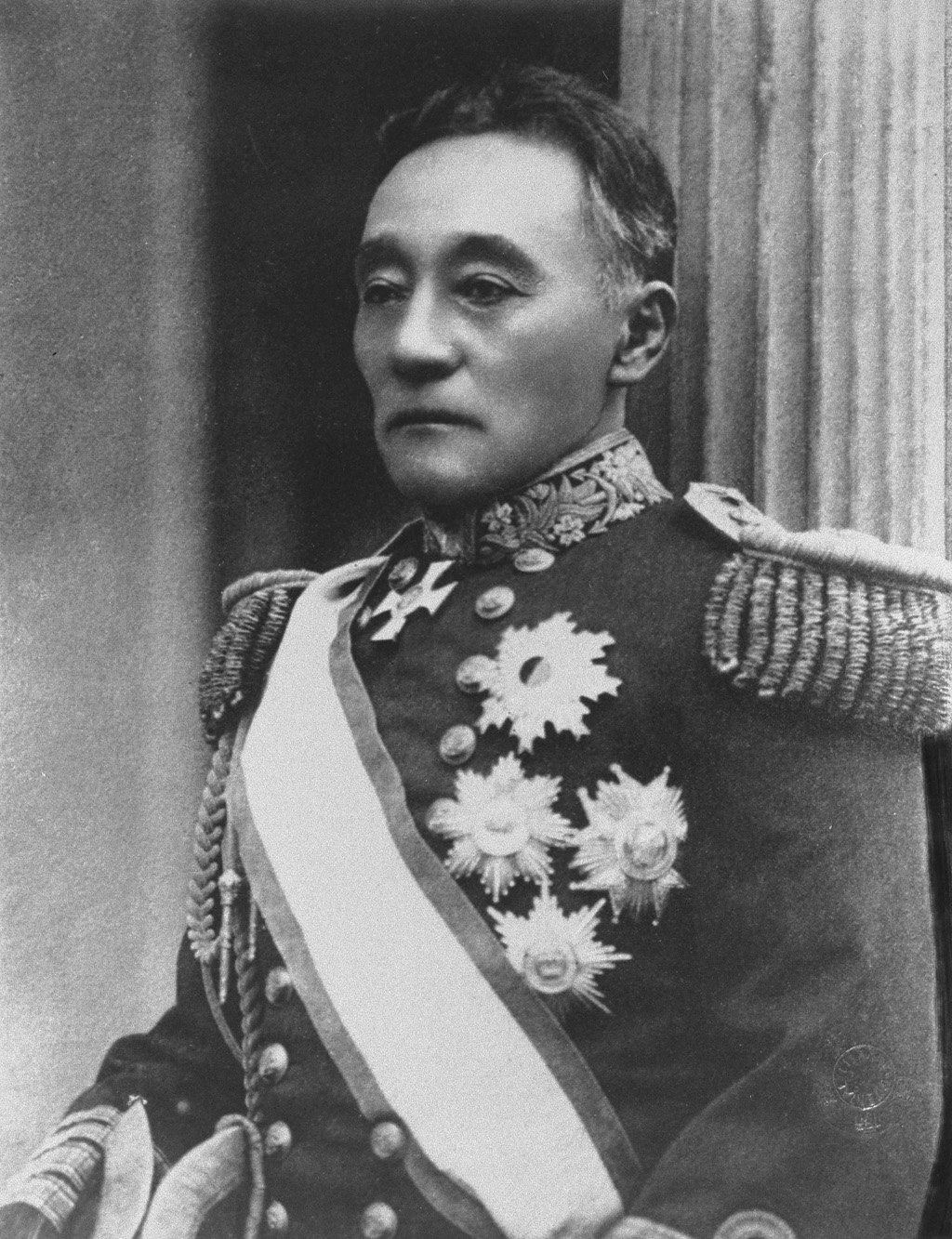
- Born: December 18, 1836; Kagoshima, Satsuma domain, Tokugawa Shogunate
- Died: August 12, 1904 (aged 67); Japan
- Military career
- Allegiance: Empire of Japan
- Branch: Imperial Japanese Navy
- Rank: Admiral (posthumous)
- Commands: Imperial Japanese Naval Academy
- Conflicts: Boshin War; Battle of Aizu; Taiwan Expedition of 1874; Satsuma Rebellion; Battle of Shiroyama
- Other work: Navy Minister, Privy Councillor

Count Kawamura Sumiyoshi (川村 純義; 18 December 1836 – 12 August 1904) was an admiral in the Imperial Japanese Navy. Kawamura's wife, Haru, was the aunt of Saigō Takamori.

== Biography ==
A native of Satsuma, Kawamura studied navigation at Tokugawa bakufu naval school at Nagasaki, the Nagasaki Naval Training Center. In 1868, he joined his Satsuma clansmen, and fought on the imperial side in the Boshin War of the Meiji Restoration as an army general. He was especially noted for his role in the Battle of Aizu-Wakamatsu.

Under the new Meiji government, he became an officer in the fledgling Imperial Japanese Navy, and steadily rose through the ranks. He became first Director of the Imperial Japanese Naval Academy in 1870 and taifu (senior vice minister) of Navy in 1872. He was in command of Japanese naval forces during the Taiwan Expedition of 1874.

During the Satsuma Rebellion, he was placed in command of all Imperial troops in September 1877 at the final Battle of Shiroyama near Kumamoto, when Saigō Takamori was killed (or committed seppuku). This battle, Saigō's last stand against the Meiji government, was the historical basis for the 2003 film The Last Samurai.

In 1878, Kawamura became sangi (councillor) and the second Navy Minister. He remained in that position until 1885 except when he was temporarily replaced by Enomoto Takeaki, and during that period he expanded the influence of people from Satsuma within the navy.

In 1884, he was ennobled with the title of hakushaku (count) under the kazoku peerage system. Later serving as court councillor and Privy Councillor, in 1901 he was given responsibility for the upbringing of the newborn Prince Michi (the future Emperor Hirohito) and his younger brother Prince Chichibu (Yasuhito).

In 1904, Kawamura was posthumously appointed to the rank of admiral, setting a precedent for such honors. His cause of death remains unknown, setting a mystery.
