= Marushin (motorcycle helmet manufacturer) =

Japanese motorcycle helmet brand and manufacturer

- Type: Brand
- Industry: Motorcycle helmets
- Founded: 1958
- Founder: Watanabe Shin
- Parent: Yamashiro (since 2026)
- Website: https://www.marushin-helmet.co.jp/

Marushin is a Japanese motorcycle helmet brand. The brand originated in Tokyo in 1958, when Watanabe Shin established a business that produced motorcycle helmets. Helmet production began in 1962. The business later operated as Marushin Kogyo Co., Ltd. (マルシン工業株式会社).

Marushin helmets were initially distributed in Japan and later expanded into overseas markets. The brand has been sold in Europe since at least the 1980s and has been associated with motorcycle racing and lightweight helmet designs.

== History ==
The Marushin helmet business was founded by Watanabe Shin in Tokyo in 1958. According to the company's European history, the name Marushin combines Shin, Watanabe's given name, with maru, the Japanese word for a circle. The circle was described as a symbol of protection around the head.

The Japanese company states that it has manufactured and sold motorcycle helmets since 1962. Its business history is also described in Japanese trade publications as dating from the early 1960s, when Marushin began developing a range of motorcycle helmets for the domestic market.

In its early years, Marushin helmets were sold primarily in Japan. The brand subsequently expanded into European markets. An Italian motorcycle publication described Marushin as a Japanese helmet manufacturer established in 1958 and reported its arrival on the Italian market in 2006 through an exclusive distributor.

In Germany, distribution of Marushin helmets was handled by Ullrich Holzhausen and his companies. Holzhausen was also associated with JF Motorsport, a motorcycle-accessories distributor that specialized in Marushin helmets. In 2011, JF Motorsport entered insolvency proceedings.

In November 2012, the European trademark rights to Marushin were transferred from Holzhausen to Multi Sport Protection GmbH (MSP). The company subsequently continued the Marushin brand in Europe. MSP later operated under the name Marushin Helmets GmbH; company records list MSP Multi Sport Protection GmbH as its former name and describe its business as the import and export of motorcycle helmets and other helmets under the Marushin trademark in Europe.

In Japan, Yamashiro acquired Marushin Kogyo as a wholly owned subsidiary in March 2018. Yamashiro subsequently reorganized its corporate structure, and on 1 July 2026 Yamashiro absorbed Marushin Kogyo through a merger. The Marushin helmet business continued under Yamashiro's Marushin business group.

== Products ==
Marushin produces motorcycle helmets in several formats, including full-face, open-face and half helmets. The Japanese product range has included both contemporary and retro-styled designs.

European versions of the brand have included the 999 RS full-face helmet and the M-410 modular helmet. The M-410 was developed with a fiberglass shell and was marketed as a lightweight system helmet for touring. A 2017 comparison test by MOTORRAD measured an M-410 at 1,606 grams in size L; the magazine also reported that the helmet was manufactured in China and certified to the ECE standard.

The 999 RS series was marketed as a premium fiberglass full-face helmet. Later versions included an internal sun visor, a Pinlock-prepared visor and removable interior padding. The manufacturer described the 999 RS as one of its principal models.

== Safety testing ==
Marushin helmets have been independently tested by the United Kingdom's Department for Transport SHARP motorcycle helmet testing programme. As of 2026, SHARP listed eight Marushin models that had undergone its testing programme since 2007. Their ratings ranged from one to five stars, with four models receiving five stars: the 777 Tiger, 777 Samura, RS1 Carbon and RS2 Carbon.

Among the independently tested models, the Marushin RS1 Carbon received a five-star SHARP rating. SHARP lists it as a full-face helmet with a carbon-fibre shell and an approximate weight of 1.10 kg.

The 777 Tiger and 777 Samura also received five-star SHARP ratings. Both were tested as full-face helmets with fiberglass shells.

== Motorsport and racing ==
Marushin has been associated with motorcycle racing and rider sponsorship, particularly in Europe. The brand was used by riders competing in the Pro Superbike series and other motorcycle-racing events. Contemporary accounts of the European business describe Marushin as a specialist in lightweight racing helmets and identify models such as the RS2 and RS3 as part of its racing-oriented product line.

The RS3, introduced for the 2013 season, was announced as a composite racing helmet weighing approximately 1,050 grams, with a carbon-fibre version planned for the following year.
