= Sagawa Kanbei =

Sagawa Kanbei 佐川官兵衛
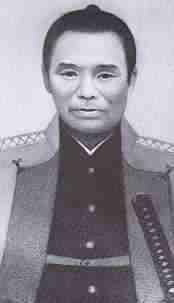
- Born: October 10, 1831; Aizu Domain, Tokugawa shogunate
- Died: March 18, 1877 (aged 45); Higo Province, Japan
- Burial place: Oita Prefecture Gokoku Shrine
- Military career
- Allegiance: Aizu Domain; Japan
- Branch: Imperial Japanese Army
- Service years: 1862 – 1868; 1874 – 1877
- Rank: First Inspector
- Nickname: Kikanbei
- Conflicts: Boshin War: Battle of Toba–Fushimi; Battle of Hokuetsu; Battle of Aizu; Satsuma Rebellion: Battle of Tabaruzaka; Siege of Kumamoto Castle †

Sagawa Kanbei (佐川 官兵衛, Sagawa Kanbe'e), also known as Sagawa Naoki (1831–1877), was a military figure of the Aizu Domain at the end of the Tokugawa shogunate. He was also a police officer during the Meiji era before he was killed at the Siege of Kumamoto Castle in 1877.

== Biography ==
=== Bakumatsu era ===
He was born the son of Naomichi Sagawa, a samurai of the Aizu Domain. In 1862, he followed the feudal lord, Matsudaira Katamori, and served as a head of the school before serving as a school magistrate.

When the Boshin War broke out in January 1868, Kanbei served the Aizu Domain and participated in the Battle of Toba–Fushimi. His service during the battle earned him the nickname of Kikanbei. After the battle, he returned to Aizu and went to participate in the Battle of Hokuetsu, but when the war situation became unfavorable, he left the front with the Ōuetsu Reppan Dōmei clans and returned to Aizu. In the Battle of Aizu on August 29, he led about 1,000 elites and was appointed commander of the castle's counter-attack force. However, he was drunk with the sake he received from his feudal lord the night before the attack, and was defeated late in the sortie, which was still early in the Battle of Chomeiji. He was redeemed in the Battle of Zaimoku-Cho (Sumiyoshi Kawara) on September 5, when he led a small number of soldiers and defeated the new Imperial Japanese Army and secured food for Aizuwakamatsu Castle. After the end of the Boshin War, he was detained in Tokyo with other feudal lords.

=== Meiji Era ===
When the former Aizu domain was revived as the Tonami Domain, he moved to Gonohe, Aomori Prefecture. After the abolition of the han system, he served at the Metropolitan Police Department in 1874 after Chief Kawaji Toshiyoshi praised him for his service during the Boshin War, and was appointed as the First Grand Inspector. In the Satsuma Rebellion, he served as the first platoon leader of the Bungoguchi No. 1 Police Corps from the beginning of the war. In Aso District, Kumamoto, he was killed when he was shot while engaged in hand to hand combat during the Siege of Kumamoto Castle. He died at the age of 45. He was buried at Oita Prefecture Gokoku Shrine and Chofuku-ji Temple in Kitakata City, Fukushima Prefecture.

=== Legacy ===
Several monuments in Minamiaso, Kumamoto are dedicated to Kanbei.
