= Shancheng (disambiguation) =

Shancheng (Chinese: 山城, lit. "Mountain City" or "Mountain Fortress") may refer to several places in China:

District

- Shancheng District of Hebi City, Henan

Towns

- Shancheng, Nanjing County, a town in and the county seat of Nanjing County, Fujian
- Shancheng, Taining County (杉城), in Taining County, Fujian

== See also ==
- Shangcheng (disambiguation)
- Yamashiro (disambiguation), Japanese placename and personal name, usually written with the same Chinese/Japanese characters, and with a similar meaning, as the Chinese "Shancheng"
