= Battle of Tabaruzaka =

1877 battle of the Satsuma Rebellion

- Part of the Satsuma Rebellion
- Fierce Battle at Tabaruzaka Hill, Kobayashi Eitaku
Date	3–20 March 1877
Location	Kumamoto, Kumamoto Prefecture, Japan
Result	Imperial victory

Belligerents
Japan	Satsuma Domain

Commanders and leaders
(Empire of Japan) Arisugawa Taruhito (Empire of Japan) Yamagata Aritomo (Empire of Japan) Sagawa Kanbei	(Satsuma Domain) Saigō Takamori

Strength
90,000	15,000

Casualties and losses
4,000 killed and wounded	4,000 killed and wounded

The Battle of Tabaruzaka was a major battle of the Satsuma Rebellion. It took place in March 1877, on the island of Kyushu, Japan, concurrently to the Siege of Kumamoto Castle.

== Summary ==
The Battle of Tabaruzaka began on March 3, 1877 when troops loyal to the Imperial Meiji government seeking to break the Siege of Kumamoto Castle met rebel Satsuma samurai forces seeking to capture the main road out of Kumamoto. The battle eventually spread across a 6.5 mile line from Tabaruzaka to the Ariake Sea.

Skirmishes occurred for the first of several days of the battle, as both sides continued to bring additional support troops to the area. In the end, Saigō Takamori's forces would number 15,000, and the Imperial Japanese Army, led by Arisugawa Taruhito and Yamagata Aritomo, numbered 90,000. The first days of the battle were marked by heavy rain, which hampered the rebels' ability to resupply. As a result of low ammunition supplies, and water damage to their antiquated muzzle-loading rifles, the rebel forces were forced to fight with swords. On March 15, the government forces launched a major assault on the rebel lines. On March 20, the rebels were forced to retreat, initially regrouping at Ueki, and then were driven from that position as well.

Final losses at Tabaruzaka were at least 4,000 dead and wounded on both sides. This number included future Prime Minister of Japan Terauchi Masatake, who was maimed in the course of the battle and lost his right hand.

== Aftermath ==
Although the Siege of Kumamoto Castle did not end for several weeks after the Battle of Tabaruzaka, and the war lasted until September, this battle showed that eventually the government's superiority in men and material would ultimately overwhelm the rebel forces.
