= Shangcheng =

Shangcheng may refer to:

- Shangcheng County (商城县), in Xinyang, Henan, China
- Shangcheng District (上城区), in Hangzhou, Zhejiang, China
- Shangcheng, Cheng'an County (商城镇), in Hebei, China
- Shangcheng (上丞), a Chinese star name which may refer to:
  - HD 19275 (as adopted by the IAU)
  - BK Camelopardalis

== See also ==
- Shangchen, archaeological site in Shaanxi, China
- Shancheng (disambiguation)
