= Beppu Shinsuke =

Japanese Samurai

- 別府 晋介
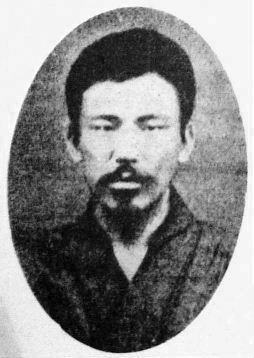
- Beppu Shinsuke
- Born: 1847; Yoshino, Kagoshima, Kagoshima Prefecture, Japan
- Died: September 24, 1877 (aged 29–30); Kagoshima, Empire of Japan
- Burial place: Nanshu Cemetery, Kagoshima Prefecture, Japan
- Military career
- Allegiance: Satsuma Domain
- Rank: Major
- Conflicts: Boshin War: Battle of Shirakawa; Battle of Aizu; Satsuma Rebellion: Siege of Kumamoto Castle; Battle of Shiroyama †

Beppu Shinsuke (別府 晋介; 1847 – September 24, 1877) was a Japanese samurai of the late Edo period who fought for the Satsuma Domain at the Battle of Shiroyama.

== Background ==
He was a samurai of the Satsuma Domain, and an associate of Saigō Takamori. Beppu joined Saigō's forces during the Satsuma Rebellion. At the end of the rebellion in September 24, 1877, it was Beppu who was the second at Saigō's seppuku. After Saigō's death, the vastly outnumbered Beppu and the other ex-samurais charged against the ranks of the attacking Imperial Japanese Army forces, and were killed.
