= Yamashiro =

Yamashiro is a Japanese word with kanji often meaning mountain castle (山城). There are however other kanji spellings.

- Yamashiro, Kyoto, former town in Japan
- Yamashiro, Tokushima, former town in Japan
- Yamashiro Province, former Japanese province
- Japanese battleship Yamashiro, a battleship of the Imperial Japanese Navy
- Yamashiro Onsen, an onsen in Kaga, Ishikawa province
- Yamashiro Park Taiyogaoka Stadium, an athletic stadium in Uji, Kyoto, Japan
- Yamashiro Historic District, a villa, restaurant, and gardens in Los Angeles, California
- Yamashiro, or yamajiro, category of Japanese castle in which the main structures are located on a mountain

In addition to kanji variation, the word could also be read as Yamagusuku in the Ryukyu Islands.

== People ==
Yamashiro is a Japanese surname, Ryukyuan surname. In the Okinawan language, the kanji is read Yamagusuku. Notable people with the surname include:

- Prince Yamashiro (d.643)
- Danny Yamashiro (1967- )
- Hiroshi Yamashiro (1958- )
- Junya Yamashiro (1985- )
- Rafael Yamashiro (1963- )
- Shingo Yamashiro (1938–2009)
- Shoji Yamashiro, pseudonym for Tsutomu Ōhashi
- Stephen K. Yamashiro (1941–2011)
- Mary Yamashiro Otani (1923–2005)
- Augusto Miyashiro Yamashiro (1949- )

=== Fictional characters ===
- Aoba Yamashiro
- Tatsu Yamashiro

== See also ==
- Shiroyama (disambiguation)
- Shancheng (disambiguation), Chinese placenames that is written with the same Chinese/Japanese characters as, and has a similar meaning to, the Japanese Yamashiro
