= Heimin =

Japanese social class

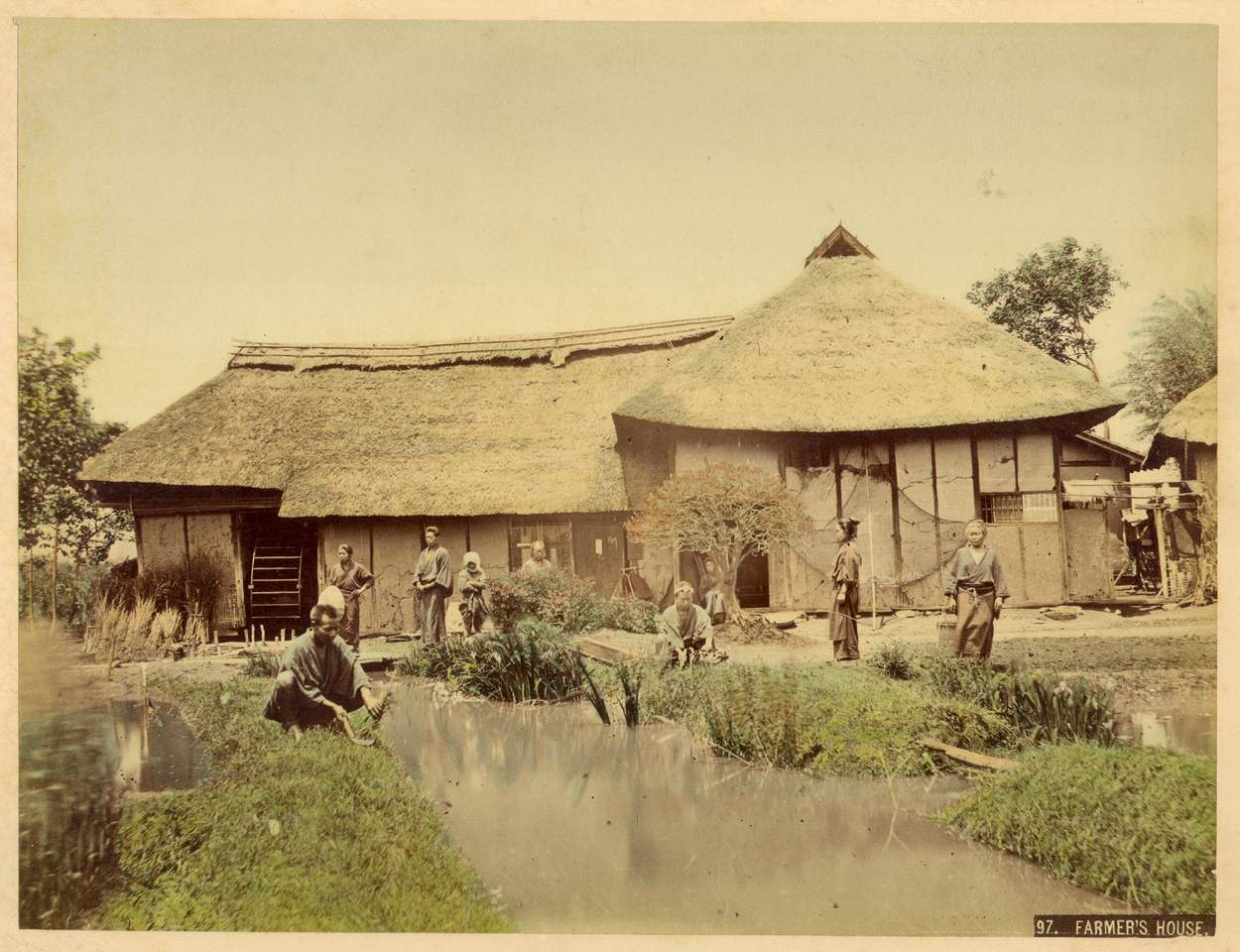
Japanese farmers from the Meiji period

Heimin (平民) is the Japanese word for commoner. The word first came into use towards the end of the Edo period to denote people who were born without any social privileges, contrasting them with shizoku. Heimin mostly consisted of farmers, artisans and merchants.

== History ==
During the Meiji Restoration, Japan began a period of rapid industrialisation and Westernisation. By the 1880s, the samurai, who were once de facto in control of Japan, had lost a major part of their significance and power, which coincided with the rise of the heimin class. In accordance with the new period of Westernisation, Japan's social values changed, and economic status was eventually considered more important than a person's family history.

Tokutomi Sohō, in his essay Youth of the New Japan (Shin Nihon no Seinen), argued that the traditionalist outlook of Japan's aristocrats was stifling economic development, as heimin suffered from discrimination and unemployment – in 1891, only 50% of Japanese politics and economics college graduates were able to find employment. Furthermore, only 2% of the population was allowed to vote, of which most were "landowners and capitalists". Sohō believed that Japan would not be able to thrive unless aristocratic "social parasites" relinquished their control over the country's politics and economy. Sohō also coined the term heiminism, to describe his advocacy for Japanese industrialisation and democratisation.

== See also ==
- Heimin Shinbun, a socialist newspaper active in Japan from 1903 to 1905
- Kazoku, Japanese nobility from the Meiji period
