= Saigō Takamori =

Japanese samurai and politician (1828–1877)

- 西郷 隆盛
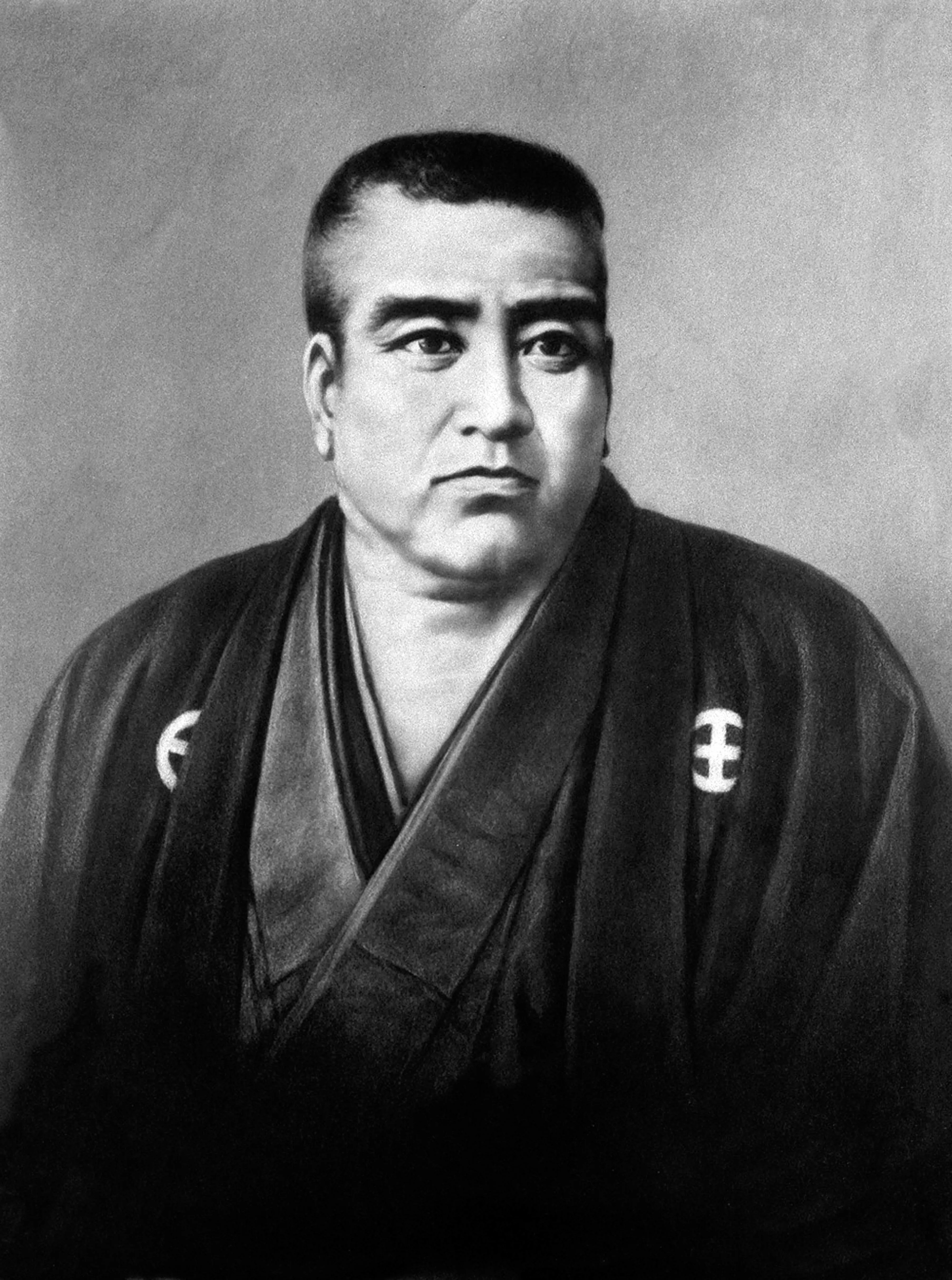
- Posthumous portrait by C. Nakagawa
- Born: Saigō Kokichi; 23 January 1828; Kagoshima, Satsuma Domain
- Died: 24 September 1877 (aged 49); Kagoshima, Empire of Japan
- Burial place: Nanshu Cemetery, Kagoshima Prefecture, Japan
- Other names: Saigō Nanshū; Saigō Kichinosuke; Kikuchi Gengo
- Spouses: Suga Ijuin (m. 1852; div. 1854) Otoma Kane "Aigana" (m. 1859–1862) Iwayama Itoko (m. 1865)
- Children: Saigō Kikujirō (son); Saigō Kikusō (daughter); Saigō Toratarō (son); Saigō Umajirō (son); Saigō Torizō (son)
- Military career
- Allegiance: Satsuma Domain
- Rank: Field Marshal (1872–1873); General (1873–1876)
- Conflicts: Boshin War; Battle of Toba–Fushimi; Battle of Ueno; Satsuma Rebellion; Siege of Kumamoto Castle; Battle of Tabaruzaka; Battle of Shiroyama ‡‡

Saigō Takamori (西郷 隆盛; 23 January 1828 – 24 September 1877) was a Japanese samurai and politician who was one of the most influential figures in Japanese history. He played a key role in the Meiji Restoration which overthrew the Tokugawa shogunate in 1868, and subsequently served in the new Meiji government. However, he later became disillusioned with the direction of the new regime and led the Satsuma Rebellion against it in 1877, in which he was killed.

Born into a low-ranking samurai family in Satsuma Domain, Saigō rose to prominence as a retainer of Shimazu Nariakira, the daimyō of Satsuma. He was involved in national politics in Edo and Kyoto, advocating for shogunal reform and a stronger imperial role. After Nariakira's death, Saigō was exiled twice, first to Amami Ōshima and then to the harsher Okinoerabujima, periods during which he developed his political and philosophical ideas. Pardoned and recalled, he played a crucial part in forging the Satchō Alliance between Satsuma and Chōshū Domain, which was instrumental in the shogunate's downfall during the Boshin War. Saigō commanded imperial forces and negotiated the bloodless surrender of Edo Castle.

In the Meiji government, Saigō initially held significant posts, including commander of the Imperial Guard, and was involved in major reforms such as the abolition of the han system. He was a central figure in the caretaker government during the Iwakura Mission. In 1873, he resigned from the government over policy disagreements, particularly the rejection of his proposal for a mission to Korea (Seikanron). Returning to his native Kagoshima, Saigō became the reluctant leader of disaffected samurai who rose against the central government in the Satsuma Rebellion. Despite initial successes, the rebellion was crushed by the numerically and technologically superior Imperial Japanese Army. Saigō died by seppuku after being critically wounded in the final battle at Shiroyama. All of his men were killed in action.

Saigō's death cemented his legendary status. He is often referred to as "the last true samurai" and remains a highly popular and romanticized figure in Japan. His life and death have been the subject of numerous books, films, and artistic depictions, reflecting an enduring fascination with his character and his complex role in Japan's transition from feudalism to a modern state. While historical accounts of his actions and motivations vary, Saigō Takamori is widely regarded as a symbol of samurai virtue, sincerity, and tragic heroism.

== Early life and career in Satsuma ==
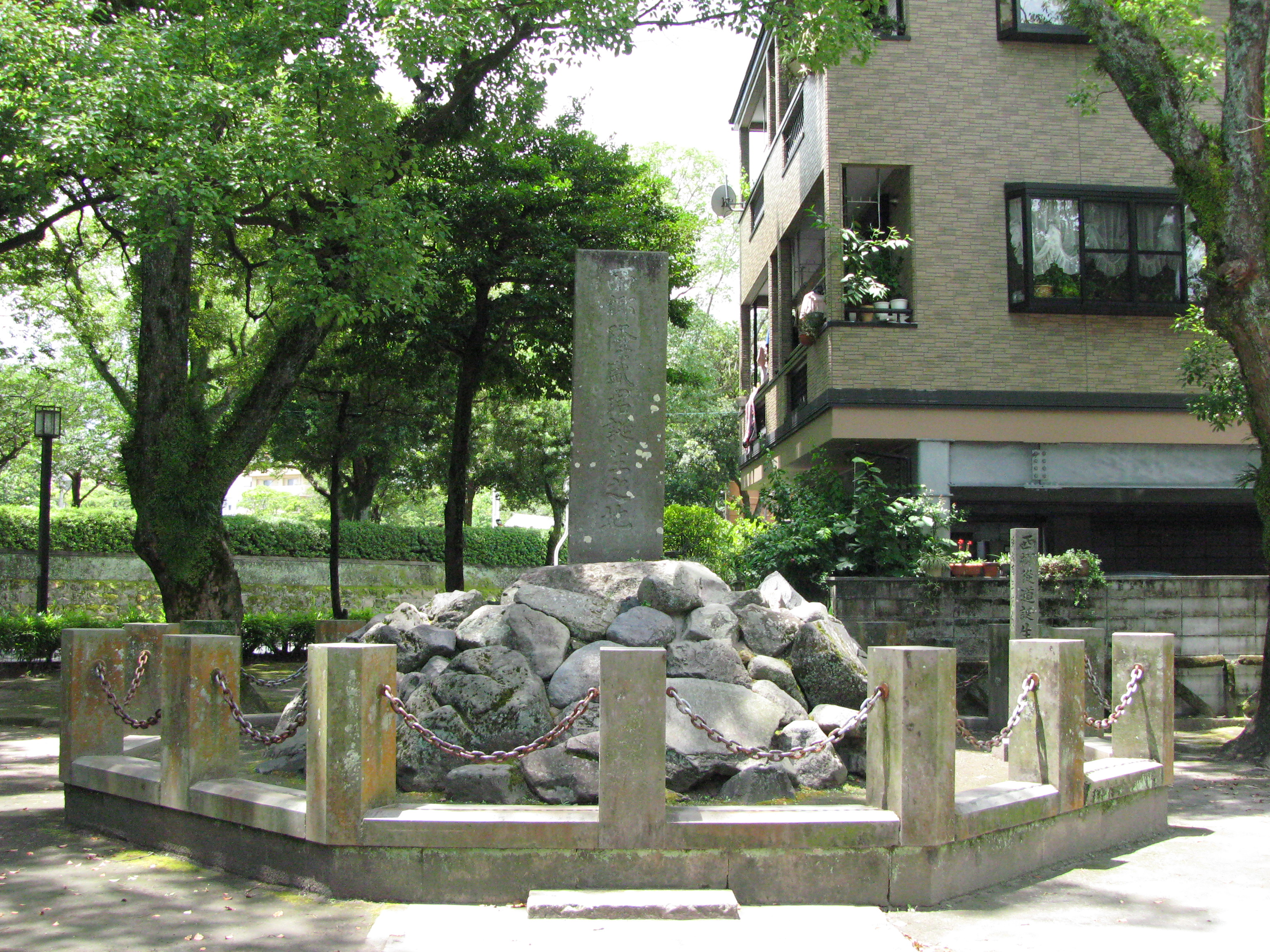
Monument marking Saigō's birthplace in Kagoshima

Saigō Takamori (given name Kokichi, later Takamori; art name Nanshū) was born in Kajiya-chō, Kagoshima, the castle town of Satsuma Domain, on 23 January 1828. His family were low-ranking samurai (koshōgumi), and faced financial hardship. The Saigō household was large, at its maximum totaling sixteen people, including Saigō's parents, grandparents, his six younger siblings, and the family of his father's younger brother. Saigō's father, Kichibei, was a division chief in the domain's exchequer responsible for taxation, a relatively low "white-collar" urban samurai position. His mother, Masa, was the daughter of a local samurai.

Saigō's education took place within Satsuma's unique two-tiered system. He attended a neighborhood school called a gojū, which emphasized martial arts, group solidarity, and rudimentary education, instilling Confucian values such as loyalty, duty, and honor. At age thirteen or fourteen, he suffered a serious injury to his right arm in an altercation with another samurai, which impeded his martial arts training and reportedly led him to focus more on scholarship. He also attended the domain academy, the Zōshikan, which centered on the Confucian classics. While the Zōshikan followed the orthodox Zhu Xi school of Neo-Confucianism, Saigō became interested in the more action-oriented Ōyōmei (Wang Yangming) learning, particularly through the syncretic teachings of Satō Issai. Saigō's later philosophy, emphasizing sincerity, virtuous action, and a direct connection to Heaven (ten), drew heavily from Satō Issai's ideas.

In 1844, at the age of sixteen, Saigō began work as an assistant clerk in the county office (kōri bugyōsho). His duties involved inspecting farm villages, supervising officials, encouraging agricultural production, and collecting taxes. This experience made him deeply aware of the peasants' hardships and the domain's crippling tax levies, fostering a lifelong concern for their welfare. In an 1856 memorial, Saigō argued that official corruption and loss of self-respect among local administrators (often gōshi, or rural samurai) were the main causes of peasant suffering. He advocated for restoring the pride and morale of these administrators as the key to benevolent governance. The year 1852 was particularly difficult for Saigō; he entered an arranged marriage with Ijuin Suga, which was dissolved two years later, and both his parents died within months of each other, leaving him as head of the impoverished family.

== Rise to national prominence ==
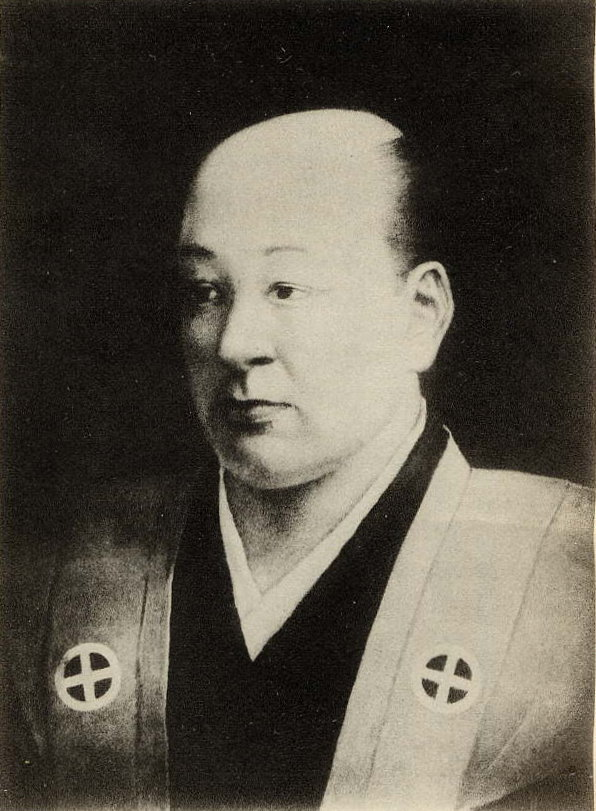
Shimazu Nariakira

Saigō's entry into national politics began in early 1854 when he was promoted from assistant clerk to an attendant of the daimyō of Satsuma, Shimazu Nariakira. He was selected to accompany Nariakira on his biennial journey to the shogunal capital of Edo (present-day Tokyo). The precise reasons for Saigō's sudden promotion remain a mystery, as there is no evidence of prior connection between him and Nariakira. Upon arrival in Edo, Nariakira appointed Saigō as his Edo gardener (oniwaban), an innocuous post that allowed Saigō to travel freely, relaying secret messages from Nariakira to other daimyō and political figures without arousing the suspicion of shogunal spies.

Nariakira had become daimyō in 1851 after a bloody succession dispute known as the Oyura Disturbance (Oyura Sōdō), in which he overcame opposition from his father Narioki, Narioki's concubine Oyura, and the powerful domain elder Zusho Hirosato. Nariakira was a progressive and ambitious leader, keen on Western learning and technology, and determined to increase Satsuma's influence in national affairs. Saigō became Nariakira's trusted confidant and adviser. He was deeply impressed by Mito learning, a school of thought emphasizing reverence for the Emperor and the expulsion of foreigners (sonnō jōi), particularly through his interactions with the Mito scholar Fujita Tōko.

Saigō actively worked on Nariakira's behalf in the complex political maneuvering surrounding the shogunal succession crisis and the signing of treaties with Western powers following Commodore Perry's arrival. Nariakira advocated for Hitotsubashi Keiki (later Tokugawa Yoshinobu) as successor to the childless and ailing Shōgun Tokugawa Iesada, and opposed the Harris Treaty. Saigō's devotion to Nariakira was intense; after the death of Nariakira's only surviving son, Torajūmaru, in 1854, which Saigō suspected was due to poisoning by Oyura's faction, he declared himself willing to die to avenge his lord.

Nariakira's sudden death in July 1858 was a devastating blow to Saigō. With his patron gone and the political tide turning against the reformers with Ii Naosuke's rise to power as Great Councilor (Tairō), Saigō's position became precarious. Ii Naosuke resolved the succession dispute in favor of Tokugawa Iemochi and proceeded with the signing of treaties, initiating the Ansei Purge against his opponents.

== Exile and intellectual growth ==
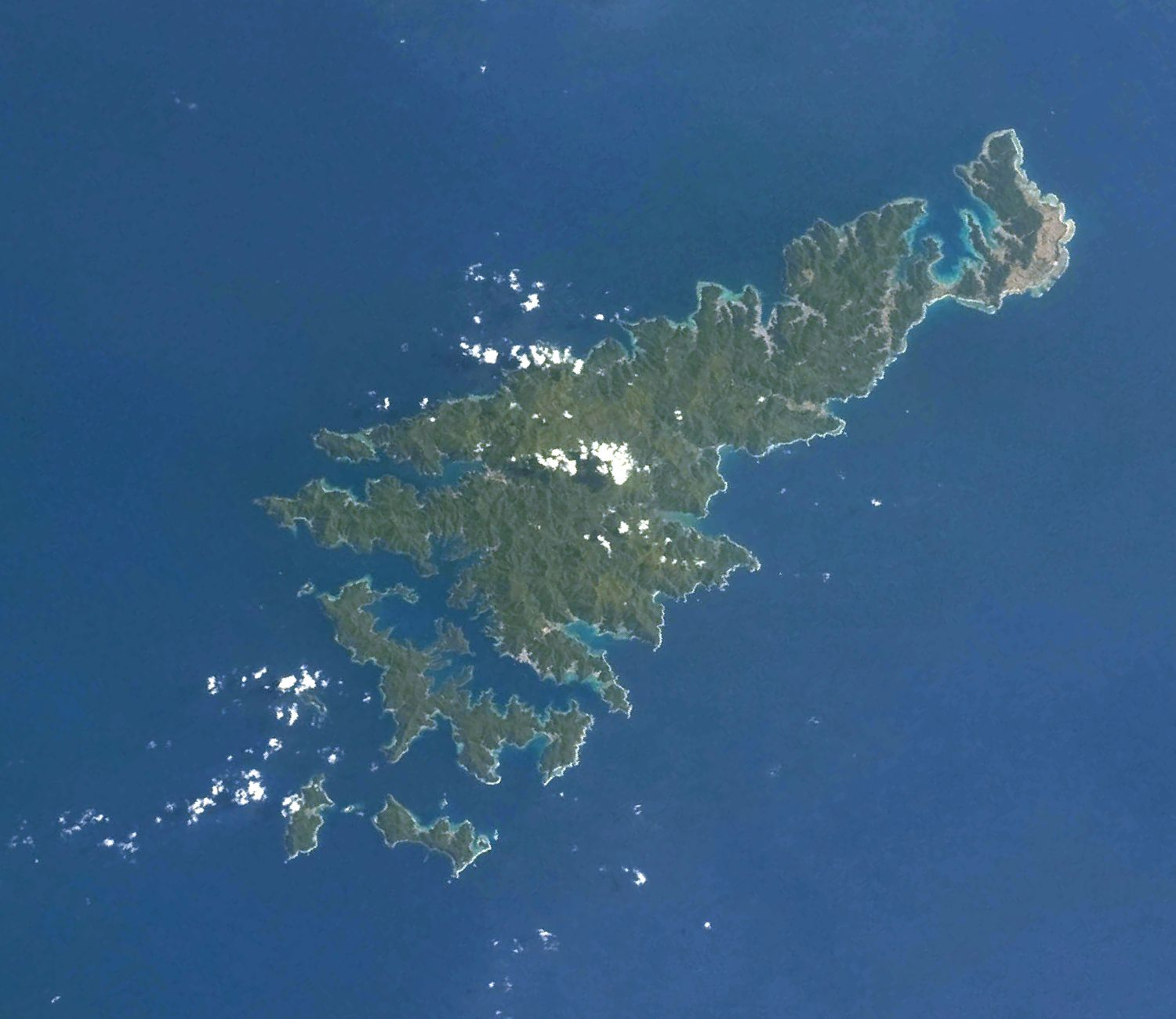
Amami Ōshima, the site of Saigō's first exile from 1859 to 1862

Facing arrest in the Ansei Purge, Saigō attempted suicide in November 1858 by throwing himself into Kagoshima Bay with the monk Gesshō, who was also sought by the shogunate. Saigō was rescued, but Gesshō drowned. To protect him from the shogunate, Satsuma domain officially declared Saigō dead and exiled him to Amami Ōshima, a remote island in the Ryukyu Islands under Satsuma's control. He lived on Amami from early 1859 to early 1862 under the assumed name Kikuchi Gengo. During this first exile, Saigō married a local woman, Aigana, with whom he had two children, a son, Kikujirō, and a daughter, Kikusō. He also taught local children and engaged in study and calligraphy.

Saigō was recalled to Satsuma in early 1862 at the behest of Shimazu Hisamitsu, Nariakira's younger half-brother and now the de facto ruler of Satsuma. Hisamitsu was planning to lead troops to Kyoto to pressure the shogunate into reforms. Saigō, however, clashed with Hisamitsu over strategy, believing Hisamitsu's plans to be rash and ill-conceived. Disobeying orders, Saigō went to Osaka and Kyoto to try and restrain radical Satsuma samurai who were eager for direct action. Hisamitsu, angered by Saigō's insubordination and fearing he might incite the radicals, had Saigō arrested.

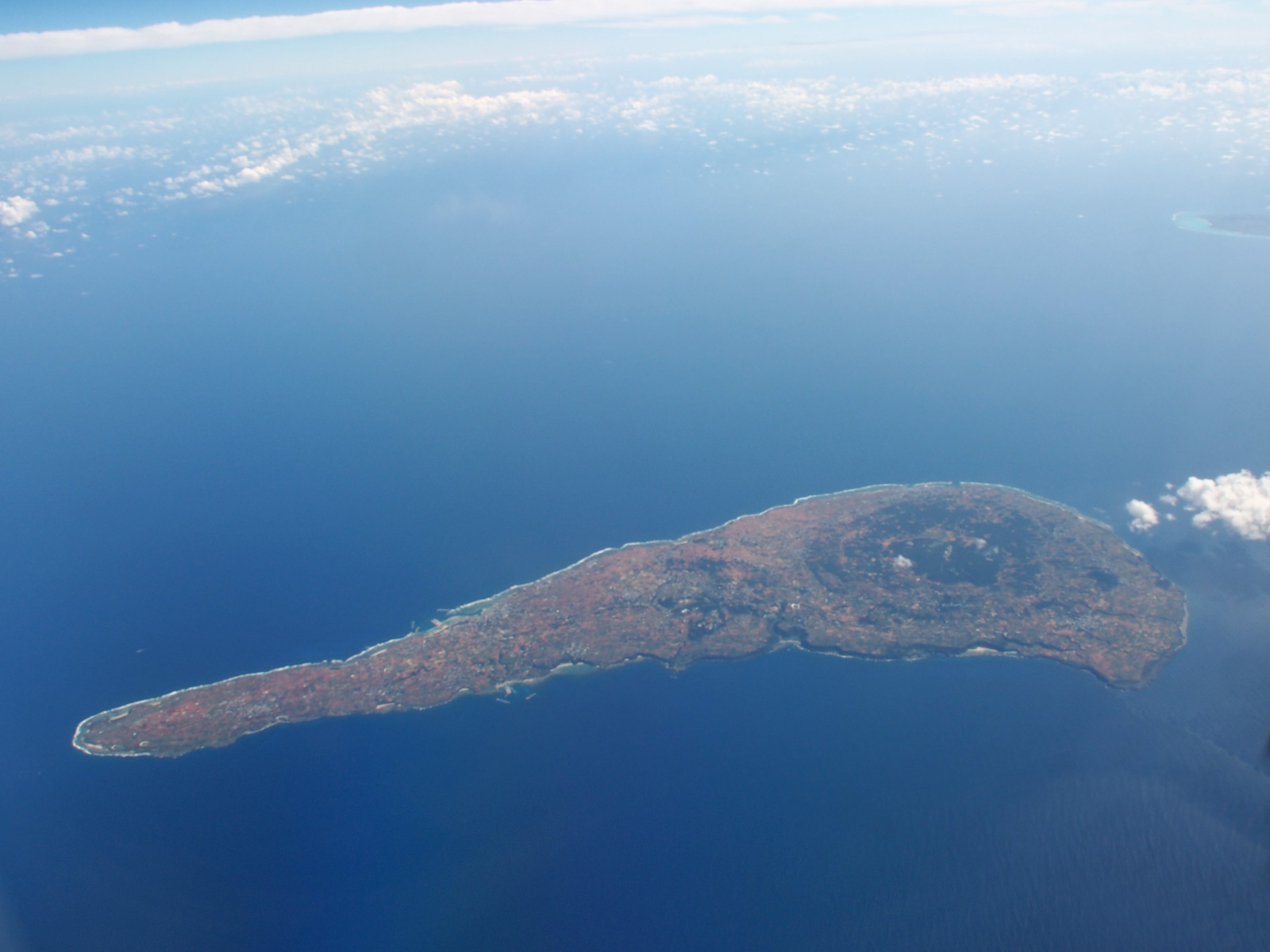
Okinoerabujima, the site of Saigō's second exile from 1862 to 1864

In mid-1862, Saigō was exiled again, this time to the even more remote and harsher island of Okinoerabujima, south of Amami. For the first six months, he was confined to an outdoor cage, exposed to the elements, and suffered greatly from ill health. He was later moved to house arrest through the intervention of local officials, particularly Tsuchimochi Masateru, who admired his character. During this second, more severe exile, Saigō dedicated himself to study, calligraphy, and teaching local children. He composed numerous Chinese poems reflecting on his situation, loyalty, and the concept of Heaven (ten), heavily influenced by the teachings of Satō Issai. He developed a philosophy where virtuous action, sincerity, and fulfilling one's Heaven-ordained duty, even unto death, were paramount. This period was crucial for his intellectual and spiritual maturation.

== Role in the Meiji Restoration ==
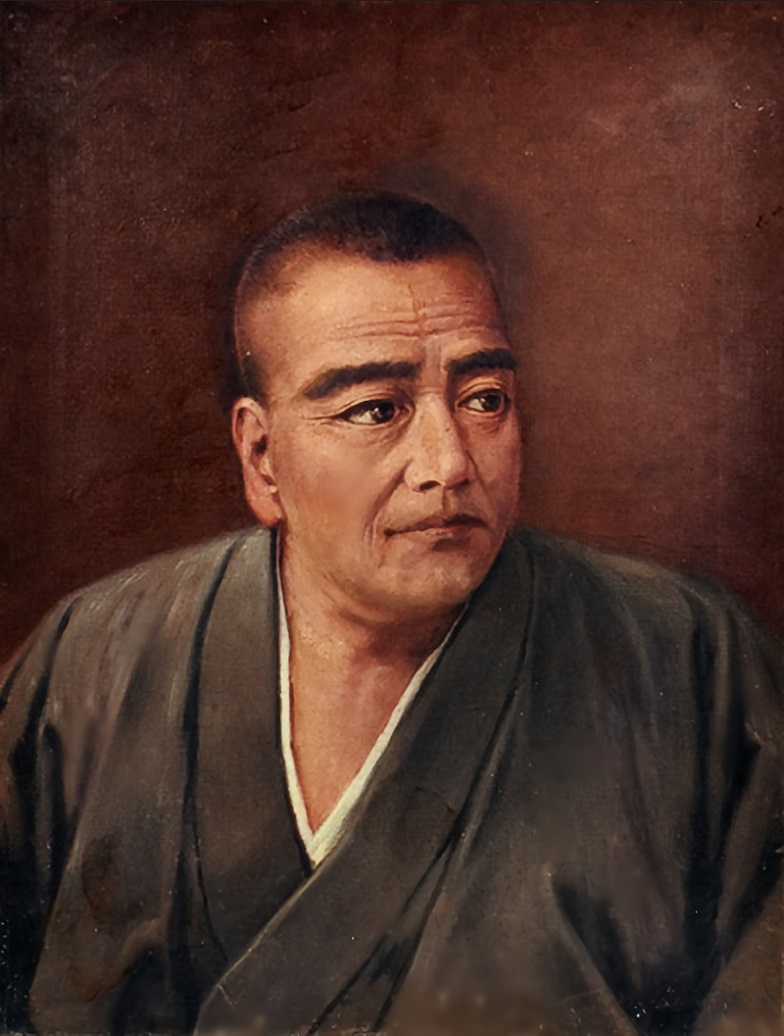
Posthumous portrait by Ishikawa Shizumasa

Saigō was pardoned and recalled from his second exile in early 1864, as Satsuma, under Hisamitsu and Ōkubo Toshimichi (Saigō's childhood friend), became increasingly involved in national politics. Saigō was initially sent to Kyoto, where he played a key role in the Kinmon incident of July 1864, in which Satsuma and Aizu forces repelled an attempt by Chōshū radicals to seize control of the Imperial Palace.

Despite Satsuma's role in defending the shogunate's interests in Kyoto, Saigō became increasingly convinced that the Tokugawa regime was beyond reform and incapable of uniting Japan against the threat of Western encroachment. His views were significantly influenced by his meeting with the shogunal official Katsu Kaishū in late 1864. Katsu persuaded Saigō that the shogunate was doomed and that a new government, possibly an alliance of powerful daimyō, was needed. Saigō then played a pivotal diplomatic role in the First Chōshū expedition, where, as chief of staff for the shogunal forces, he negotiated a lenient settlement that avoided a full-scale war and preserved Chōshū's strength.

This move laid the groundwork for the Satchō Alliance, a secret military pact between Satsuma and Chōshū, brokered by Sakamoto Ryōma of Tosa Domain in early 1866. When the shogunate launched a Second Chōshū expedition in mid-1866, Satsuma refused to participate, and Chōshū forces, modernized and well-led, inflicted a humiliating defeat on the shogunal armies. The death of Shōgun Iemochi and Emperor Kōmei in late 1866 and early 1867 further destabilized the political situation. Saigō, along with Ōkubo and Iwakura Tomomi, worked to secure an imperial edict for the overthrow of the shogunate.

In January 1868, the Boshin War began with the Battle of Toba–Fushimi, where Satsuma and Chōshū forces, fighting under the imperial banner, defeated the shogunal army. Saigō commanded the imperial forces in their eastward advance and, in a pivotal moment, negotiated the bloodless surrender of Edo Castle with Katsu Kaishū in April 1868, preventing a devastating urban battle. He continued to lead imperial forces in the campaigns against remaining shogunal loyalists in northern Japan, although his participation in the later stages of the war was hampered by ill health and a growing sense of disillusionment.

== Service in the Meiji government ==
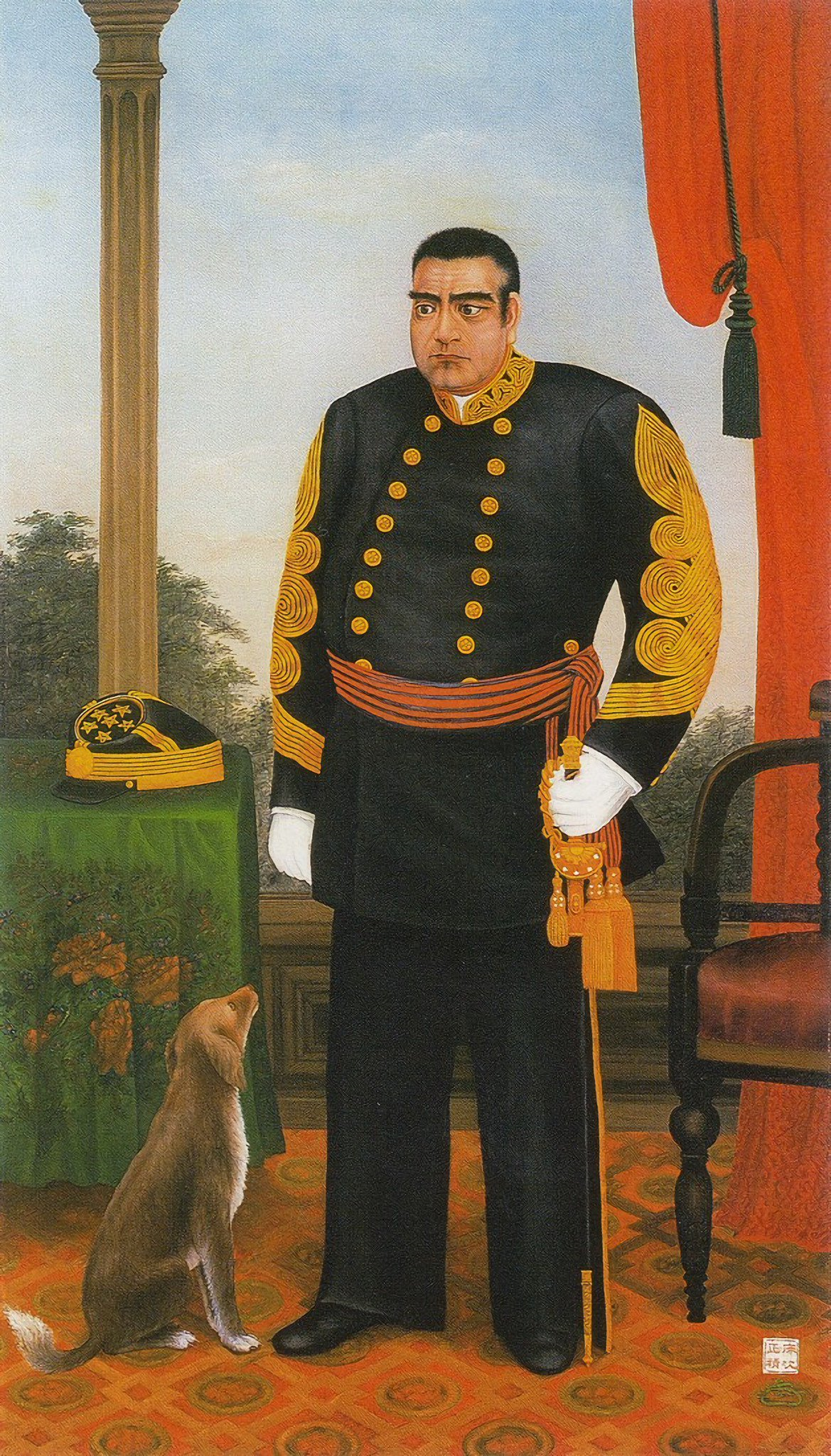
Portrait depicting Saigō in his field marshal uniform by Tokonami Masayoshi, 1887

Following the Meiji Restoration, Saigō initially played a significant role in the new imperial government. While he harbored a desire to retire to a simple life in Satsuma, he was persuaded to take on important responsibilities. In 1869, he became a domain councillor (sansei) in Satsuma, overseeing radical reforms that abolished traditional samurai status distinctions and restructured the domain's military and administration.

In early 1871, Saigō was summoned to Tokyo and became instrumental in the establishment of the Imperial Guard, a national army composed of troops from Satsuma, Chōshū, and Tosa. This force provided the military backing for the abolition of the han system (haihan chiken) in July 1871, a decisive step in centralizing power in Japan, which Saigō supported despite his personal loyalty to the Shimazu clan. When the Iwakura Mission departed for the West in late 1871, Saigō remained in Japan as a key figure in the caretaker government, holding positions including Imperial Councillor (sangi) and General in the army.

During this period, the caretaker government enacted major reforms, including the establishment of a national education system, legal reforms, and land tax reform. Saigō, however, grew increasingly uncomfortable with the pace and direction of Westernization, the burgeoning bureaucracy, and official corruption. His ideological opposition to extensive bureaucratic planning and his emphasis on moral leadership, rooted in Confucianism, clashed with the pragmatic nation-building efforts of colleagues like Ōkubo.

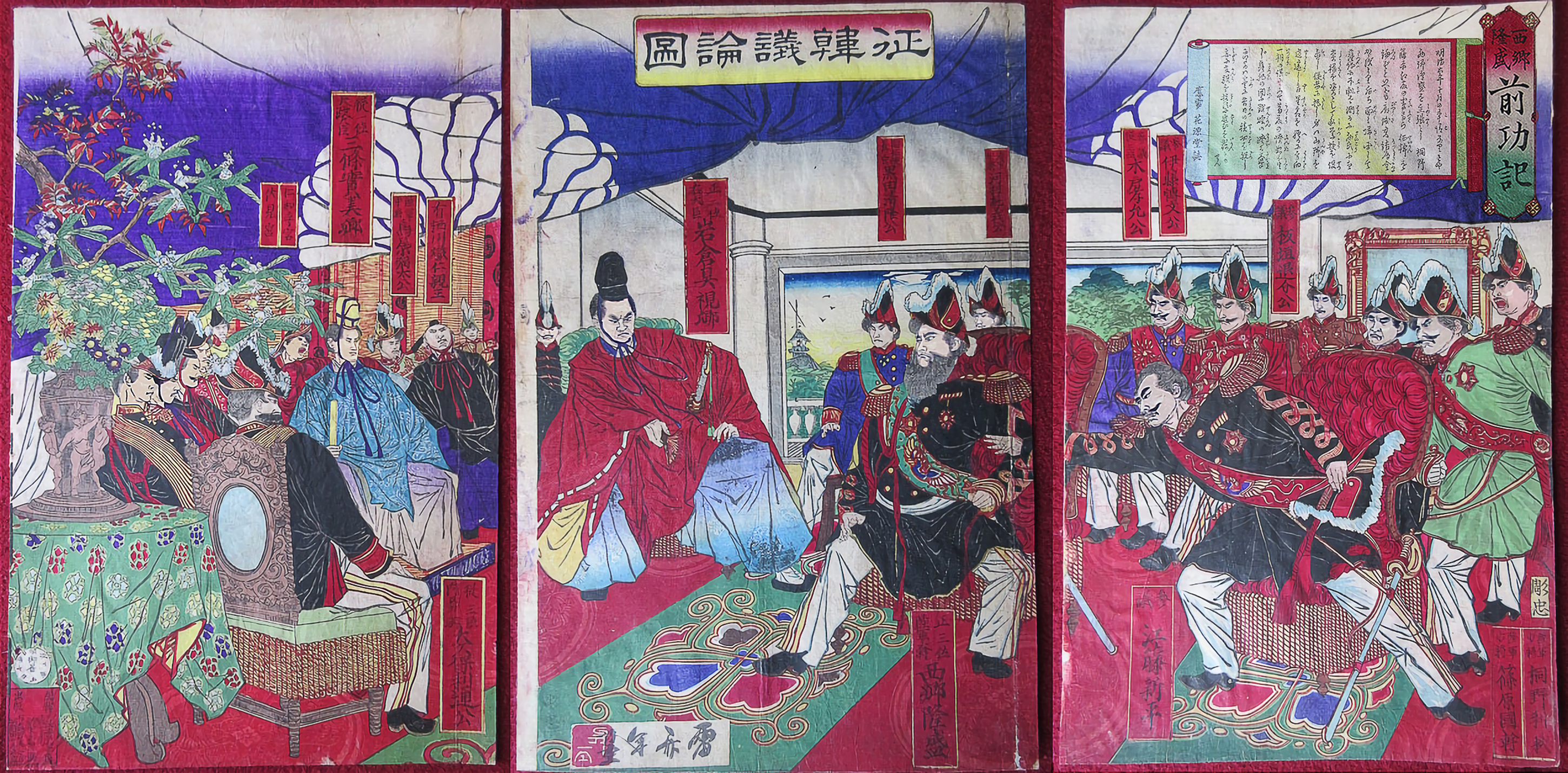
Ukiyo-e print depicting Saigō (seated, center right) during the Seikanron debate

The breaking point came in 1873 with the Seikanron (Debate over Invading Korea). When Korea refused to recognize the new Meiji government, Saigō advocated for being sent to Korea as an envoy, fully expecting that his uncompromising stance or even his assassination by Koreans would provide Japan with a just cause for war. The debate that followed was less about the specific policy toward Korea and more fundamentally about who would rule Japan: Saigō and the military-minded faction, or the reform bureaucrats led by Ōkubo and Kido. While Saigō's motivations were complex—ranging from a desire to uphold Japan's honor and provide an outlet for restless samurai to a personal quest for a meaningful death—his proposal was fiercely opposed by leaders like Ōkubo and Iwakura, who had recently returned from the West and prioritized domestic modernization over foreign adventures. When his plan was rejected in October 1873, Saigō resigned from all his government posts and returned to Kagoshima, followed by a significant number of military officers, bureaucrats, and members of the Imperial Guard, primarily from Satsuma.

== Return to Satsuma and the Satsuma Rebellion ==
Upon his return to Kagoshima, Saigō lived a relatively quiet life, indulging in his favorite pastimes of hunting and fishing, and showing little interest in directly re-entering politics. However, his immense prestige and the grievances of disaffected samurai who had followed him from Tokyo or been marginalized by Meiji reforms made him a natural rallying point for opposition to the central government. In 1874, he helped establish a system of private schools (shigakkō) in Kagoshima. These schools, while ostensibly for education and military training based on traditional samurai values, became centers of anti-government sentiment and nurtured a generation of young men fiercely loyal to Saigō and critical of the Tokyo regime. Saigō's educational philosophy emphasized Confucian universalism, suggesting that Japan could learn from the West while maintaining its own traditions, but he was wary of indiscriminate Westernization and the pursuit of "profit" over virtue.

Tensions between Satsuma and the Tokyo government escalated throughout 1876. The Meiji government's policies, including the conscription of commoners, the commutation of samurai stipends into government bonds (Chitsuroku shobun), and the ban on wearing swords, struck at the heart of samurai identity and privilege. Rebellions by disaffected samurai erupted in other parts of Japan, such as the Saga Rebellion (led by Etō Shimpei) and the Shinpūren Rebellion. Saigō watched these events with mixed emotions, sympathetic to the rebels' cause but hesitant to lead an open revolt himself.

Map of battles during the Satsuma Rebellion (1877)

In late January 1877, the situation in Kagoshima reached a crisis point. Alarmed by the stockpiling of weapons and the increasingly defiant attitude of the Shigakkō students, the central government attempted to remove munitions from Kagoshima's arsenal. This act, combined with rumors (later confirmed by a tortured confession) that government spies, including Nakahara Hisao, had been sent to assassinate Saigō, ignited the Satsuma Rebellion. The Shigakkō students, without Saigō's direct orders but moved by loyalty to him, seized the arsenal. Saigō, though reportedly appalled by their actions, felt compelled to lead them, vowing to die with them in battle. On 7 February, he announced his decision to march on Tokyo to "question" the central government.

The Satsuma army, numbering around 12,000 men at its outset but lacking logistical support, began its northward march on 15 February 1877. Their advance was halted at Kumamoto Castle, which was defended by an imperial garrison. The ensuing siege lasted for 54 days and proved a critical turning point, allowing the imperial government to mobilize a much larger and better-equipped national army. The rebels were decisively defeated at the Battle of Tabaruzaka in March, a grueling 18-day engagement where the imperial army's superior firepower and supply lines proved decisive.

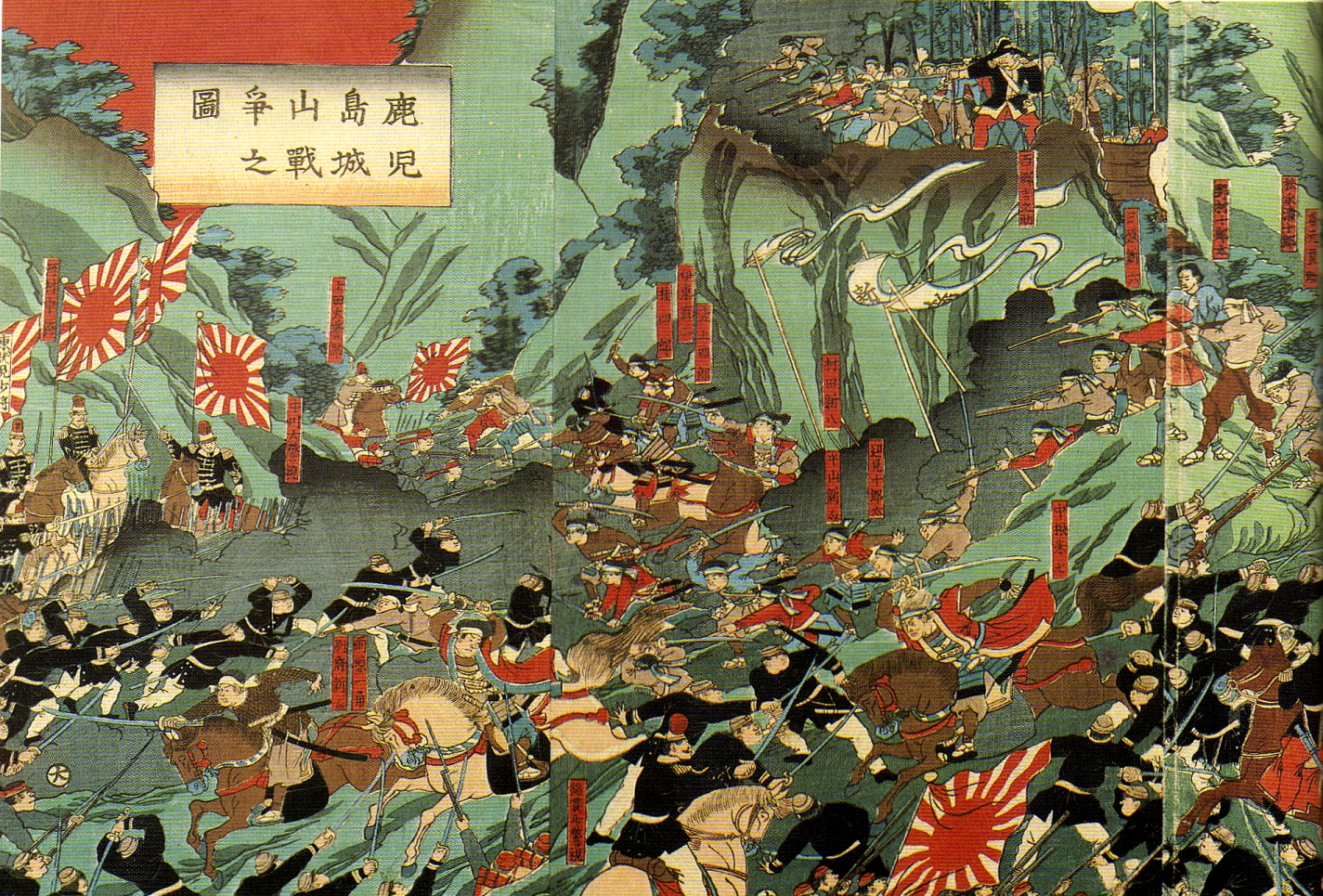
Ukiyo-e print depicting Saigō (on hill at top-right) directing his troops during the Battle of Shiroyama, the final battle of the Satsuma Rebellion

Forced to lift the siege of Kumamoto in April, Saigō's dwindling forces began a long and arduous retreat through Kyushu, pursued by the imperial army. Despite valiant fighting and skillful guerrilla tactics, the rebels were steadily worn down. By early September, Saigō, with only a few hundred men remaining, slipped back into Kagoshima and made a final stand on the hill of Shiroyama.

== Death ==
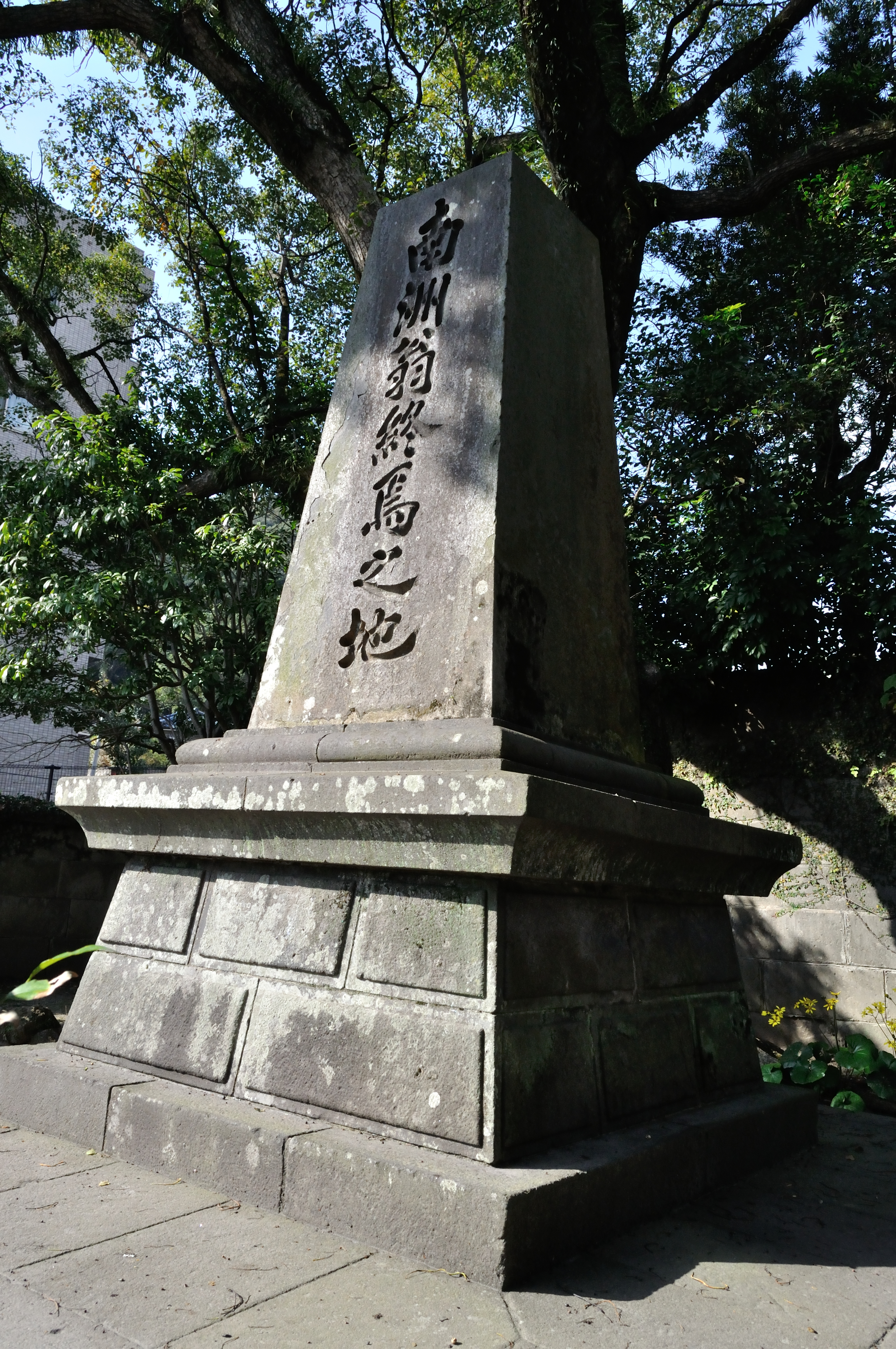
Monument marking the spot of Saigō's death on Shiroyama in Kagoshima

On the morning of 24 September 1877, the imperial army launched its final assault on Shiroyama. Vastly outnumbered and outgunned, Saigō's forces were quickly overwhelmed. During the fighting, Saigō was severely wounded in the hip and abdomen by a bullet. According to the most widely accepted accounts and legends, Saigō, unable to proceed, committed ritual suicide (seppuku). He turned to his close associate Beppu Shinsuke and said, "Shinsuke, I think this place will do. Please be my second (kaishakunin)." Saigō then calmly faced east towards the Imperial Palace, bent his head, and Beppu severed his head with a single sword stroke. Saigō's autopsy, however, revealed no wounds to his abdomen consistent with seppuku, suggesting he was likely too crippled by his gunshot wounds to perform the ritual and was beheaded by Beppu to prevent capture or a less honorable death.

Saigō's head was hidden by his manservant Kichizaemon to prevent it from falling into enemy hands, a common practice in samurai warfare to deny the victor a complete triumph. The imperial army, honoring ancient warrior traditions despite its modern nature, frantically searched for the head. It was eventually recovered later the same day, reportedly by an imperial army soldier named Maeda Tsunemitsu. Saigō's head was then unceremoniously rejoined with his body, which lay with other rebel leaders on a hill near the imperial army's barricades.

The death of Saigō, along with his chief lieutenants, effectively ended the Satsuma Rebellion. Within a year, all three of the principal leaders of the Meiji Restoration were dead: Kido Takayoshi had died of illness during the rebellion in May 1877, Saigō died in battle on 24 September 1877, and Ōkubo Toshimichi was assassinated in May 1878 by samurai resentful of his role in suppressing the rebellion. The passing of these founding figures marked the end of the initial, tumultuous phase of the Restoration, leaving their successors to complete the institutionalization of the Meiji state.

== Personal life ==
Saigō was married three times. His first marriage in 1852 to Ijuin Suga, arranged by his family, was short-lived and ended in annulment after two years when Saigō was transferred to Edo. He reportedly expressed little interest in sex, and the divorce led him to a period of sexual self-denial.

During his first exile on Amami Ōshima, he married Aigana (born Otoma Kane), a local woman from a prominent island family, in 1859. She was described as beautiful but was illiterate and had the traditional tattooed hands of Amami women. They had a son, Kikujirō (born 1861), and a daughter, Kikusō (born c. 1862). Saigō reportedly enjoyed his life with Aigana and their children, later writing that his family on Amami was a source of great happiness. He left Amami in 1862 and never saw Aigana again, though their children eventually joined him in Kagoshima.

In 1865, after his rise to national prominence, Saigō married Iwayama Ito, the daughter of a Satsuma domain official, a prestigious match. With Ito, he had three sons: Toratarō, Umajirō (son), and Torizō. Their marriage was described as harmonious but apparently lacked deep intimacy. Saigō is also reported to have had a favored geisha in Kyoto known as "Princess Pig" (Butahime) due to her portly figure, a match for Saigō's own considerable size.

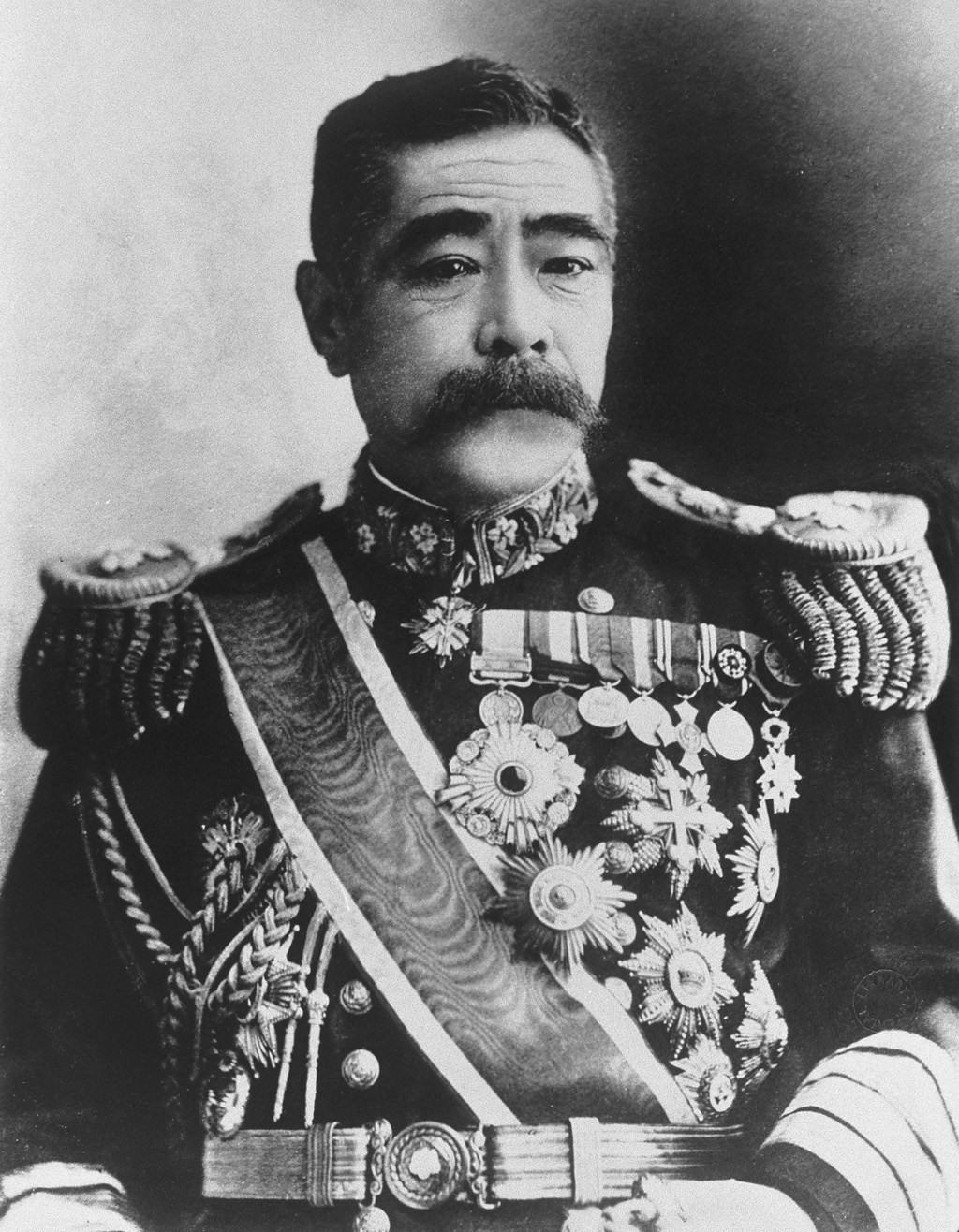
Saigō Jūdō (1843–1902), Takamori's brother

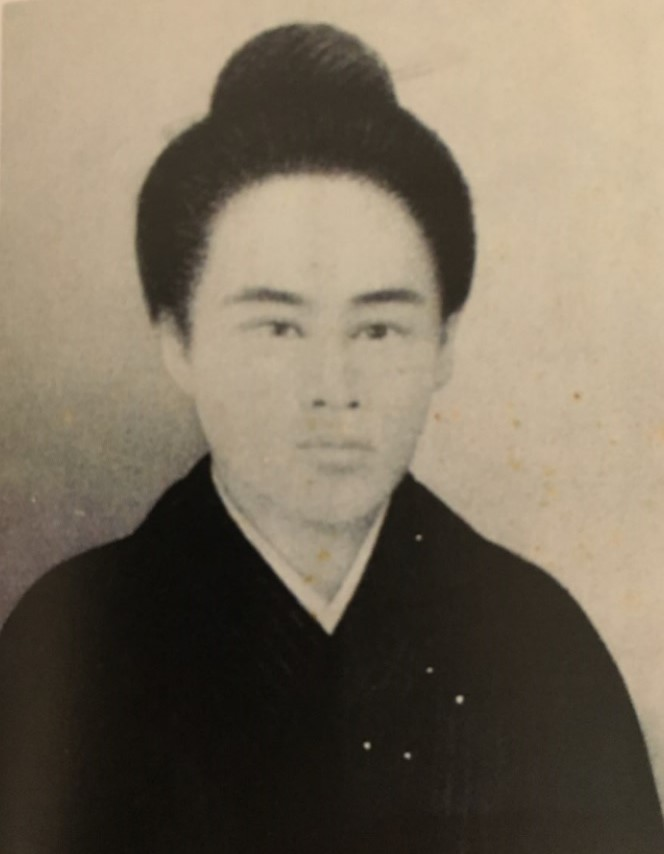
Aigana (1837–1902), Saigō Takamori's second wife

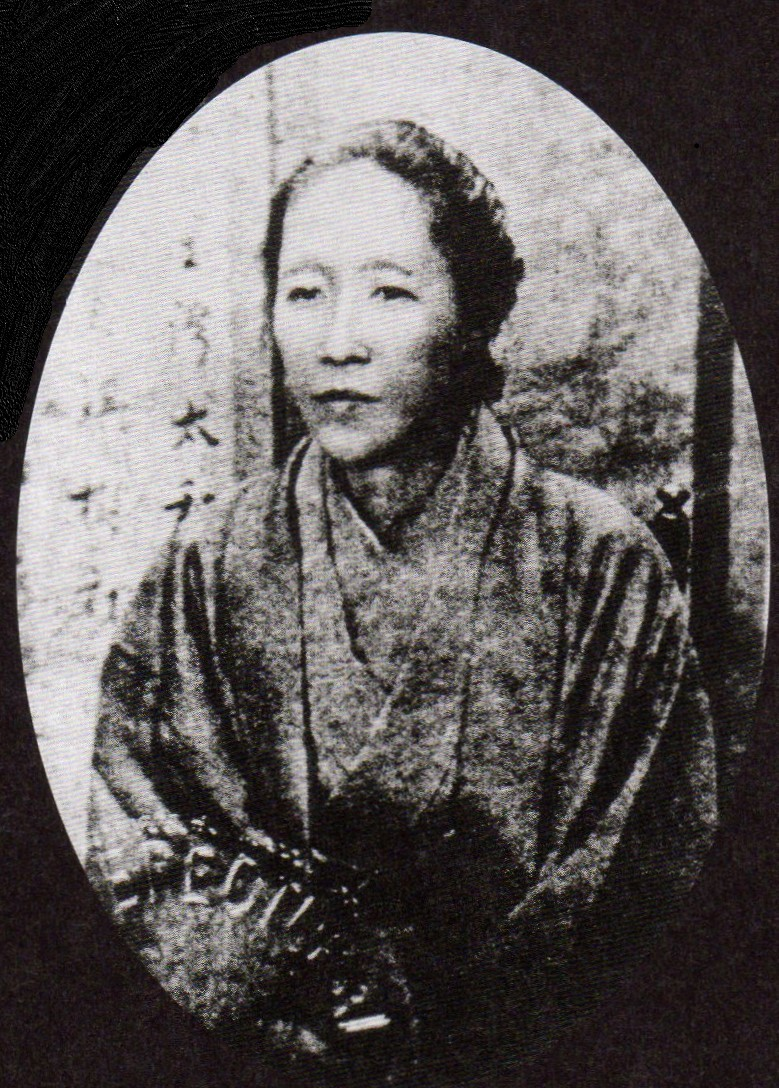
Saigō Ito (1843–1922), his third wife

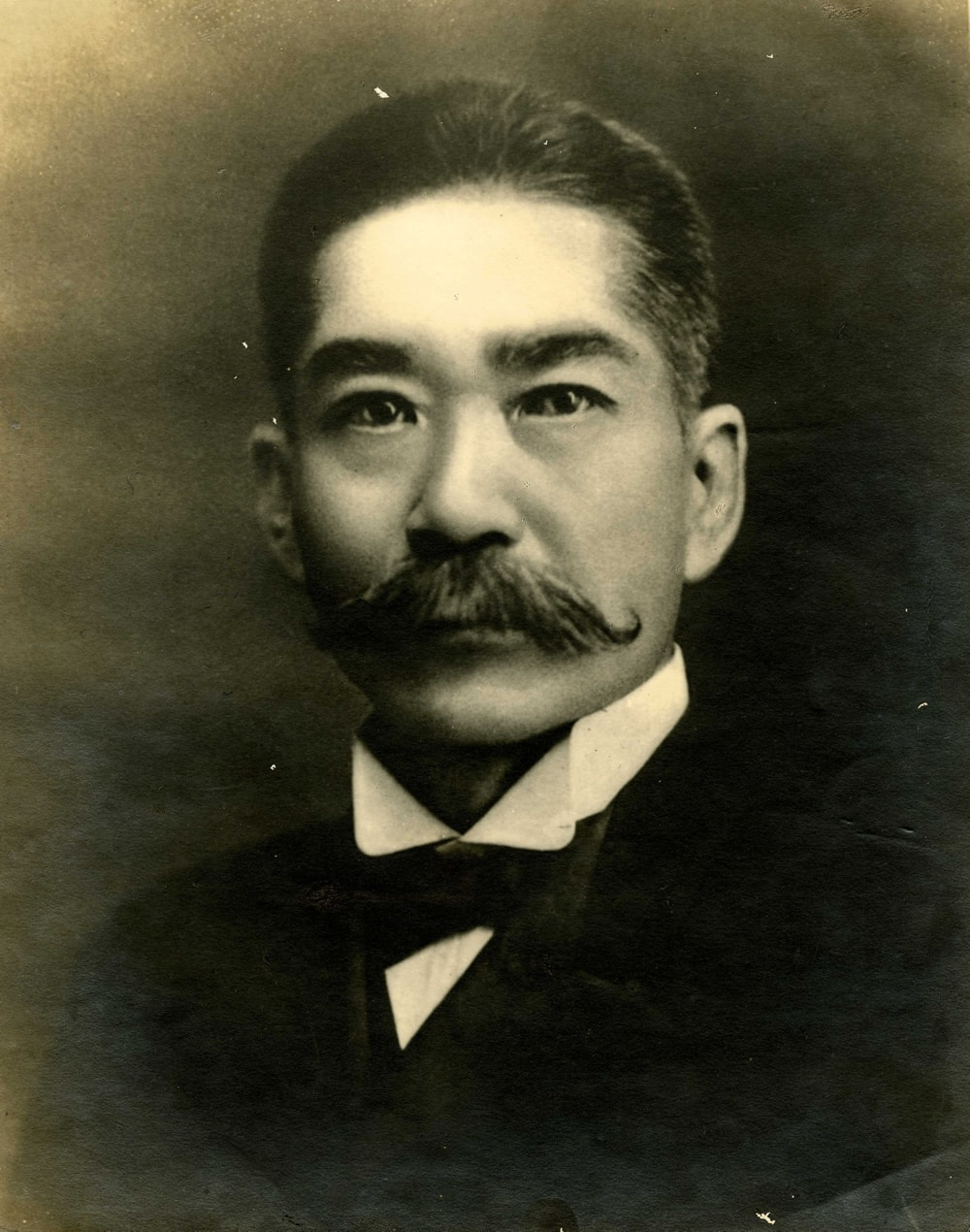
Saigō Kikujirō (1861–1928), his oldest son

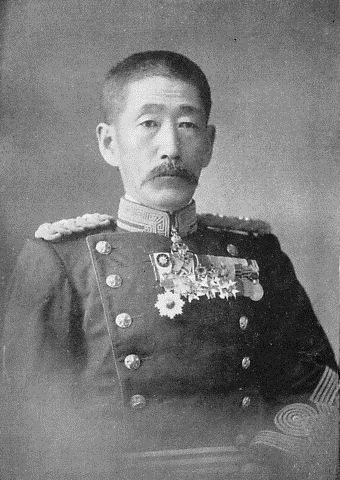
Saigō Toratarō (1866–1919), his second son

At a time when the average Japanese man stood about 5 feet 1 inch tall, Saigō was physically imposing, standing nearly six feet (c. 182 cm) tall and possessed a powerful, wrestler-like physique, leading contemporaries to describe him as "Herculean." He suffered from various health problems throughout his life, including filariasis, which led to dropsy of the scrotum and significant weight gain. In his later years, he also experienced severe angina due to arteriosclerosis. He had a quick, fiery temperament, but was also known for his stoicism and an intimidating taciturn gaze. Despite this, he possessed a deep sentimentality, known to weep openly at sentimental plays. His favorite pastimes included hunting with his dogs and fishing, and he enjoyed making his own hunting sandals from straw and his own fishing lures. He preferred simple, traditional pleasures and disliked the elaborate Western-style clothing and entertainments adopted by many of his Meiji-era contemporaries.

== Legacy ==
Saigō Takamori's death marked the end of the last major armed uprising against the Meiji government and solidified the authority of the centralized state. Despite being a rebel leader, his image quickly transformed into that of a tragic hero and a symbol of true samurai spirit. He is often referred to as "the last true samurai."

Popular mythology surrounding Saigō flourished even before his death and intensified afterwards. Legends claimed he had not died but had escaped to China or India, or that he had ascended to the heavens and become the planet Mars or a comet. Woodblock prints (nishiki-e) depicted him in heroic poses, often in full imperial army uniform despite his rebel status, or as an enlightened being attaining nirvana, surrounded by grieving commoners and animals, paralleling depictions of the Buddha. These images reflected a deep public sympathy for Saigō and a desire to see him as a virtuous figure, even a demigod, who stood for traditional values against a rapidly modernizing and sometimes perceived as corrupt government. His untimely death ensured his memory was not "contaminated by the compromises that practical politics required of those who survived." He became a "Protean figure, large in life and larger in death, with a legacy for would-be populists as well as militarists." The government, initially hostile, eventually embraced Saigō's legend. On 22 February 1889, as part of a general amnesty commemorating the promulgation of the Meiji Constitution, Saigō was posthumously pardoned and his imperial court rank restored. He was subsequently transformed into an exemplar of Japanese virtue in school textbooks.

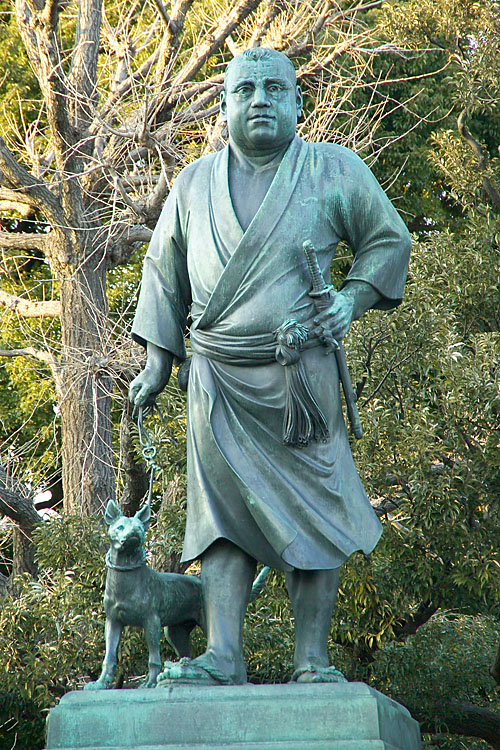
The statue of Saigō Takamori in Ueno Park, Tokyo

The most famous public monument to Saigō is the bronze statue in Ueno Park, Tokyo, unveiled in 1898. It depicts him in simple attire with his dog, reflecting his love of hunting and his common touch, rather than as a statesman or military leader. This portrayal has been influential in shaping his popular image.

Saigō Takamori's life and actions have been subject to numerous interpretations. He has been seen as a selfless patriot, a tragic hero, a reactionary feudalist, a principled conservative, and a champion of the oppressed. His insistence on moral principles in politics, his loyalty, his courage, and his ultimate failure against the forces of modernization have contributed to his enduring appeal. His story continues to be retold in various media, reflecting an ongoing engagement with his complex legacy and what he represents about Japanese identity and history. His image, often detached from the historical reality, serves as an "empty symbolic vessel" that can be filled with various meanings to suit contemporary ideological needs.

== See also ==
- The Last Samurai
