= Siege of Kumamoto Castle =

1877 Japanese military event

Coordinates: 32.8°N 130.7°E

- Part of the Satsuma Rebellion
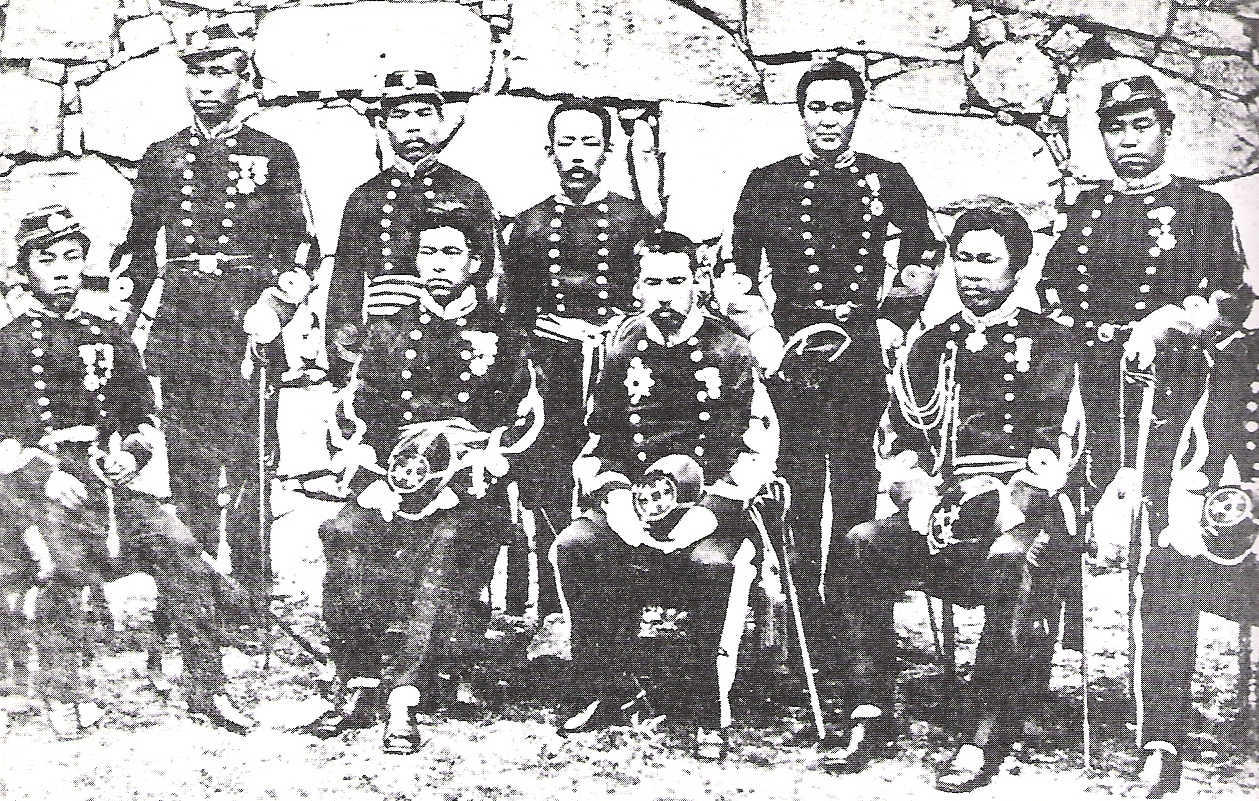
- Imperial Japanese Army officers of the Kumamoto garrison, Unknown photographer
Date	19 February – 12 April 1877
Location	Kumamoto, Kumamoto Prefecture, Japan
Result	Imperial victory

Belligerents
Japan	Satsuma Domain

Commanders and leaders
(Empire of Japan) Tani Tateki (Empire of Japan) Yamagata Aritomo (Empire of Japan) Kuroda Kiyotaka	(Satsuma Domain) Saigō Takamori

Strength
Kumamoto garrison: 4,400; Later reinforcements: 90,000	20,000

Casualties and losses
Unknown	Unknown

The siege of Kumamoto Castle (熊本城強襲, Kumamotojō kyōshū) from February 19 to April 12, 1877, in Kumamoto, Japan, was a major battle of the Satsuma Rebellion.

== Summary ==
After the opening of hostilities between Satsuma and the Meiji government, Satsuma military leader Saigō Takamori announced his intention of marching on Tokyo to speak with Emperor Meiji and to rid the government of corrupt and venal politicians. The route to Tokyo was via Kumamoto, the site of a historic castle, and the primary garrison town for the Imperial Japanese Army in Kyūshū. The leaders of the Meiji government were aware that the loss of Kumamoto meant that all of Kyūshū would fall to Satsuma forces, and this loss would fan a rebellion across other parts of Japan as well.

The Satsuma vanguard crossed into Kumamoto Prefecture on February 14 and the Commandant of Kumamoto Castle, Major General Tani Tateki sent word to Satsuma governor Oyama that any attempt by Satsuma soldiers to cross Kumamoto would be met by force. Tani had 3,800 soldiers and 600 policemen at his disposal. The defenders included a number of men who would later rise to positions of great prominence in the Japanese military, including Kabayama Sukenori, Kodama Gentarō, Kawakami Soroku, Nogi Maresuke and Oku Yasukata. However, as most of the garrison of Kumamoto castle was from Kyūshū, and as many of the officers were natives of Kagoshima, their loyalties were open to question. Rather than risk desertions or defections, Tani decided to stand on the defensive.

On February 19, the first shots of the war were fired as the defenders of Kumamoto castle opened fire on Satsuma units attempting to force their way into the castle. Kumamoto castle, built in 1467, was among the strongest in Japan, Saigō was confident that his forces would be more than a match for Tani's peasant conscripts, who were still demoralized by the recent Shinpūren Rebellion.

On February 22, the main Satsuma army arrived and attacked Kumamoto castle in a pincer movement. Fighting continued into the night. Imperial forces fell back, and Acting Major Nogi Maresuke of the Kokura Fourteenth Regiment lost its regimental colours in fierce fighting. However, despite their successes, the Satsuma army failed to take the castle, and began to realize that the conscript army was not as ineffective as first assumed. After two days of fruitless attack, the Satsuma forces dug into the rock-hard icy ground around the castle and tried to starve the garrison out in a siege. The situation grew especially desperate for the defenders as their stores of food and ammunition had been depleted by a warehouse fire shortly before the rebellion began.

A rebel detachment sent to block the passes north of town soon encountered the forward elements of the relief force. After several sharp clashes, both sides disengaged on February 26.

During the siege, many Kumamoto ex-samurai flocked to Saigō's banner, swelling his forces to around 20,000 men. However, Saigō was forced to divide his troops to hold a long defensive line from Tabaruzaka to the Bay of Ariake. In the Battle of Tabaruzaka, some 15,000 of his samurai faced an Imperial army of over 90,000 men and were forced to retreat with significant losses. In addition, Saigō was unable to prevent the landing of troops to his rear and the loss of Kagoshima itself as a base for supplies and reinforcement.

On the night of April 8, a force from Kumamoto castle made a sortie, forcing open a hole in the Satsuma lines and enabling desperately needed supplies to reach the garrison. The main Imperial Army, under General Kuroda Kiyotaka with the assistance of General Yamakawa Hiroshi arrived in Kumamoto on April 12, putting the now heavily outnumbered Satsuma forces to flight.

== Consequences ==
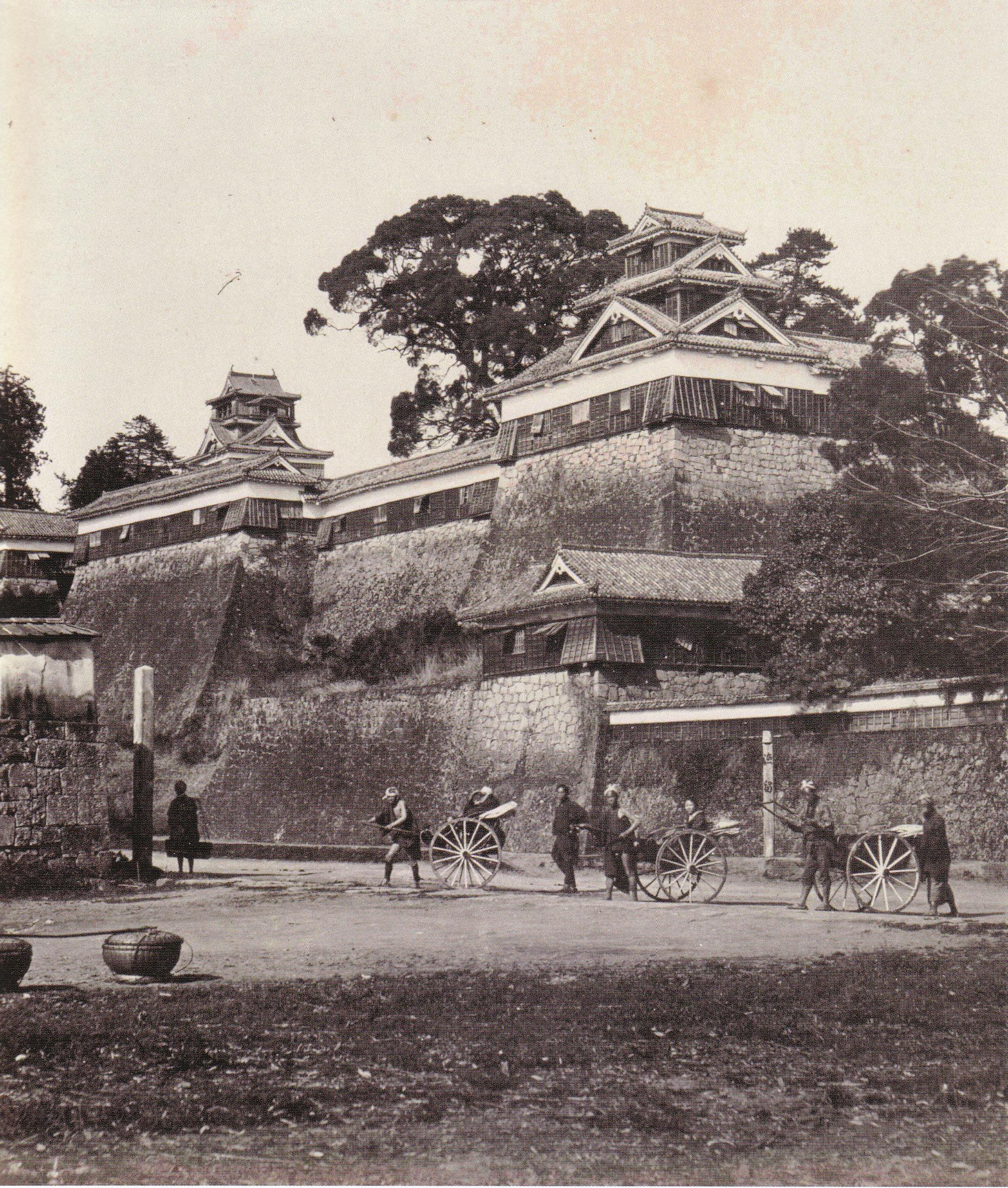
1874 picture of Kumamoto Castle.

The defeat of Saigō at Kumamoto greatly demoralized and weakened his forces, who retreated in disarray and were unable to resume their offensive. Although Saigō fought in several more battles before the final Battle of Shiroyama, each battle was fought as a defensive operation with dwindling manpower and supplies against ever-increasing numbers of Imperial troops.

== Depiction in artworks ==
A Japanese hand fan commemorating the event, which survives in the collection of the Staten Island Historical Society in New York, features a depiction of Saigō in a scene labeled (in English) "The Battle Near the Citadel of Kumamoto".
