= Battle of Shiroyama =

1877 final battle of the Satsuma Rebellion

Coordinates: 31°35′50″N 130°32′59″E

- Part of the Satsuma Rebellion
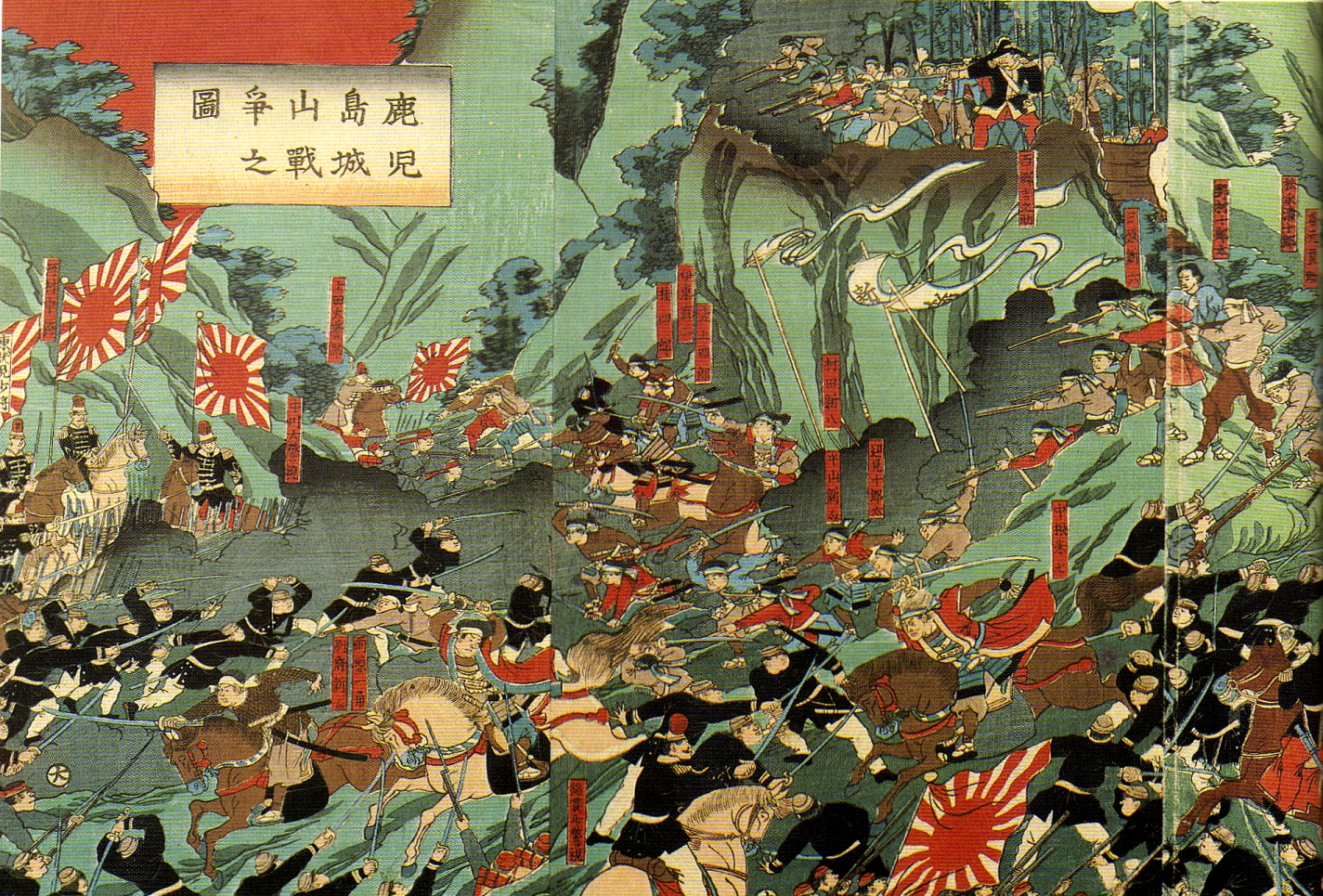
- Battle of Shiroyama, Unknown artist
Date	24 September 1877
Location	Kagoshima, Kagoshima Prefecture, Japan
Result	Imperial victory

Belligerents
Japan	Satsuma Domain

Commanders and leaders
(Empire of Japan) Yamagata Aritomo	(Satsuma Domain) Saigō Takamori ‡‡

Strength
30,000	500

Casualties and losses
30 killed	500 killed

The Battle of Shiroyama (城山の戦い, Shiroyama no tatakai) took place on 24 September 1877, in Kagoshima, Japan. It was the final battle of the Satsuma Rebellion, where the heavily outnumbered samurai under Saigō Takamori made their last stand against Imperial Japanese Army troops under the command of General Yamagata Aritomo and Admiral Kawamura Sumiyoshi. The battle culminated in the annihilation of Saigō and his army, marking the end of the Satsuma Rebellion. The Imperial Army's victory consolidated their power, and the Satsuma Rebellion was the last instance of internal mutiny seen in the Empire of Japan.

== Battle ==
Following their defeat at the Siege of Kumamoto Castle and in other battles in central Kyūshū, the surviving remnants of the samurai forces loyal to Saigō Takamori fled back to Satsuma, seizing the hill of Shiroyama overlooking Kagoshima on 1 September 1877.

Imperial army troops under the command of General Yamagata Aritomo and marines under the command of Admiral Kawamura Sumiyoshi began arriving soon after, and the rebels were promptly surrounded. In the mere six months since Saigō's failed Siege of Kumamoto Castle, a combination of defections and combat losses had shrunk the size of his army from 20,000 to 500, compared to the Imperial Army's 30,000.

Yamagata, although greatly outnumbering Saigō, bided his time constructing a series of fortifications to encircle Saigō and prevent any chance of a breakout, additionally requisitioning five warships to bombard the rebels and reduce their defenses. He was planning an attack from all sides, and in an effort to prevent another escape, ordered that any position engaged by the enemy was to be fired upon, regardless of friendly casualties.

On 23 September, Admiral Kawamura Sumiyoshi demanded an unconditional surrender of the samurai, promising to spare their lives if they offered Saigō, and that they would attack the rebel position if no response was given by 5pm that day. Following silence from the camp, he began to attack the position, causing devastation amongst the samurai who did not expect such a heavy bombardment. Saigō defended his position with limited support from Snider-Enfield breechloaders and artillery, but had a critical lack of ammunition for both. He had to resort to melting down metal statues to produce bullets and tending to injuries with a carpenter's saw.

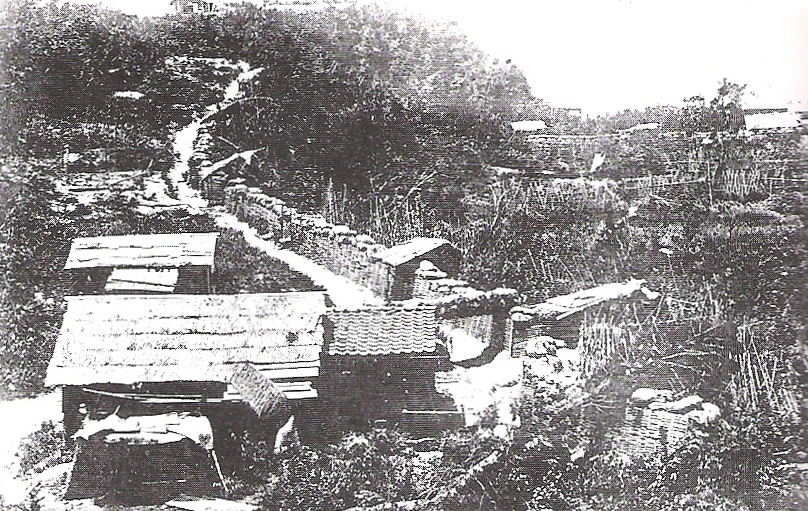
Imperial Japanese Army fortifications encircling Shiroyama, September 1877.

After firing a final barrage of artillery lasting the night, Yamagata's men attacked Saigō's position. At 04:00, the battle began. For a short time, Saigō's lines held, but were forced back due to being outnumbered. Saigō was mortally wounded in the femoral artery and stomach, and was carried by Beppu Shinsuke downhill to find a place to commit seppuku. Serving as kaishakunin, Beppu cut off Saigō's head and hid it to prevent it from being found by the enemy. However, because the decapitation was done hastily, some of Saigō's hair remained, and a coolie was able to find his head. After Saigō's death, Beppu, now in command, charged downhill and was shot to death himself – without any ammunition, the rest of the samurai drew their swords, charged downhill, and were subsequently killed. With these deaths, the Satsuma rebellion came to an end.

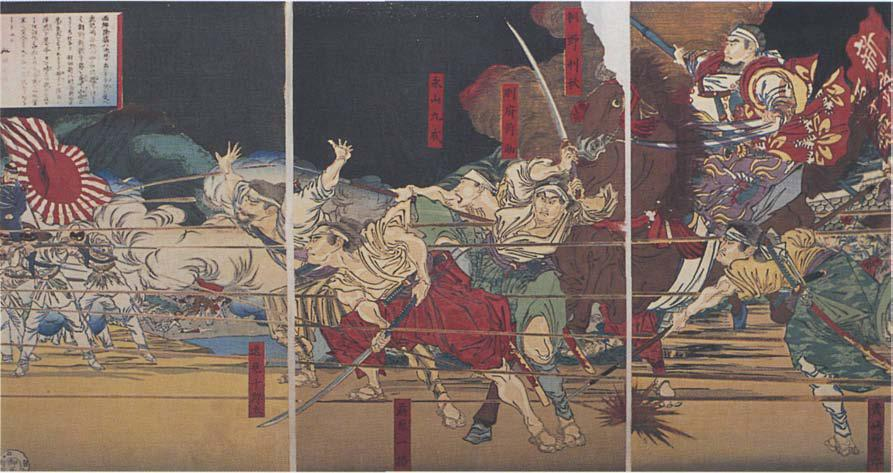
Saigō, with the last remnants of the Satsuma army, leads a desperate suicide charge.

== Aftermath ==
Financially, crushing the Satsuma Rebellion cost the government a total of ¥420,000,000 (£8,400,000), forcing Japan off the gold standard and causing the government to print paper currency. Economic effects of the Satsuma Rebellion resulted in the passing of the Act of 4 February 1877, which reduced the land tax from 3% to 2.5%. The Rebellion reduced Japan's yearly expenditure from £13,700,000 to £10,250,000, and it raised Japan's national debt from £28,000,000 to £70,000,000.

The rebellion also effectively ended the samurai class, as the new Imperial Japanese Army built on heimin conscripts had proven itself in battle. More critically, the defeat of the samurai displayed the power of modern artillery and rifles, against which a banzai charge had no appreciable effect. In 1889, the Meiji-era government posthumously pardoned Saigō. Statues in Ueno Park, Tokyo and near the ruins of Kagoshima Castle stand in his memory. Saigō Takamori was labelled as a tragic hero by the people, and his actions were considered an honorable example of bushido and Yamato-damashii.

== In popular culture ==
The battle and actions of Takamori are depicted in the final scenes of the 2003 American film, The Last Samurai, directed by Edward Zwick.

The song "Shiroyama" on the album The Last Stand by the Swedish power metal band Sabaton is about the battle of Shiroyama.
