= Mount Shiroyama (Kagoshima) =

Mountain in Kagoshima Prefecture, Japan

Coordinates: 31°35′50″N 130°32′59″E

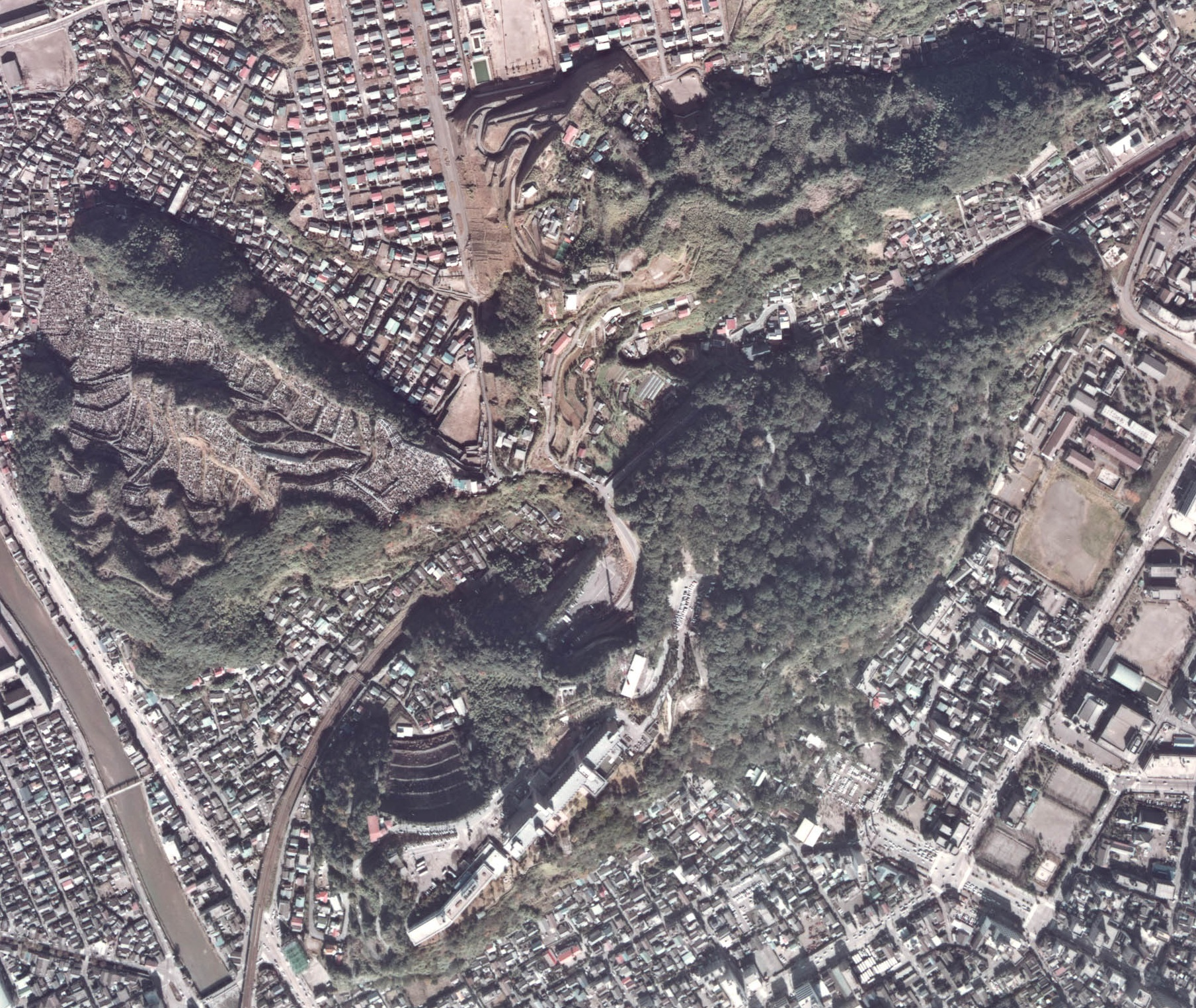
Aerial view around Shiroyama

Mount Shiroyama (城山, Shiroyama) is a mountain located in Kagoshima, Kagoshima Prefecture, Japan. The true height is 107m. The original name is Tsuru ga mine (鶴ヶ峯, Tsuru ga mine) The mountain is famous as the site of the Battle of Shiroyama in 1877, at the end of the Satsuma rebellion.
