= List of war films and TV specials set between 1775 and 1914 =

War depictions in film and television include documentaries, TV mini-series, and drama serials depicting aspects of historical wars, the films included here are films set in the period from 1775 or at the beginning of the Age of Revolution and until various Empires hit roadblock in 1914, after lengthy arms race for several years.

== American Revolutionary War (1775–1783) ==
(Also see American Revolutionary War films, List of films about the American Revolution)

- Betsy Ross (1917)
- The Spirit of '76 (1917)
- America (1924)
- Alexander Hamilton (1931)
- The Pursuit of Happiness (1934)
- Daniel Boone (1936)
- Drums Along the Mohawk (1939)
- The Howards of Virginia (1940)
- Where Do We Go from Here? (1945)
- The Time of Their Lives (1946)
- Sangaree (1953)
- The Scarlet Coat (1955)
- Johnny Tremain (1957)
- The Devil's Disciple (1959)
- John Paul Jones (1959)
- La Fayette (1961)
- 1776 (1972)
- Valley Forge (1975), (TV film)
- The Bastard (1978), (TV film)
- The Rebels (1979), (TV film)
- The Seekers (1979), (TV film)
- George Washington (1984), (TV miniseries)
- Revolution (1985)
- The Devil's Disciple (1987), (TV film)
- April Morning (1988), (TV film)
- The Broken Chain (1993), (TV film)
- The Patriot (2000)
- The Crossing (2000), (TV film)
- Benedict Arnold: A Question of Honor (2002), (TV film)
- John Adams (2008), (TV miniseries)
- Turn: Washington's Spies (2014–2017), (TV series)
- Sons of Liberty (2015), (TV miniseries)
- Beyond the Mask (2015)

== French Revolutionary Wars (1792–1802) ==
(also see List of films set during the French Revolution and French Revolutionary Wars)

- A Tale of Two Cities (1917)
- Orphans of the Storm (1921)
- Scaramouche (1923)
- Captain of the Guard (1930)
- The Scarlet Pimpernel (1934)
- A Tale of Two Cities (1935)
- Return of the Scarlet Pimpernel (1937)
- La Marseillaise (1938)
- Marie Antoinette (1938)
- New Moon (1940)
- Reign of Terror (1949)
- The Elusive Pimpernel (1950)
- Scaramouche (1952)
- Dangerous Exile (1957)
- A Tale of Two Cities (1958)
- Start the Revolution Without Me (1970)
- A Tale of Two Cities (1980)
- History of the World, Part I (1981)
- The Scarlet Pimpernel (1982)
- Danton (1983)
- Adieu Bonaparte (1985)
- Napoleon and Josephine: A Love Story (1987), (TV miniseries)
- Chouans! (1988)
- Highlander III: The Sorcerer (1994)
- Passion in the Desert (1997)
- War in the Highlands (1999)
- Hornblower (1998–2003), (TV series) – first six episodes (The Duel, The Fire Ships, The Duchess and the Devil, The Wrong War, Mutiny, Retribution)
- Napoleon (2002) (TV miniseries)
- Vaincre ou mourir (2023)
- Napoleon (2023)

== First Barbary War (1801–1805) ==
- Old Ironsides (1926)
- Tripoli (1950)

== Napoleonic Wars (1803–1815) ==
(also see List of Napoleonic Wars films)

- War and Peace (1915)
- A Royal Divorce (1926)
- Napoléon (1927)
- The House of Rothschild (1934)
- The Iron Duke (1934)
- Lloyd's of London (1936)
- Conquest (1937)
- A Royal Divorce (1938)
- The Blue Bird (1940)
- Swiss Family Robinson (1940)
- The Rothschilds (1940)
- That Hamilton Woman (1941)
- The Young Mr. Pitt (1942)
- Kolberg (1945)
- Captain Horatio Hornblower (1951)
- The Red and the Black (1954)
- Napoléon (1955)
- War and Peace (1956)
- The Pride and the Passion (1957)
- Sven Tuuva the Hero (1958)
- Austerlitz (1960)
- Madame Sans-Gêne (1961)
- War and Peace (1966–67)
- Waterloo (1970)
- The Guerrilla (1973)
- Napoleon and Love (1974)
- Love and Death (1975)
- The Duellists (1977)
- Raffl (1984)
- Bagrationi (1985)
- Napoleon and Josephine: A Love Story (1987), (TV series)
- La Révolution Française (1989)
- Pan Tadeusz (1999)
- Sharpe (1993–2006), (TV series)
- Hornblower (1998–2003 TV series) – last two episodes (Loyalty, Duty)
- The Emperor's New Clothes (2001)
- Napoleon (2002) (TV miniseries)
- War and Peace (2002)
- Master and Commander: The Far Side of the World (2003)
- Monsieur N (2003)
- The Brothers Grimm (2004)
- Napoleon and Me (2006)
- War and Peace (2007)
- The Ballad of Uhlans (2012)
- Lines of Wellington (2012)
- War & Peace (2016)
- Napoleon (2023)

== War of 1812 ==
- The Buccaneer (1938)
- Captain Caution (1940)
- Magnificent Doll (1946)
- Last of the Buccaneers (1950)
- Mutiny! (1952)
- The President's Lady (1953)
- The Buccaneer (1958)

== Italian unification (1815–1871) ==
- 1860 (1934)
- Red Shirts (1952)
- Senso (1954)
- Garibaldi (1961)
- The Italian Brigands (1962)
- The Leopard (1963)
- In the Name of the Sovereign People (1990)
- Noi credevamo (2010)

== Second Serbian Uprising (1815–1817) ==
- Vuk Karadžić (1987), (TV series)

== Caucasian War (1817–1864) ==
- The White Devil (1930)
- The White Warrior (1959)

== Era of Hungarian Betyár (18–19th century) ==
- Sárga rózsa (1940)

== Arikara War (1823) ==
- The Revenant (2015)

== Decembrist revolt (1825) ==
- Union of Salvation (2019)

== Java War (1825-1830) ==
- November 1828 (1979)

== Texas War of Independence (1835–1836) ==
- The Immortal Alamo (1911)
- Martyrs of the Alamo (1915)
- Davy Crockett at the Fall of the Alamo (1925)
- The Alamo (1936)
- Heroes of the Alamo (1937)
- The Alamo: Shrine of Texas Liberty (1938)
- Man of Conquest (1939)
- The Man from the Alamo (1953)
- Davy Crockett, King of the Wild Frontier (1955)
- The Last Command (1955)
- The First Texan (1956)
- The Alamo (1960)
- The Alamo: Thirteen Days to Glory (1987)
- Texas (1994), (TV film)
- Alamo: The Price of Freedom (1988)
- Two for Texas (1998), (TV film)
- The Alamo (2004)
- Texas Rising (2015), (TV miniseries)

== Opium Wars: First Opium War (1839–1842) Second Opium War (1856–1860) ==
- Ahen senso (1943)
- Eternity (1943)
- The Burning of the Imperial Palace (1983), (TV miniseries)
- The Opium War (1997)
- The King's Man (2021)

== Mexican–American War (1846–1848) ==
- The Cemetery of the Eagles (1939)
- North and South (1985–1986), (TV miniseries)
- One Man's Hero (1999)
- Ravenous (1999)

== Revolutions of 1848 (1848–1849) ==
- 1848 (1949)
- The Sea Has Risen (1953)
- Flowers of Reverie (1984)

== Passive Resistance (Hungary) (1849–1867) ==
- The Round-Up (1966)
- Mathias Sandorf (1963)

== Taiping Rebellion (1850–1864) ==
- Noroshi wa Shanghai ni agaru (1944)
- The Warlords (2007)

== Crimean War (1853–1856) ==
- The Charge of the Light Brigade (1936)
- Admiral Nakhimov (1946)
- The Lady with a Lamp (1951)
- Charge of the Lancers (1954)
- The Charge of the Light Brigade (1968)

== Eureka Rebellion (1854) ==
- Eureka Stockade (1907)
- Eureka Stockade (1949)
- Eureka Stockade (1984), (TV miniseries)

== Indian Rebellion of 1857 and subsequent colonial conflicts in India (1857) ==
- Lives of a Bengal Lancer (1935)
- Wee Willie Winkie (1937)
- Gunga Din (1939)
- Anand Math (1952)
- King of the Khyber Rifles (1953)
- Bengal Brigade (1954)
- Jhansi Ki Rani (1953)
- The Brigand of Kandahar (1965)
- Shatranj Ke Khilari (1977)
- Junoon (1979)
- Kranti (1981)
- Swaraj (1998)
- Mangal Pandey: The Rising (2005)
- Victoria & Abdul (2017)

== American Civil War (1861–1865) ==
(Also see American Civil War films, Cinema and television about the American Civil War)

- The Birth of a Nation (1915)
- The Copperhead (1920)
- The General (1926)
- Abraham Lincoln (1930)
- The Littlest Rebel (1935)
- General Spanky (1936)
- Gone with the Wind (1939)
- Virginia City (1940)
- A Southern Yankee (1948)
- The Red Badge of Courage (1951)
- Friendly Persuasion (1956)
- Raintree County (1957)
- Band of Angels (1957)
- The Horse Soldiers (1959), depiction of Grierson's Raid
- How the West Was Won (1962) depiction of the Battle of Shiloh
- Major Dundee (1965)
- Shenandoah (1965)
- Alvarez Kelly (1966)
- The Good, the Bad and the Ugly (1966)
- A Time for Killing (1967)
- Rio Lobo (1970)
- The Beguiled (1971)
- The Outlaw Josey Wales (1976)
- The Blue and the Gray (1982), (TV miniseries)
- North and South (1985–1986), (TV miniseries)
- Lincoln (1988), (TV miniseries)
- Glory (1989)
- Dances with Wolves (1990)
- Ironclads (1991), (TV film)
- Gettysburg (1993)
- Class of '61 (1993), (TV film)
- Pharaoh's Army (1995)
- Andersonville (1996), (TV film)
- The Hunley (1999), (TV film)
- Ride with the Devil (1999)
- Gangs of New York (2002)
- Gods and Generals (2003)
- Wicked Spring (2003)
- Cold Mountain (2003)
- Abraham Lincoln: Vampire Hunter (2012)
- Lincoln (2012)
- Saving Lincoln (2013)
- Army of Frankensteins (2014)
- Field of Lost Shoes (2014)
- Free State of Jones (2016)
- Emancipation (2022)

== Franco-Mexican War (1861–1867) ==
(also see List of Second French intervention in Mexico films)

- Juarez (1939)
- The Eagle and the Hawk (1950)
- Stronghold (1951)
- Vera Cruz (1954)
- Major Dundee (1965)
- The Undefeated (1969)
- Two Mules for Sister Sara (1970)

== January Uprising (1863–1864) ==
- Szwadron (1992)

== Paraguayan War (1864–1870) ==
- Argentino hasta la muerte (1971)
- Cerro Cora (1978)

== Second Schleswig War (1864) ==
- Bismarck (1940)
- 1864 (2014), (TV series)

== Boshin War (1868–1869) ==
(also see List of Boshin War and Satsuma Rebellion films)

- When the Last Sword Is Drawn (2002)
- Shinsengumi! (2004), (TV series)

== Franco-Prussian War (1870–1871) ==
- Bismarck (1940)
- Mademoiselle Fifi (1944)
- A Day Will Come (1950)
- Die Gans von Sedan (1959)
- Field of Honor (1987)

== Herzegovina uprising (1875–77) ==
- Thundering Mountains (1963)

== Satsuma Rebellion (1877) ==
(also see List of Boshin War and Satsuma Rebellion films)

- The Last Samurai (2003)

== Russo-Turkish War (1877–1878) ==
- Admiral Nakhimov (1947)
- Heroes of Shipka (1955)
- The Turkish Gambit (2005)

== Scramble for Africa (1879–1914) ==
=== Anglo-Zulu War (1879) ===
- Zulu (1964)
- Zulu Dawn (1979)
- Shaka Zulu (1986)

=== Colonial conflicts in Northern Africa (1880s–1931) ===
- Beau Geste (1926)
- Beau Ideal (1931)
- Beau Geste (1939)
- Beau Geste (1966)
- The Wind and the Lion (1975)
- March or Die (1977)
- Lion of the Desert (1981)
- Legionnaire (1998)

=== Mahdist Sudanese War (1881–1899) ===
- The Four Feathers (1921)
- The Four Feathers (1929)
- The Four Feathers (1939)
- Storm Over the Nile (1955)
- Khartoum (1966)
- Young Winston (1972)
- The Four Feathers (1978)
- The Four Feathers (2002)

=== First Matabele War (1893–1894) ===
- Major Wilson's Last Stand (1899)
- Shangani Patrol (1970)

=== First Italo-Ethiopian War (1895–1896) ===
- Abuna Messias (1939)
- Adwa (1999)

=== Second Boer War (1899–1902) ===
- Cavalcade (1933)
- The Little Princess (1939)
- Ohm Kruger (1941)
- The Life and Death of Colonel Blimp (1943)
- Untamed (1955)
- Strangers at Sunrise (1969)
- Young Winston (1972)
- Breaker Morant (1980)
- Blood & Glory (2016)

=== Herero and Nama genocide (1904–1908) ===
- Measures of Men (2023)

=== Italo-Turkish War (1911-1912) ===
- Kif Tebbi (1928)

== Serbo-Bulgarian War (1885) ==
- Arms and the Man (1958)

== First Sino-Japanese War (1894–1895) ==
- Empress Myeongseong (2001)
- The Sword with No Name (2009)
- Saka no Ue no Kumo (2009)
- 1895 (2009)
- Deng Sichang: The Martyr (2012)

== Cuban War of Independence (1895–1898) ==
- Santiago (1956)

== Philippine Revolution (1896–1898) ==
- Last Stand in the Philippines (1945)
- El Filibusterismo (1962)
- José Rizal (1998)
- Bayaning Pilipino (2000)
- El Presidente (2012)
- Supremo (2012)
- Bonifacio: Ang Unang Pangulo (2014)
- A Lullaby to the Sorrowful Mystery (2016)
- 1898: Los últimos de Filipinas (2016)

== Spanish–American War (1898) ==
- I Loved a Woman (1933)
- The Bowery (1933)
- A Message to Garcia (1936)
- Texas Trail (1937)
- Yellow Jack (1938)
- Mother Carey's Chickens (1938)
- Teddy, the Rough Rider (1940)
- Citizen Kane (1941)
- Pursued (1947)
- Stars and Stripes Forever (1952)
- Posse (1993)
- The Rough Riders (1997)

== Boxer Rebellion (1899–1901) ==
- Foreign Devils (1928)
- The Mysterious Dr. Fu Manchu (1929)
- Alarm in Peking (1937)
- 55 Days at Peking (1963)
- Once Upon a Time in China IV (1993)
- The Boxer Rebellion (2009)

== Thousand Days' War (1899–1902) ==
- Encanto (2021)
- Adios al Amigo (2025)

== Philippine–American War (1899–1902/1913) ==
- The Real Glory (1939)
- Cavalry Command (1963)
- This Bloody Blundering Business (1975)
- Juramentado (1983)
- Sakay (1993)
- Amigo (2010)
- El Presidente (2012)
- Heneral Luna (2015)
- Goyo: Ang Batang Heneral (2018)

== Ilinden–Preobrazhenie Uprising (1903) ==
- To the Hilt (2014)

== Russo-Japanese War (1904–1905) ==
- The Battle (1934)
- Jack London (1943)
- Cruiser 'Varyag' (1946)
- Battle of the Japan Sea (1969)
- The Battle of Port Arthur (1980)
- Lime-iro Senkitan (2003)
- Saka no Ue no Kumo (2009)
- The Prisoner of Sakura (2019)

== Xinhai Revolution (1911–1912) ==
- The Battle for the Republic of China (1981)
- 1911 (2011)
- The Founding of a Party (2011)

== See also ==
- List of war films and TV specials
