= Takasugi Shinsaku =

Japanese samurai (1839–1867)

Senior Fourth Rank Takasugi Shinsaku
- 高杉 晋作
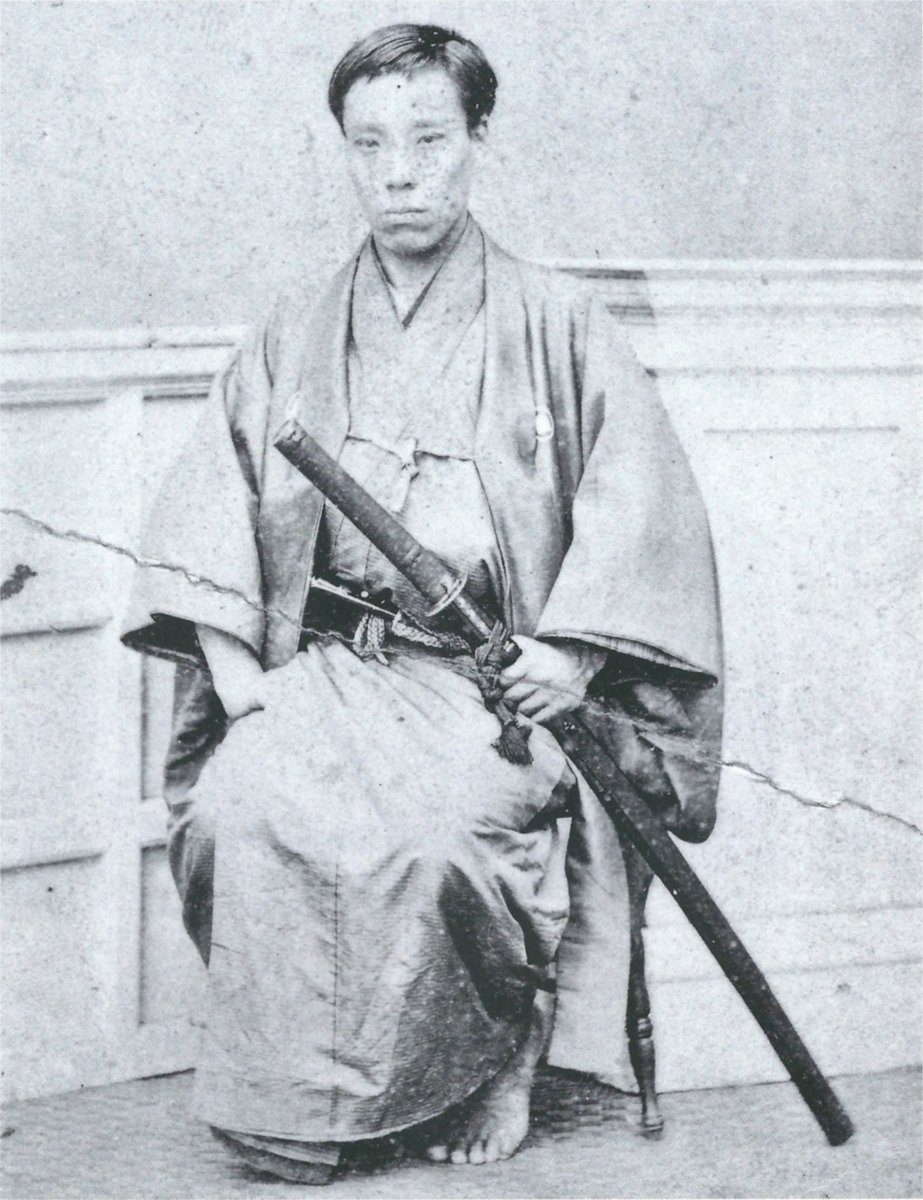
- Born: September 27, 1839; Hagi, Chōshū Domain, Japan
- Died: May 17, 1867 (aged 27); Shinchi-cho, Shimonoseki, Chōshū Domain, Japan
- Burial place: Tōgyō-an, Shimonoseki, Chōshū Domain, Japan
- Other names: Tani Senzo; Tani Umenosuke; Bingoya Sukeishiro; Mitani Wasuke; Hori Taro; Shishido Gyoma; Nishiura Matsusuke
- Spouse(s): Inoue Masa (m. 1860–1867) O-Uno (1863–1867)
- Children: Takasugi Toichi (son)
- Relatives: Takasugi Kochuta (father); Michi (mother); Takasugi Tomo (sister); Takasugi Sachi (sister); Takasugi Mei (sister)
- Military career
- Allegiance: Chōshū Domain
- Rank: Shoshi’i (正四位, Senior Fourth Rank)
- Nickname: Tōgyō
- Commands: Kiheitai
- Conflicts: Shimonoseki Campaign; First Chōshū expedition Kozan-ji uprising Second Chōshū expedition
- Memorials: Yasukuni Shrine; Tōgyō-an

Takasugi Shinsaku (高杉 晋作; 27 September 1839 – 17 May 1867) was a samurai from the Chōshū Domain of Japan who contributed significantly to the Meiji Restoration. He used several aliases to hide his activities from the Tokugawa shogunate.

== Early life ==
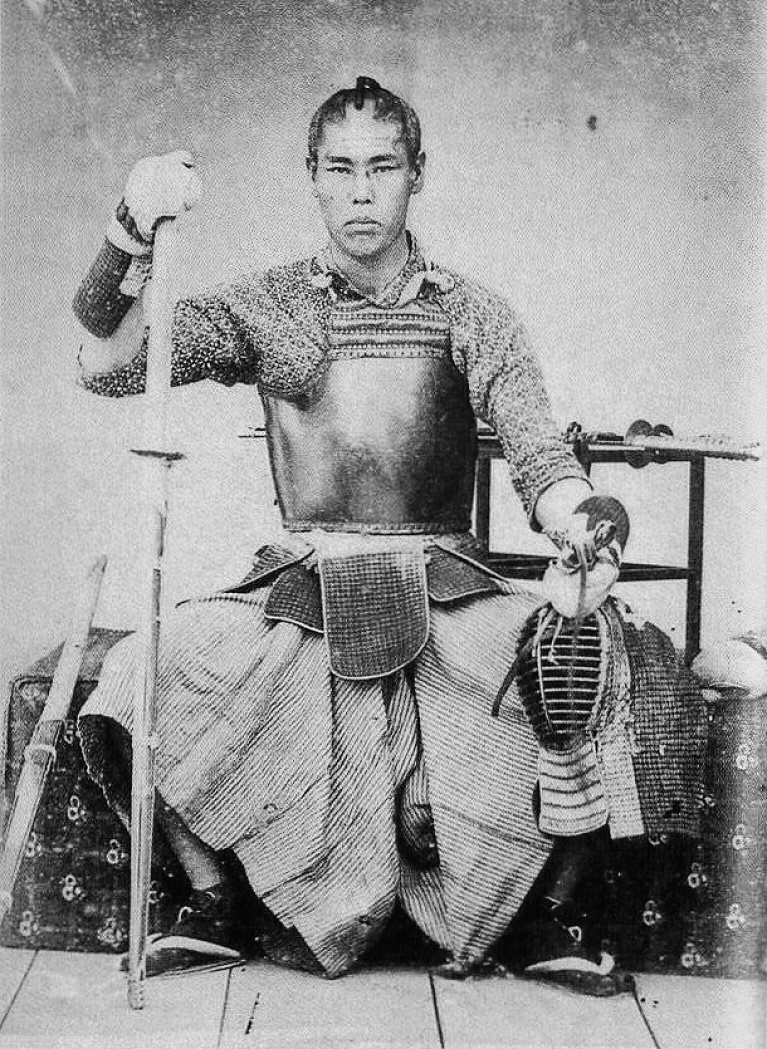
Takasugi Shinsaku in fencing training armor

Takasugi Shinsaku was born in the castle town Hagi, the capital of the Chōshū Domain (present-day Yamaguchi Prefecture) as the first son of Takasugi Kochūta, a middle-ranked samurai of the domain and his mother Michi (道). He had three younger sisters by the name of Tomo (智), Sachi (幸) and Mei (明). He had smallpox at the age of ten, but recovered from it.

Takasugi joined the Shōka Sonjuku, the famous private school of Yoshida Shōin. Takasugi devoted himself to the modernization of Chōshū's military, and became a favorite student of Yoshida. In 1858, he entered the Shōheikō (a military school under direct control of the shōgun at Edo). When his teacher was arrested during the Ansei Purge in 1859, Takasugi visited him in jail. Shōin was later executed on 21 November 1859. In December 1859 he returned home by the clan's command.

In January 1860, Takasugi married Inoue Masa (1845–1922), the second daughter of Yamaguchi retainer and magistrate Inoue Heiemon who was also the friend of his father. Masa was said to be the most beautiful lady in Suō and Nagato provinces. Their marriage was arranged by his parents, with hope that he would take his mind off of his teacher's death in 1859 and to settle down with his new bride.

However, in April 1861, Takasugi would leave his home and undertake naval training on the clan's warship Heishinmaru, and travelled to Edo. Later in September he went to study at the Tōhoku region, and there he was associated with Sakuma Shōzan and Yokoi Shōnan.

== Foreign experience ==
Takasugi, in spite of his young age, was an influential factor within Chōshū as one of the most extreme advocates of a policy of seclusion and expelling the foreigners from Japan.

In spite of Japan's policy of national isolation in the Edo period, in 1862 Takasugi was ordered by the domain to go secretly to Shanghai in Great Qing Empire to investigate the state of affairs and the strength of the Western powers. Takasugi's visit coincided with the Taiping Rebellion, and he was shocked by the effects of European imperialism even on the Chinese Empire. Takasugi returned to Japan convinced that Japan must strengthen itself to avoid being colonized by the western powers, or to suffer a similar fate as the Qing Empire. This coincided with the growing Sonnō Jōi ('expel the barbarians and revere the Emperor') movement, which attracted certain radical sections of Japan's warrior class and court nobility, and Takasugi's ideas found ready support in Chōshū and other parts of Japan. Takasugi was implicated in the 31 January 1863 attack on the British legation in Edo.

== Formation of the Shotai and Kiheitai ==
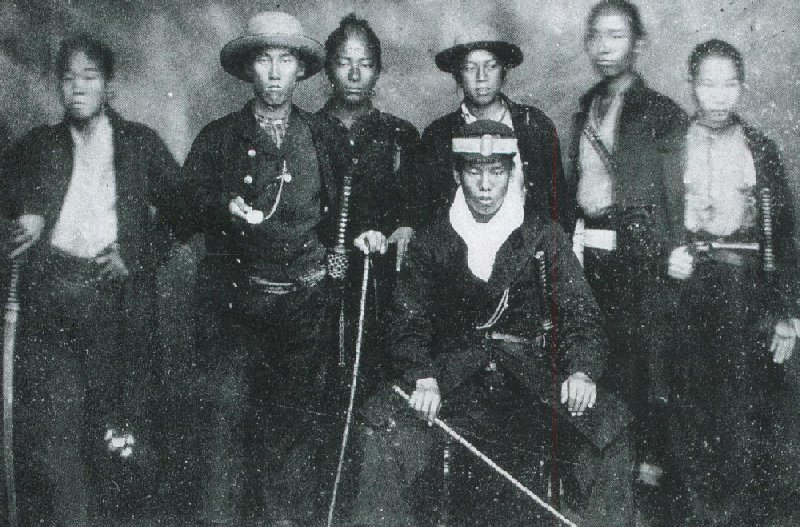
Takasugi Shinsaku founded the Chōshū Kiheitai, which fought against the Bakufu in the Second Chōshū expedition and the Boshin War.

Takasugi originated the revolutionary idea of auxiliary irregular militia (shotai). Under the feudal system, only the samurai class was allowed to own weapons. Takasugi promoted the recruitment of commoners into new, socially-mixed paramilitary units. In these units, neither recruitment nor promotion depended (at least in theory), on social status. Farmers, merchants, carpenters and even sumo-wrestlers and Buddhist priests were enlisted, although samurai still formed the majority in most of the Shotai. Takasugi clearly saw that utilization of the financial wealth of the middle-class merchants and farmers could increase the military strength of the domain, without weakening its finances. Since the leaders of Chōshū were unable - and unwilling - to change the social structure of the domain, limited use of peasants and commoners enabled them to form a new type of military without disturbing the traditional society.

In June 1863, Takasugi himself founded a special Shotai unit under his direct command called the Kiheitai, which consisted of 300 soldiers (about half of whom were samurai). Later on, while hiding away from assassins, he encountered a shamisen-playing geisha named O-Uno (1843–1909) at a brothel Sakai-ya in Akamaseki, Shimonoseki and went into a relationship with her.

== External and internal crisis ==
After Chōshū fired upon Western warships in the Straits of Shimonoseki on 25 June 1863, British, French, Dutch and American naval forces bombarded Shimonoseki, the main port of the Chōshū domain the following summer in what was later called the Bombardment of Shimonoseki. Takasugi was put in charge of the defense of Shimonoseki.

An anti-Chōshū coup in Kyoto on the 18 August 1863 threatened to jeopardize Chōshū's leading role in national politics, and Chōshū was ousted by a coalition of the Satsuma and Aizu in the imperial court.

Following the Kyohoji incident on 16 August which involved a conflict between the Chōshū's forces Kiheitai and Senkitai (撰鋒隊) at the Kyohoji temple which left two people dead, Hikosuke Miyagi, who was an inspecting officer of the Kiheitai, was forced to commit seppuku at the temple on 27 August. Although Takasugi narrowly escaped the seppuku, he was held liable for the incident and was dismissed as the leader of the Kiheitai, only about two months after its formation. The Kiheitai was taken over by Kawakami Yaichi and Taki Yataro, followed by Akane Taketo and Yamagata Aritomo in October.

In February 1864, Takasugi tried to dissuade Kijima Matabei from his plan to fight Satsuma and Aizu in Kyoto, but failed and then left the domain to hide in Kyoto himself. He was persuaded by Katsura Kogorō to return, but upon arrival he was put in Noyama-Goku Prison on the charge of leaving the domain. He was later released in July and ordered to confine himself at home.

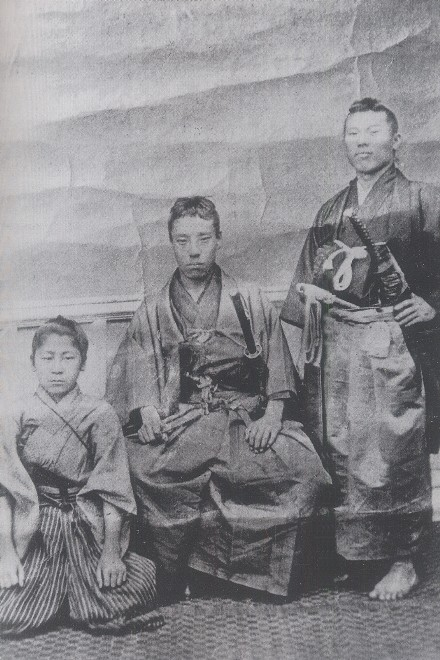
Kunimatsu Mitani (left), follower of Takasugi Shinsaku (center), and Itō Hirobumi (right)

In September 1864, a fleet of warships of British, French, Dutch and American naval forces attacked Shimonoseki again and occupied the gun battery there. This was followed by the landing of French marines. Their fighting against Chōshū units demonstrated the inferiority of traditional Japanese troops against a Western army, and convinced the leaders of the domain of the absolute necessity for a thorough military reform. Chōshū soon had no choice but to call on Takasugi again. Shinsaku was then forgiven and put in charge of peace negotiations. The Chōshū domain's administration called on Takasugi not only to carry out this reform as ‘Director of Military Affairs’, but he - only 25 years of age - was also entrusted with negotiating peace with the four Western powers.

In view of the humiliation of Chōshū forces against the Western powers, Takasugi had come to the realization that direct confrontation with the foreigners was not an option. Instead, Japan had to learn military tactics, techniques and technologies from the West. Takasugi reorganized his Kiheitai militia into a rifle-unit with the latest modern rifles, and introduced training in Western strategy and tactics. Moreover, Takasugi used his influence with the Sonnô Jôi-movement to promote a more a conciliatory policy towards the West and thus, the ‘movement to expel the barbarians and revere the Emperor’ evolved into an anti-Bakufu movement with the overthrow of the Tokugawa bakufu as a necessary means to strengthen Japan against the foreigners.

Weakened by the punitive attack by the Western powers, Chōshū was unable to withstand the expedition mounted by the Bakufu in autumn 1864 in retaliation for previous Chōshū attempts to seize control of Kyoto. At first, conservative forces, which favored conciliation with the Bakufu in order to secure the domain, were dominant in Chōshū politics, and Takasugi and some of his compatriots had to leave the domain to avoid renewed imprisonment. Takasugi, with only about a dozen followers, including future political leaders Yamagata Aritomo, Itō Hirobumi and Inoue Kaoru, gathered in Kokura in Kyūshū and prepared an attack on the conservative forces in Chōshū. The subsequent Chōshū civil war began on 13 January 1865.

Takasugi played a major role in this civil war and his former Kiheitai militia proved its superiority over old-fashioned samurai forces. With a series of quick strikes and the support of Katsura Kogorō, Takasugi achieved victory by March 1865. He became one of the main arbiters of the Chōshū domain's policy and continued to act as the domain's expert on Western military science, devoting his efforts to importing arms and raising troops. These reforms proved to be successful when Chōshū was victorious on four fronts against the Bakufu's Second Chōshū expedition on 7 June 1866, with the Kiheitai itself securing victory on two fronts. Takasugi's efforts had made a small-scale 'nation in arms' out of Chōshū, giving it a military strength out of proportion to its relatively small size. With its victory over the Tokugawa forces, the military power of the Bakufu was discredited, and traditionally rival domains decided to join forces with Chōshū in the subsequent battles which eventually led to the end of the Tokugawa bakufu and the start of the Meiji Restoration in 1868.

== Death ==
Takasugi did not live to see this success as his tuberculosis got worse in October 1866, after which he was moved to a residence of the bar manager Hayashi Sankuro. His mistress O-Uno and the Buddhist nun and poet Nomura Bōtō nursed him there.

Around February 1867, his wife Masa and their three year-old son Tōichi (aka Takasugi Umenoshin) (1864–1913) arrived from Hagi to visit him. Due to the presence of his wife and not wishing to sully Takasugi's name, O-Uno left and became a Buddhist nun under the name of Tani Baisho, but was later summoned back by Masa to look after him. However in March 1867, Takasugi's illness worsened yet again, Masa and Tōichi were summoned back to Hagi, while Baisho and Nomura stayed with him until his death on 17 May 1867.

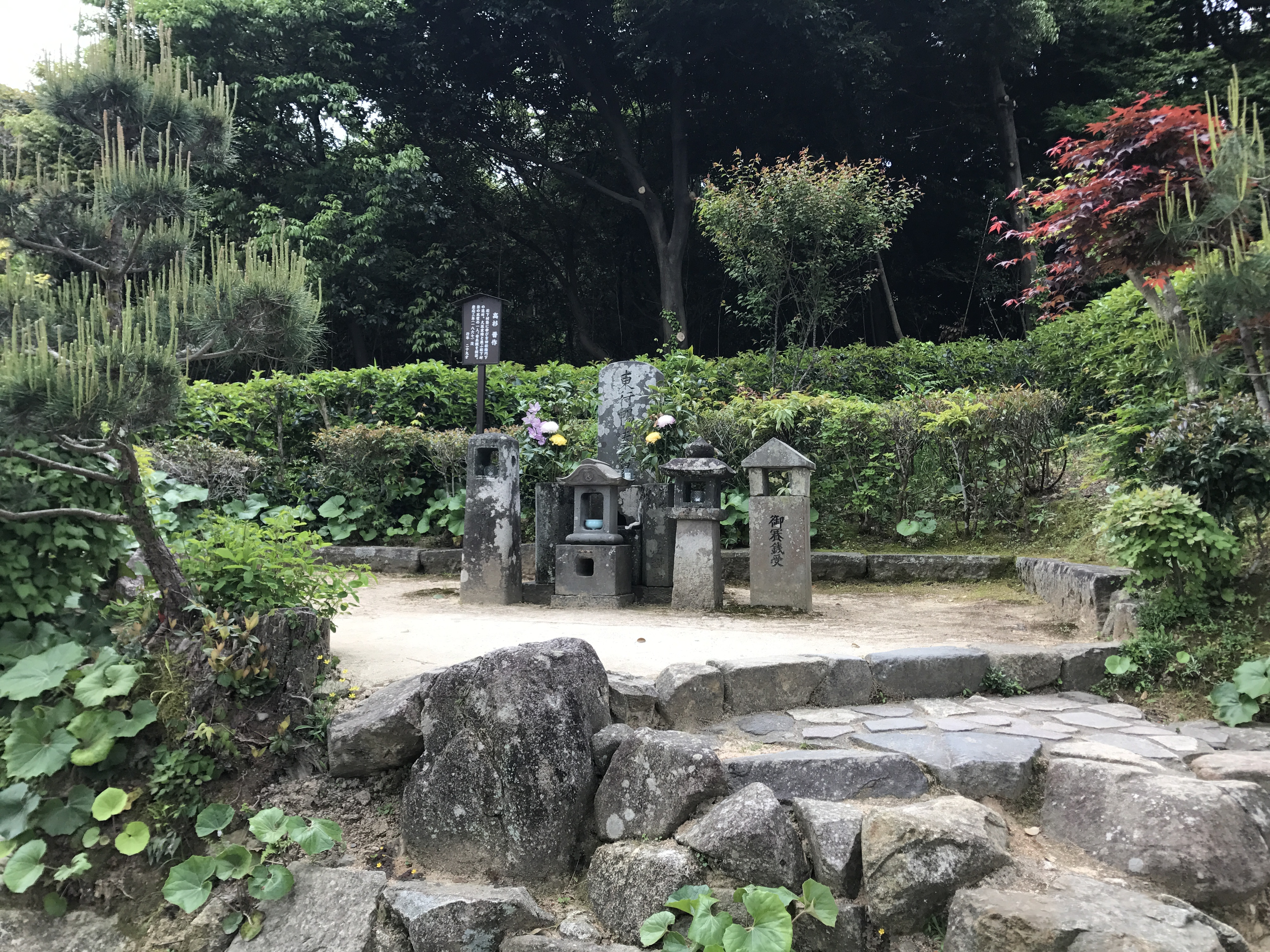
Tomb of Takasugi Shinsaku

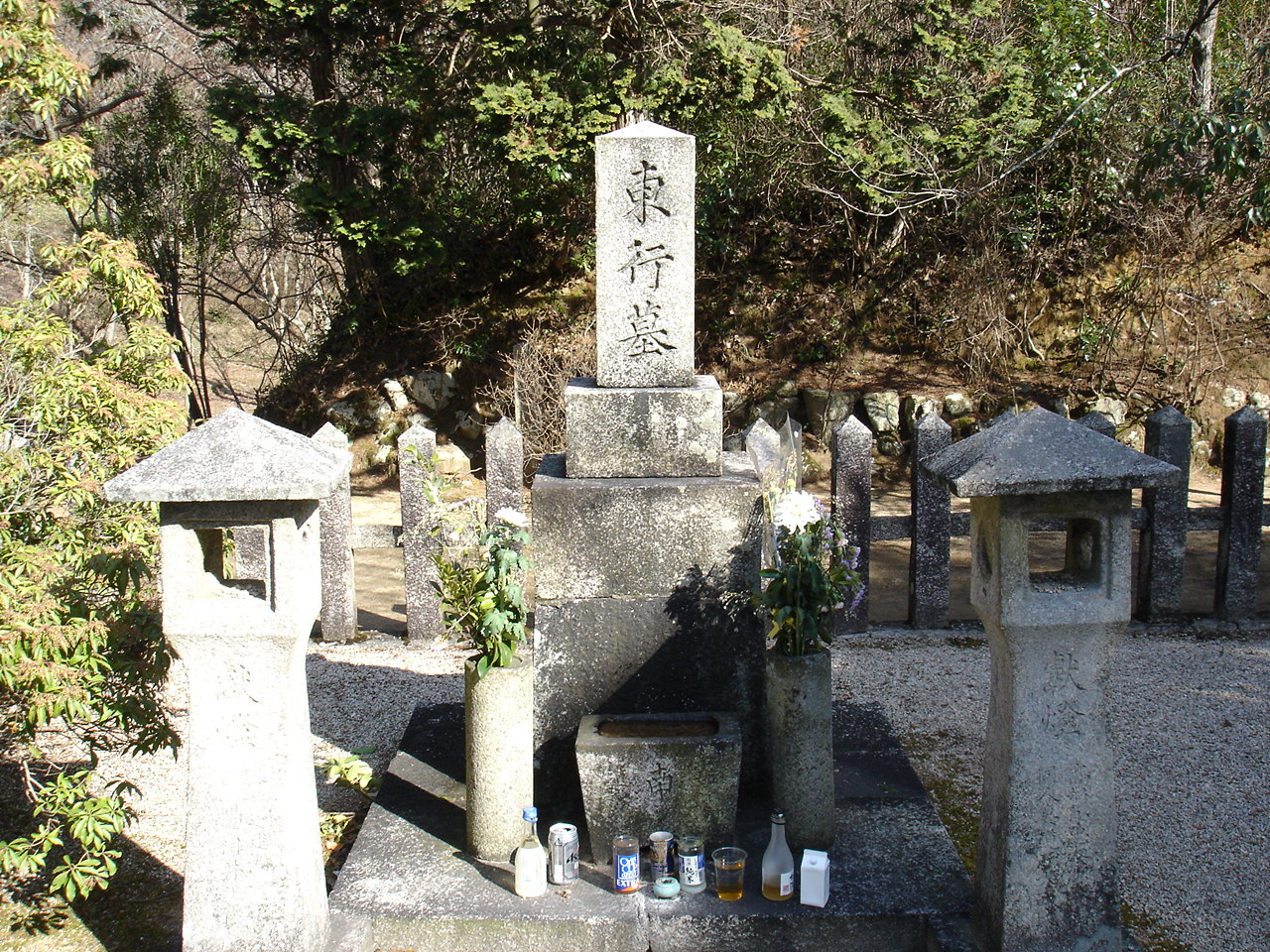
Close-up of the Tomb of Takasugi Shinsaku

Under his will, Takasugi was buried near the Kiheitai's camp at the Mt. Kiyomizu in Yoshida. Only a year later, Takasugi's dream of overthrowing the Tokugawa Shogunate, which found obvious manifestation in his nickname Tōgyō (東行), was fulfilled with the Meiji Restoration. Before leaving for Europe in 1869, Yamagata Aritomo presented his thatched hut named Murin-an (無鄰菴) which is also at Mt. Kiyomizu to Takasugi's former mistress and nun Baisho to dwell in and to look after his grave. Kido Takayoshi (formerly Katsura Kogorō) and his wife Matsuko would later take his young son Tōichi under their wings in 1871.

In 1884, Takasugi's friends and comrades, who included Yamagata Aritomo, Yamada Akiyoshi, Itō Hirobumi, and Inoue Kaoru among others, raised funds to have a hermitage Tōgyō-an (東行庵), named after Takasugi's nickname, built close to his gravesite, where Tani Baisho stayed and looked after his grave until her death in 1909. The grave itself was designated a National Historic Monument in 1934.

== Legacy ==
Takasugi Shinsaku, a central figure of the early Meiji Restoration, is as well known for his military talents as he is for his skills as a politician. However, dying at the young age of 28, Takasugi was not to become one of Japan's famous leaders in the subsequent Meiji era. Many of Takasugi's friends and followers would become members of the genrō, also known as the Meiji oligarchy, a group of senior statesmen that became the be ruling class of Japan.

In his hometown, the castle town Hagi, Yamaguchi in south-western Japan, he is still remembered as hero who put all his efforts into modernization, westernization and reforms in military, political and social matters.

== Court rank ==
- Shōshi'i (正四位, Senior Fourth Rank)

== Gallery of birthplace of Takasugi Shinsaku ==
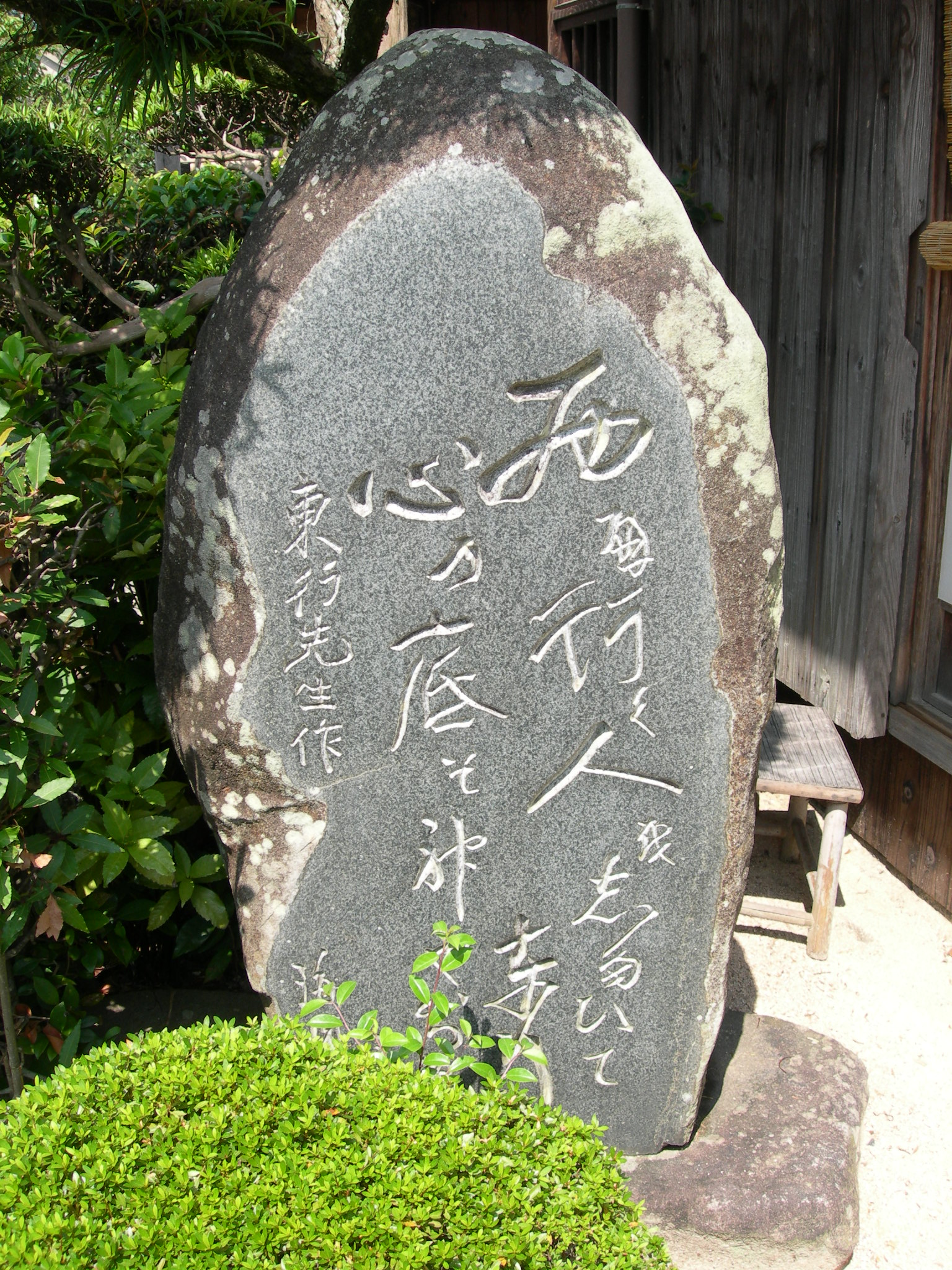

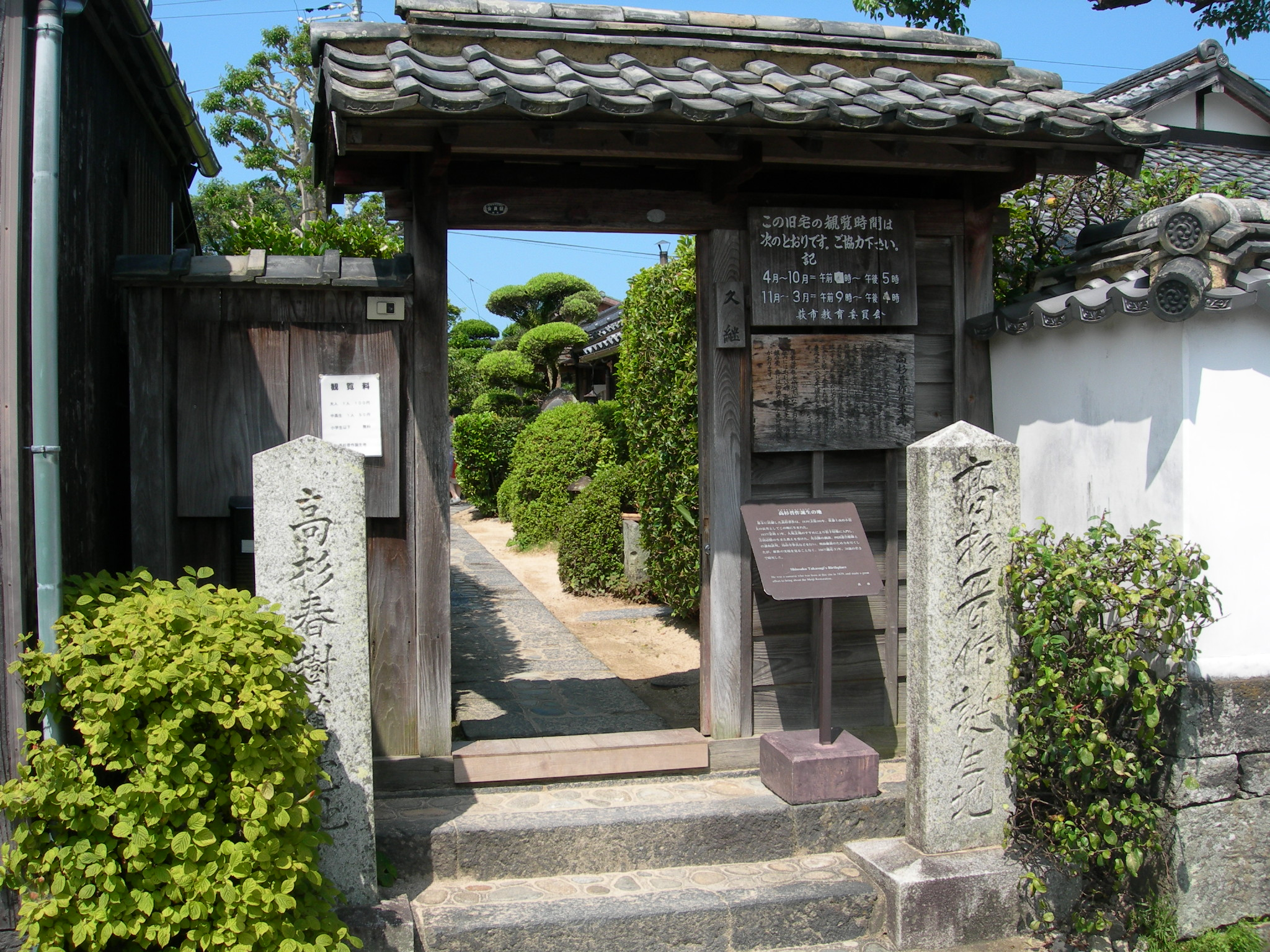
Gate of birthplace of Takasugi Shinsaku

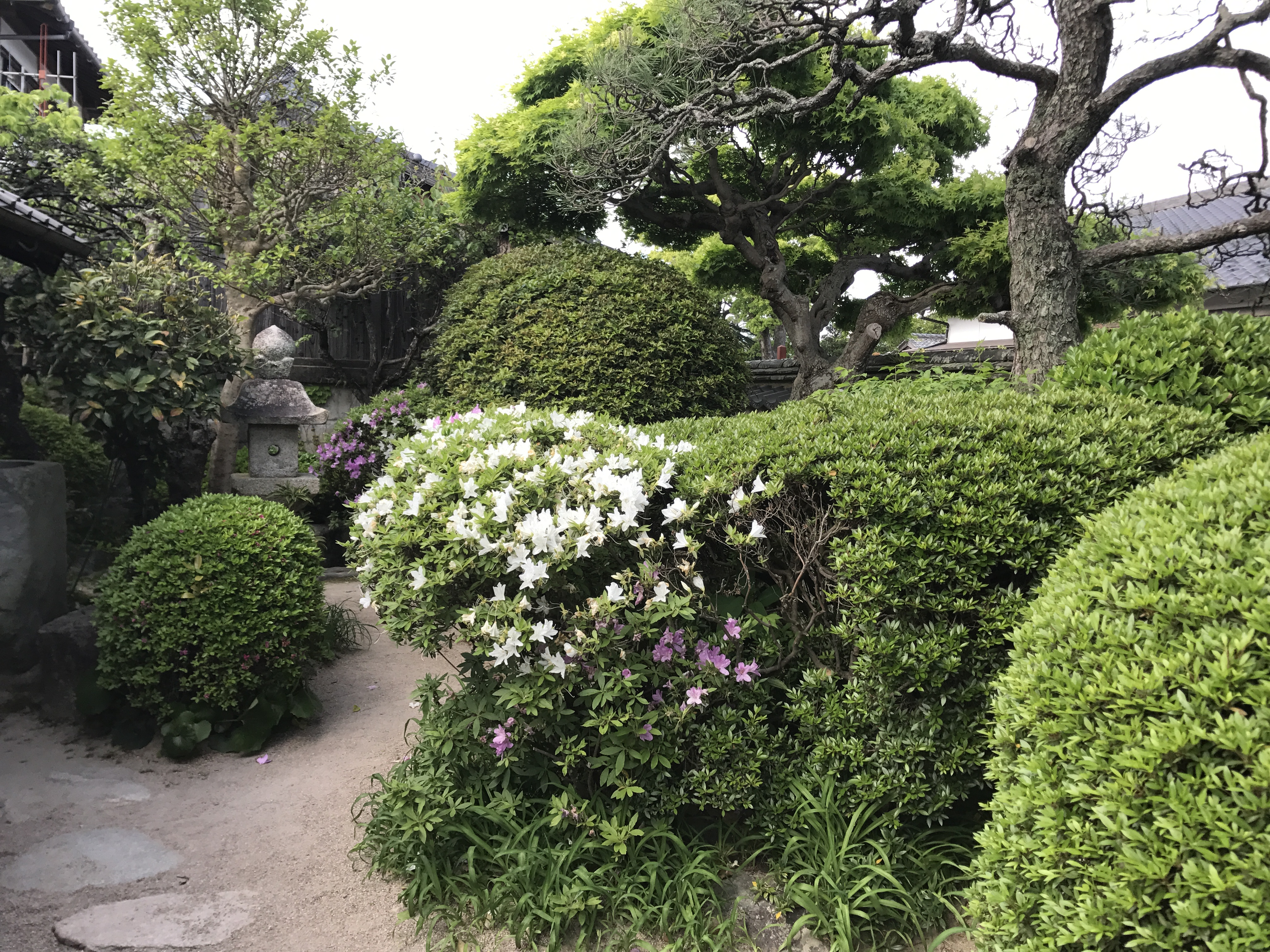
Garden of birthplace of Takasugi Shinsaku

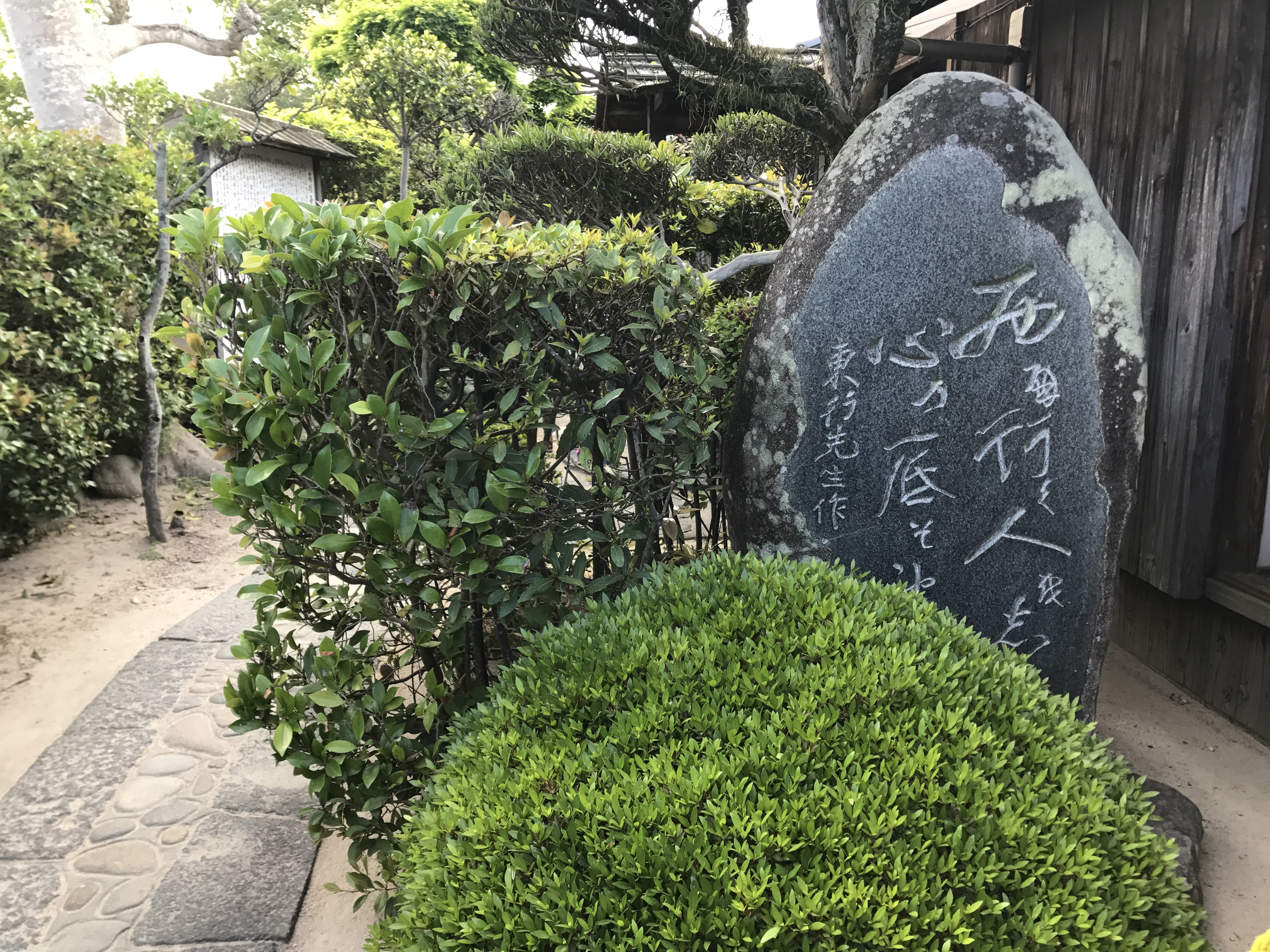
Stele in garden of birthplace of Takasugi Shinsaku

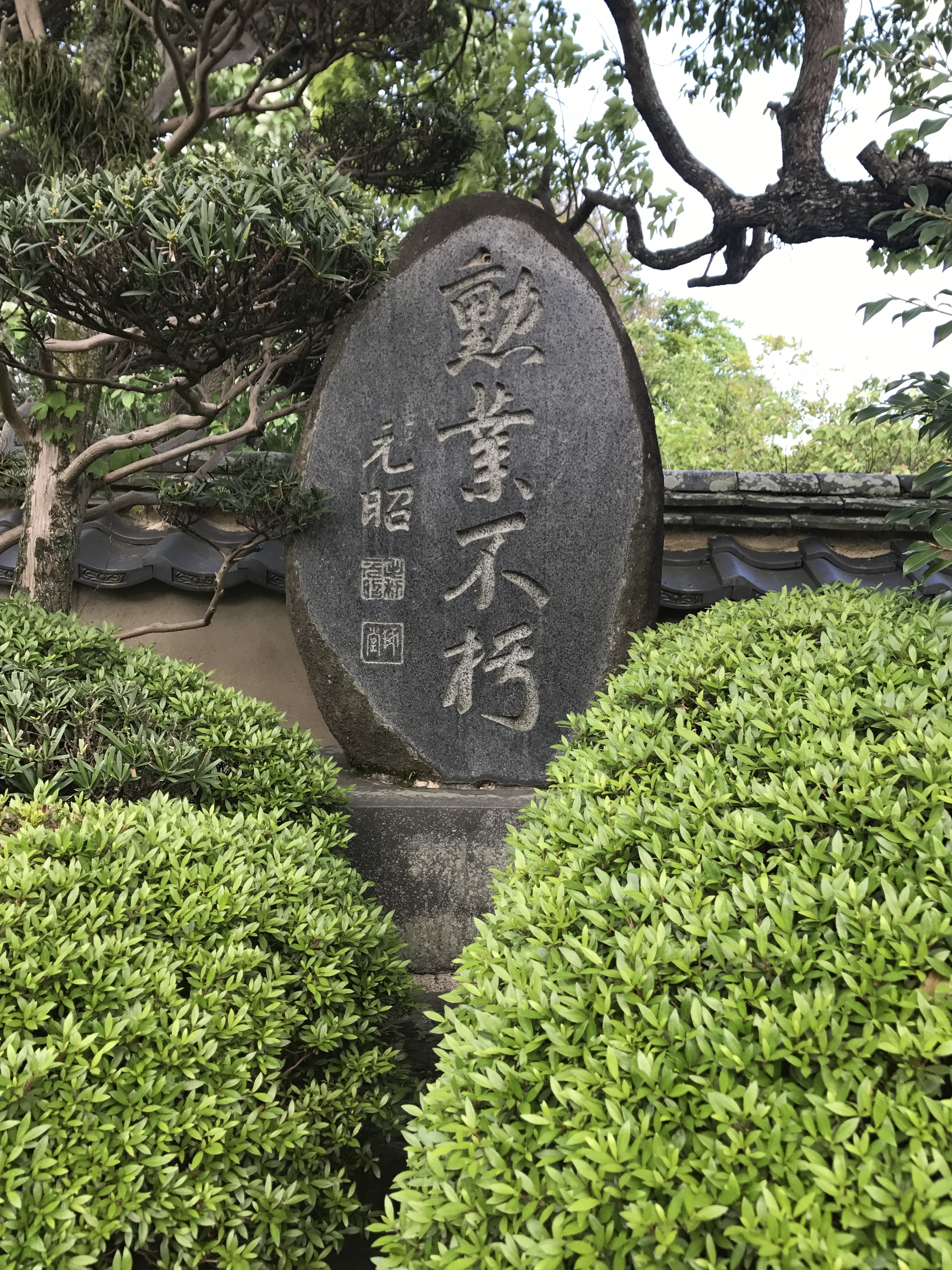

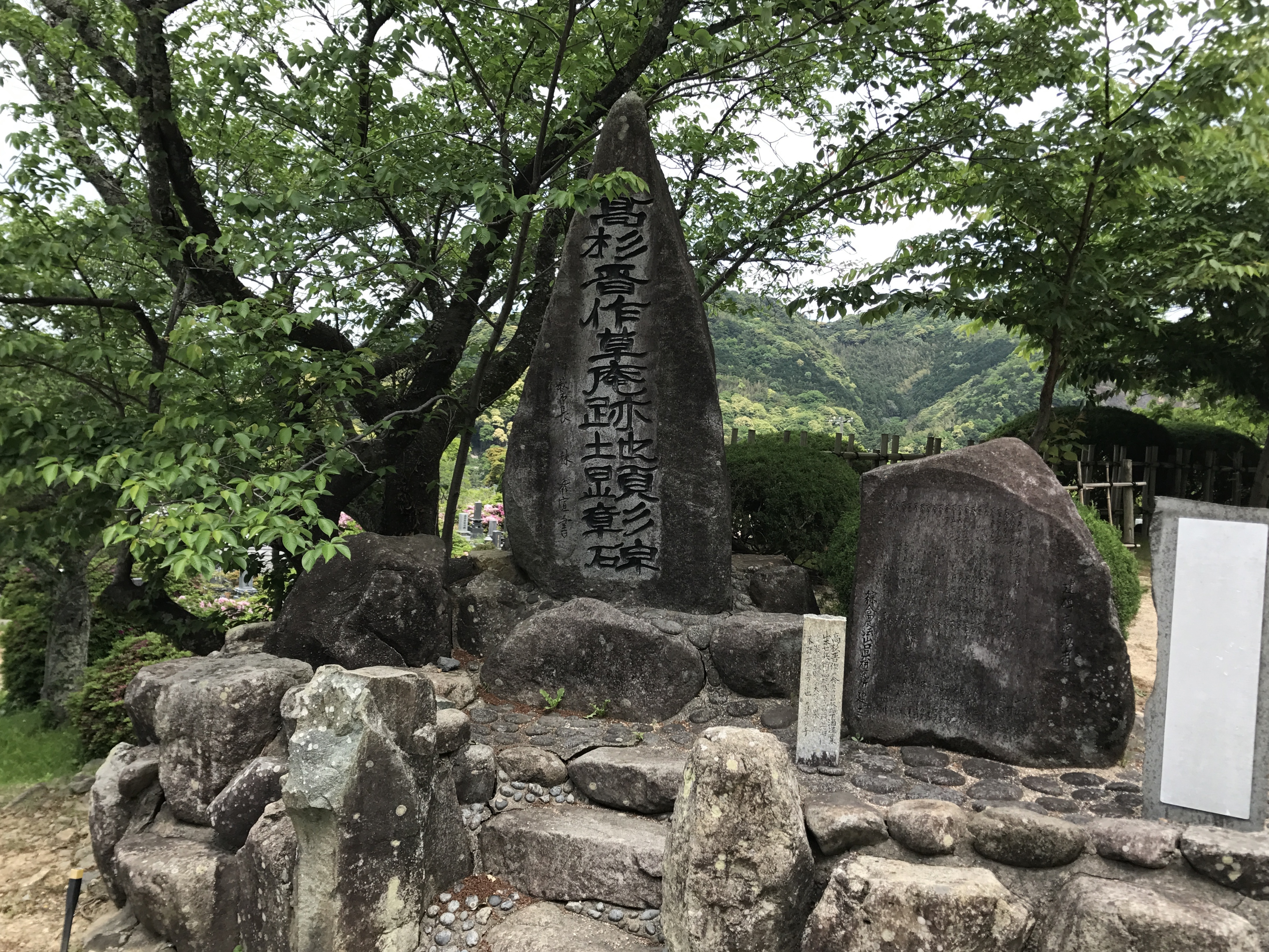
Stele on site of house of Takasugi Shinsaku

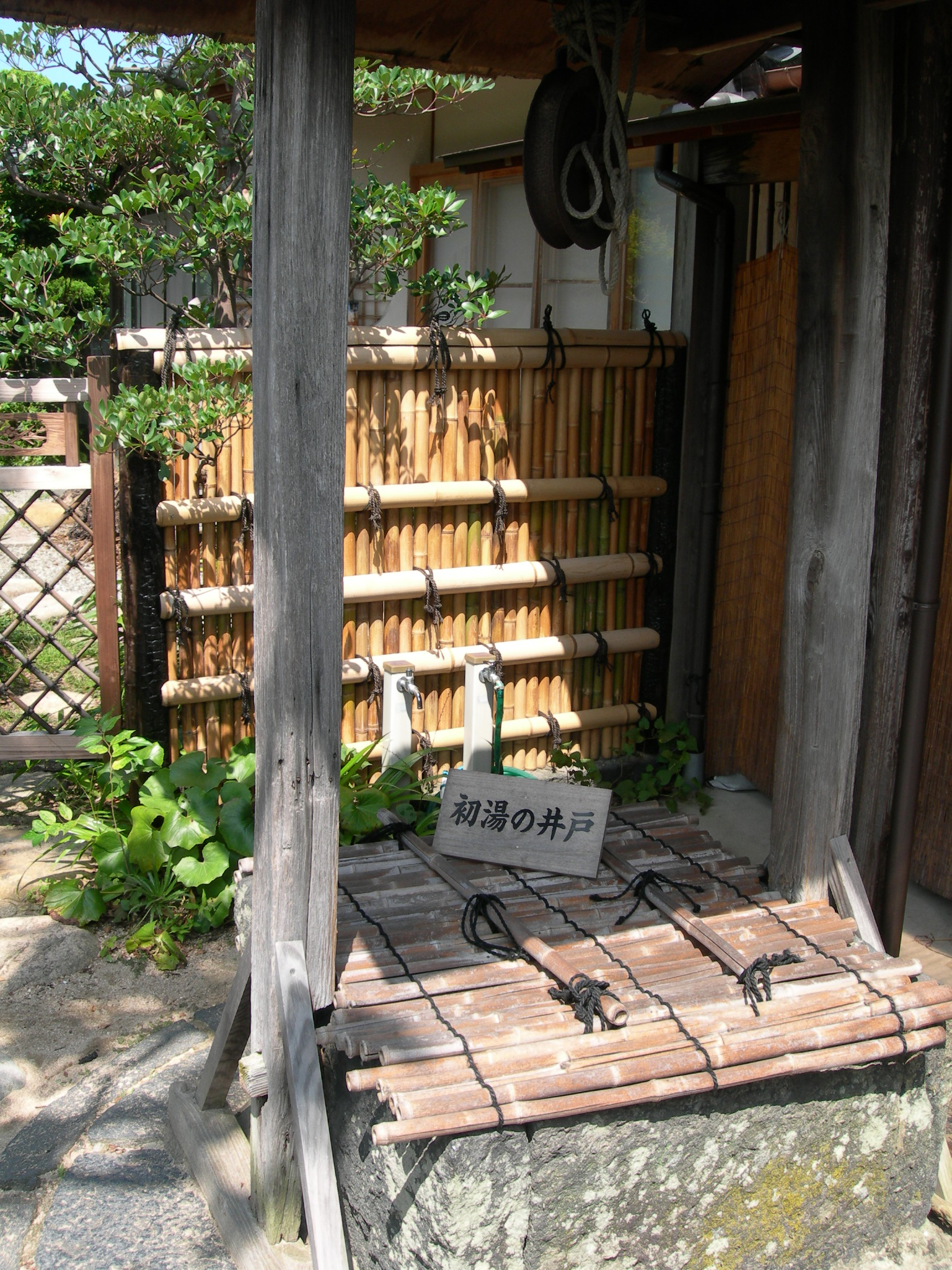

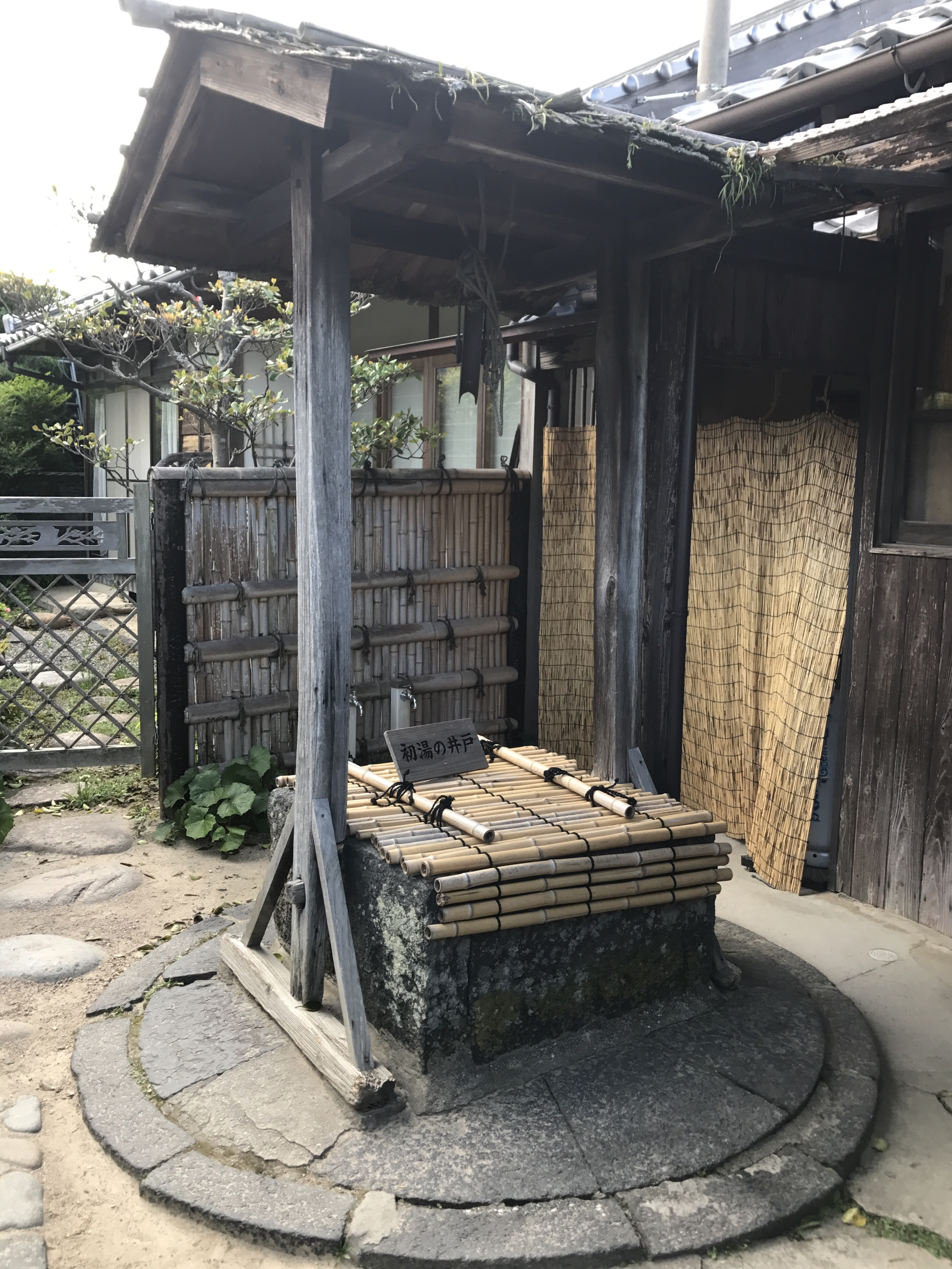
Well in garden of birthplace of Takasugi Shinsaku

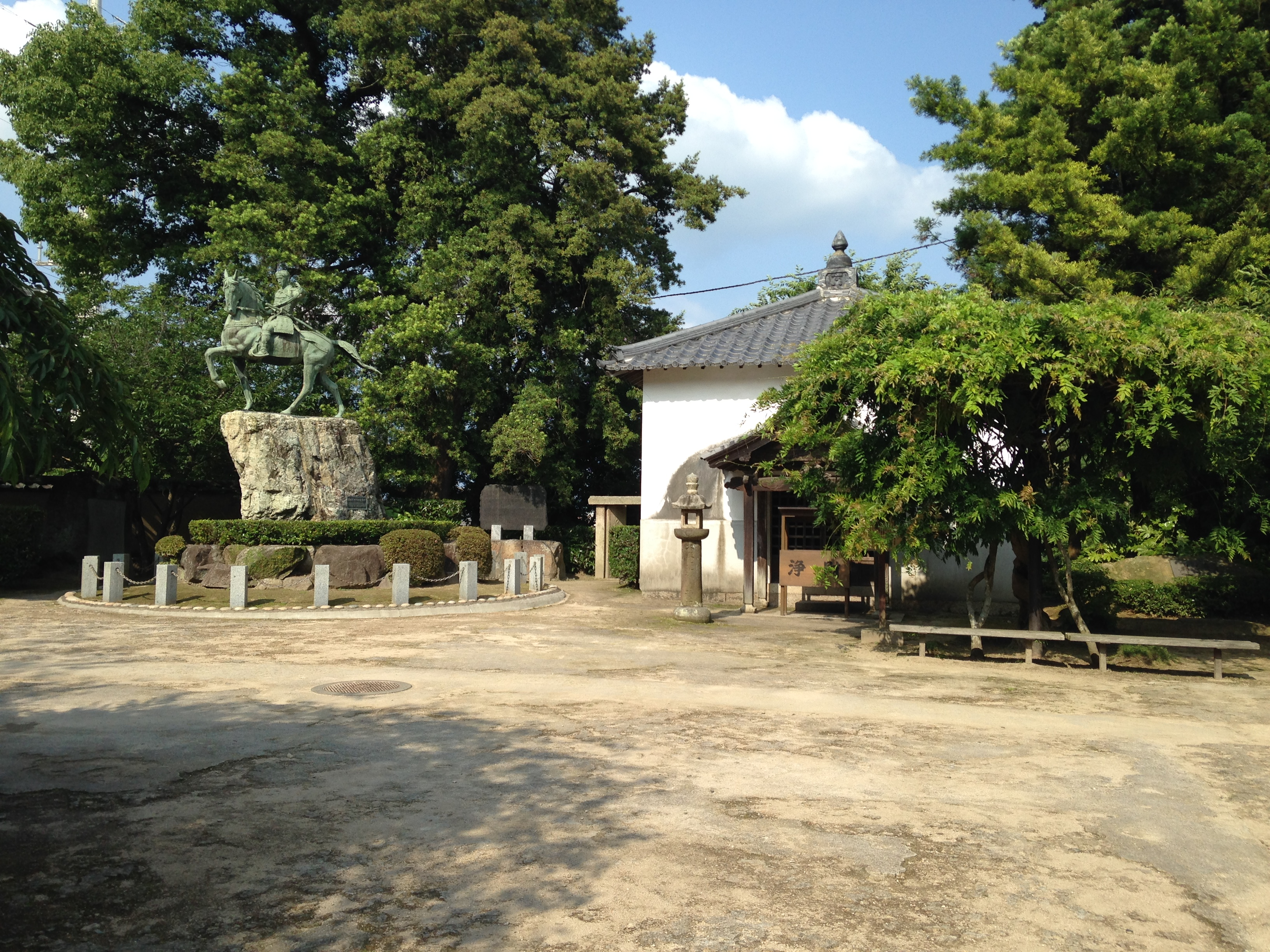
Sculpture of Takasugi Shinsaku's coup d'état and warehouse of sutras in Kozanji Temple

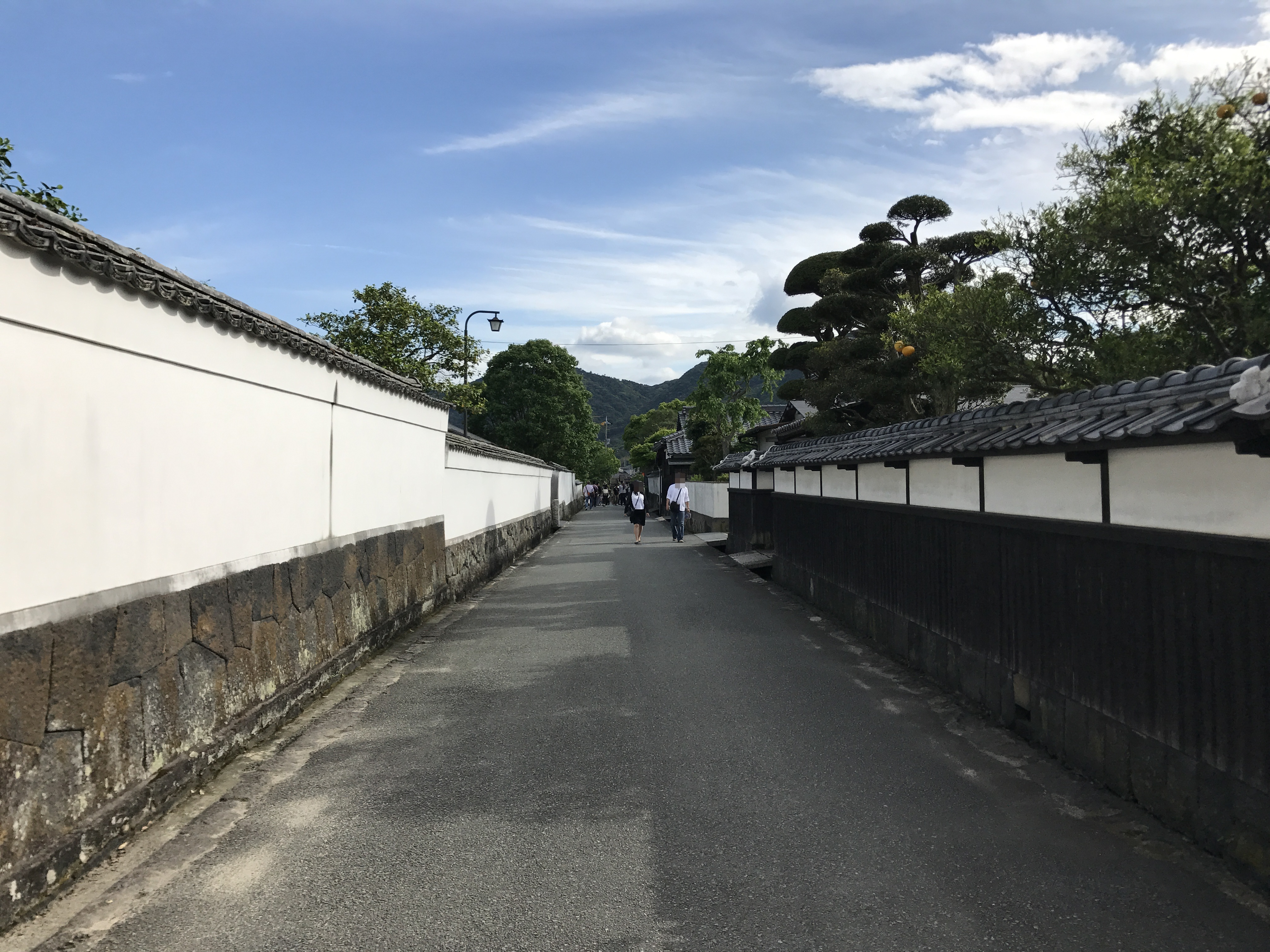
Kikuya Lane near birthplace of Takasugi Shinsaku

== In popular culture ==
- Takasugi is a secondary character present in the manga and anime Rurouni Kenshin, as well as its OAV adaptation Trust and Betrayal, shown to be in the last stages of his illness. He recruited the young Himura Kenshin into the Kiheitai before allowing Chōshū leader Katsura Kogorō to make him the Hitokiri Battōsai. While portrayed as a brash and ruthless warrior, he is nonetheless wary of his unsavory actions and tried to dissuade Katsura from "corrupting" Kenshin's soul, to no avail. His Japanese voice actor is Wataru Takagi, and his English voice actor is Jason Phelps.
- Takasugi was the inspiration for Shinsuke Takasugi, one of the main and earliest antagonists in the manga series Gin Tama.
- A highly fictionalized version of Takasugi appears in the PSP game Bakumatsu Rock and its anime adaptation. In the game, which is set in the Bakumatsu and has a musical theme, he is depicted as the bass player in a rock band led by Sakamoto Ryōma.
- Takasugi Shinsaku is usually portrayed in most NHK Taiga drama dealing with the Meiji Restoration. Most recent instances would be:
  - Ryōmaden, played by Japanese actor Yusuke Iseya
  - Hana Moyu, played by Japanese actor Kengo Kora.
- Takasugi Shinsaku was played by Japanese actor Yujiro Ishihara in the 1957 film Sun in the Last Days of the Shogunate.
- Takasugi Shinsaku is credited with the aphorism "Live a pleasant life in the unpleasant world" in the manga Natsuyuki Rendezvous.
- Takasugi Shinsaku is the protagonist in the anime "Bakumatsu". His Japanese voice actor is Yuuichi Nakamura.
- Takasugi Shinsaku appears as an Archer class Servant in the mobile game Fate/Grand Order.
- Takasuhi Shinsaku is a protagonist in the Manga Sidooh by Takashi Tsutomu.
- He is the starting general of the Choshu clan in the real time strategy game Shogun 2: Fall of the Samurai, also featuring the Kiheitai as the clan's unique elite unit.
- Takasugi Shinsaku is a playable character in the 2024 action RPG Rise of the Ronin.
- Takasugi Shinsaku is a supporting character in the 2026 action RPG Nioh 3.
