= Kiheitai =

- 奇兵隊
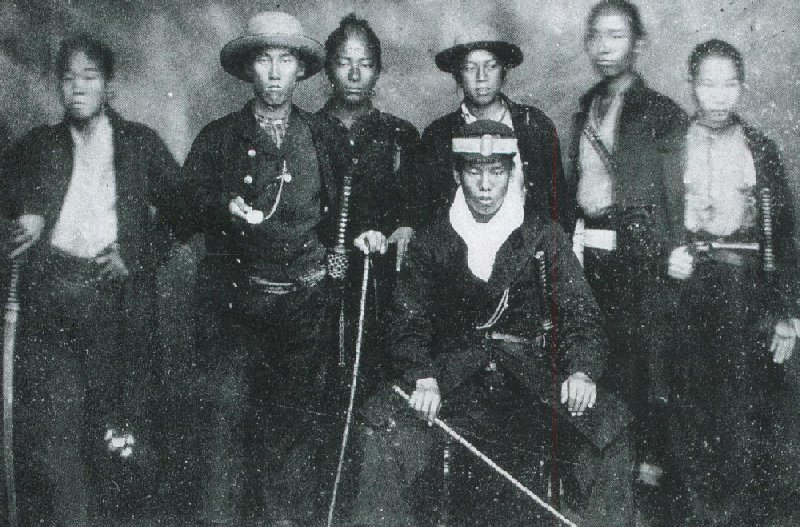
- Kiheitai Militia 1864-1866
- Active: 1863
- Disbanded: 1868
- Country: Japan
- Allegiance: Chōshū Domain
- Type: Volunteer Militia
- Size: 300 (Total enlisted: 622)
- Engagements: Shimonoseki Campaign; First Chōshū expedition Second Chōshū expedition Boshin War
- Takasugi Shinsaku (1863–1863)
- Yamagata Aritomo (1863–1868)

The Kiheitai (奇兵隊, Irregular Militia) was a volunteer militia raised by Takasugi Shinsaku of the Chōshū domain during the Bakumatsu period of Japan.

== Background ==
Formed in 1863 by Takasugi Shinsaku in Shimonoseki, Yamaguchi Prefecture, the Kiheitai militia consisted of 300 men, who came from all social classes, including farmers, merchants, samurai and others. Most were from Chōshū, but a few volunteers were from other domains. The Kiheitai was known for its discipline, and use of western-style weapons and military techniques. It was partly funded by the Chōshū domain, but gained the rest of its financial support through donations by wealthy merchants and farmers. Kiheitai followed a developing trend which had been spearheaded by the shogunate following the Convention of Kanagawa to form military units based on ability rather than hereditary social status. Shinsengumi, a Kyoto-based, pro-Tokugawa police force, was founded in the same year as Kiheitai, and was also composed of people from a broad variety of social classes.

== Battles ==
The Kiheitai militia saw action in the Bombardment of Shimonoseki in June 1863, during which the fleets of Great Britain, France, the Netherlands, and the United States fired upon the Chōshū port city of Shimonoseki, and subsequently landed troops.

On 16 August 1863, the Kyohoji incident, which involved the conflict between the Kiheitai and another Chōshū unit Senkitai (撰鋒隊) forces at the Kyohoji temple, leaving two people dead. The Kiheitai's inspecting officer Hikosuke Miyagi was forced to commit seppuku at the temple while Takasugi himself was held liable and was dismissed as the leader of the Kiheitai on 27 August, only about two months after its formation. The Kiheitai was taken over by Kawakami Yaichi and Taki Yataro as its second leaders. In October the Kiheitai was taken over again by Akane Taketo as the third leader with Yamagata Aritomo as the commander.

In February 1865, a Second Kiheitai was formed in the Suō Province with Kosuke Shirai as its first leader with Shūzō Sera as the commander.

As the military arm of the pro-reform faction within the Chōshū domain, the Kiheitai helped overthrow the pro-bakufu faction in the Chōshū civil war, repulsed the Second Chōshū expedition sent by the Tokugawa bakufu on 7 June 1866.

Takasugi died of tuberculosis on 17 May 1867. The Kiheitai militia played an important role in the Boshin War, which led to the Meiji Restoration.

== Disband ==
The Kiheitai was disbanded in 1868, with total enlistment of 622 men since 1863. The success of the socially mixed unit and its Western armaments and tactics was an important influence on the development of the Imperial Japanese Army, and on the later system of universal military conscription in Japan.

== Other Usage ==
The forces defending Aizu-Wakamatsu during the Boshin War in 1868, and the forces of Saigō Takamori in the Satsuma rebellion in 1877 also used the term Kiheitai to describe themselves.

== In popular culture ==
- The Kiheitai appeared in an expansion of Creative Assembly's Total War: Shogun 2, Fall of the Samurai as special units of the Choshu domain. They are featured as an elite unit, having below-par statistics with other late game elite infantry but requiring less money and time to recruit and maintain, and can be recruited on unlimited number unlike other elite units.
- In Rurouni Kenshin the Kiheitai is seen in a number of flashbacks as the title character, Kenshin, was recruited into the force by Takasugi Shinsaku himself.
- In Gintama the Kiheitai also appears as a terrorist faction led by Gintoki's old friend turned enemy, Shinsuke Takasugi, who is loosely based on Takasugi Shinsaku.
