= Peter Davis (British director) =

British-Canadian Documentary Filmmaker

- Peter Davis in 1971
- Born: November 12, 1933; London, England
- Died: December 1, 2025 (aged 92); Vancouver, Canada
- Other name: Autolycus Davis
- Education: Oxford University
- Occupation: Documentary Filmmaker
- Years active: 1959-2019
- Notable work: Chelsea Bridge Boys, This Bloody Blundering Business, Generations of Resistance, In Darkest Hollywood: Cinema and Apartheid, The Legacy of Jon Gates
- Partner: Joy Searl Davis

Peter Davis (November 12, 1933 – December 1, 2025) was a British-Canadian independent film director and producer whose documentaries were primarily focused on human rights issues, the environment and apartheid in South Africa.

== Early life ==
Peter Davis grew up in Bethnal Green, London. During The Blitz, his family moved to Wallington, in the London suburbs. He attended Oxford University on scholarship. Davis had always been interested in the film industry, but Oxford did not offer cinema studies classes. He took courses in English instead, hoping to work as a scriptwriter, and had JRR Tolkien and CS Lewis as English professors.

== Career ==
After university, Davis lacked the connections to enter the industry. He found work as an English Teacher instead, at his former grammar school. While there, he made a film with his students, Shadowplay, about a class that murders their teacher. The film received some acclaim in amateur film circles, and Davis was able to find work as an apprentice assistant editor at Merton Park Studios.

Davis moved to Sweden in the early 1960s, and was hired as a filmmaker for Swedish Television. This led him to work in non-fiction, though he had originally planned to work as a scriptwriter. He filmed, directed and produced documentaries on a variety of subjects, primarily Latin America and aspects of his hometown East London, including the first documentary on the rocker subculture. He met Staffan Lamm during this period, who he would continue to work with for much of his early career. He also became fluent in Swedish.

After working for Swedish Television, Davis moved to New York State in 1969. That year, he went on a trip to around twenty African countries, working for CARE International as a cameraman. This sparked his interest in Africa. Davis founded Villon Films in 1970, and made dozens of films over the next fifty years. Villon Films is independent, and Davis often filmed, directed, produced, edited and distributed his films by himself.

Many of Davis' best known works are about South Africa. These include White Laager (1977), Generations Of Resistance (1980), Winnie Mandela: Under Apartheid (1985), South Africa: The Nuclear File (1985), Nelson Mandela: Prisoner To President (1988) and In Darkest Hollywood: Cinema and Apartheid (1995. Davis' first film in South Africa, Hello from Swaziland, was made for PBS and about the Afrikaner gambling culture in Swaziland. Davis' name was not published in the credits, as he knew he would want to return to South Africa to make more films that would further critique apartheid, and it was likely that the government would not allow him to enter.

Davis returned to South Africa to film White Laager, a history of Afrikaner nationalism. While filming it, Davis was imprisoned overnight and expelled from South Africa by the police. He finished the film with British archival footage. For his next film, Generations of Resistance, which was about Black resistance to apartheid, Davis was not permitted to enter South Africa. He started recording footage in Zambia and Tanzania instead, but managed to catch a flight into Lesotho, surrounded by South Africa. From there, he could access South Africa through the independent province of Transkei, therefore avoiding border crossings into South Africa. Once in South Africa he documented Nelson Mandela's upbringing and interviewed some of his family. He also interviewed Winnie Mandela. This footage went into the films Winnie Mandela: Under Apartheid, and later, a sequel about Nelson Mandela, Nelson Mandela: Prisoner To President or Remember Mandela, which premiered at the 1988 Democratic National Convention.

After apartheid ended, Davis was allowed to legally enter South Africa again, and this is when he made the two part series In Darkest Hollywood, which focused on the role of cinema in apartheid. It, and his accompanying book, were described in American Anthropologist as Davis' "crowning work". Davis' films are some of the only outside documentation of apartheid, and have been described in reviews as amongst the best material on the subject.

In the 1990s, Davis and his co-director Harvey McKinnon became interested in making a film about the AIDS crisis. They started working on a film about activist Jon Gates, who was from British Columbia, where Davis and McKinnon were living at the time. They documented his trip to Zimbabwe to work with anti-AIDS groups there. However, soon after the trip, Gates died of AIDS. Davis and McKinnon decided to pivot subjects, and ended up making the film Side By Side, Women Against AIDS about the women running those grassroots groups in Zimbabwe. They received funding to show the film to millions of Zimbabweans. Afterwards, they finished their film The Legacy of Jon Gates, released in 1994. Davis made a third film in 1996, Sangoma: Traditional Healers in Modern Society, about Zulu healers' place in the modern South African health care system, especially in the context of AIDS.

Anti-war movements also were also the subject of Davis' documentaries. He was present at the Dialectics of Liberation conference and created a documentary about it for WNET, Anatomy Of Violence, shortly afterwards. Another of his films, Where's George, is about an American Soldier that defected from the American military during the Vietnam War. Davis filmed the footage for the documentary in 1969, but did not release it until 2005. He also made a documentary, This Bloody, Blundering Business, about the American occupation of the Philippines.

Davis (left) directing the Nature of David Suzuki

Davis made multiple films about environmental issues. His 1998 film, Black Sea, Voyage of Healing, is about the impacts of pollution and cultural practices on the Black Sea. He has also directed a documentary, The Nature of David Suzuki, that focuses on Suzuki's childhood in internment camps and personal life.

Davis has also worked to amplify other filmmakers' work, distributing primarily South African filmmakers' work through Villon Films. He has also unearthed and restored many historic films that are now available in Villon Films' archive. This collection includes African Jim and Siliva the Zulu; the subject of one of Davis' books and the first film made in Sub-Saharan Africa with an all Black cast. Davis has described this archival work as fulfilling his desire to work on African stories, without requiring the same amount of funding - he refers to the search for funding as a "soul-destroying process" for him as an independent filmmaker.

Davis has worked as a director-cameraman for the BBC, CBC Television, Danish TV, The Australian Broadcasting Corporation, and WNET, as well as a producer for London’s Rediffusion Television, BBC, CBS, CBC, CTV Television Network, Polytel, WNET, the United Nations, UNICEF, and CARE International

== Personal life ==
Davis was married to Joy Searl Davis, who recorded the audio for many of his films. They have two daughters. He lived in upstate New York for much of his career, and moved to Vancouver in the 1990s where he lived until his death in 2025.

Davis described himself as "a man of the Left" and was "deeply sorry about the decline of the Left [in the UK]."

== Films ==
Year	Title	Credits	Description	Produced for	Ref(s)				
Year	Title	Credits	Description	Produced for	Ref(s)	1959	Shadowplay	Director, producer, writer, cameraman	About a schoolboy that murders his teacher
1961	El Masna	Director	Portrait of young weavers in an Egyptian village	Swedish Television					
1962	Pub	Director	Scenes from a pub near Davis' childhood home	Swedish Television					
1963	Belize - End of the World	Director	Overview of Belize on the edge of independence	Swedish Television					
1964	Jamaica	Director	Overview of Jamaica	Swedish Television					
1964	Cuba, Cult and Culture	Director	Overview of Cuban culture and Fidel Castro	Swedish Television					
1964	Fidel, Film, Freedom	Director	Archive compilation about Cuba	Swedish Television					
1964	Chelsea Bridge Boys	Co-director with Staffan Lamm	About the Rockers in London	Swedish Television					
1964	Immigrants	Co-director with Staffan Lamm	About immigrant communities in London	Swedish Television					
1964	Public School	Co-director with Staffan Lamm	Portrait of a British public school	Swedish Television					
1964	Royal Hospital	Co-director with Staffan Lamm	Interviews with residents in a veteran's hospital	Swedish Television					
1967	El Reto	Editor and audio recorder	About the presidential election in the Dominican Republic	US Agency for International Development					
1967	Strip	Co-director with Staffan Lamm and Don Defina	Portrait of a London strip club	Swedish Television					
1967	Children of the Long-Beaked Bird	Producer	Portrait of a Crow Native American family	Swedish Television					
1967	Dialectics Of Liberation - Anatomy Of Violence	Director, producer	Report on the Dialectics of Liberation conference	WNET					
1969	Chicago 68 - Jerry Rubin At Rutgers	Co-director with Staffan Lamm	Speech by Jerry Rubin						
1969	Chicago 68 - Riots	Co-director with Staffan Lamm	Anti-war rallies during the 1968 Democratic National Convention						
1969	D.H. Lawrence In Taos	Director, producer	Portrait of DH Lawrence and his New Mexico residence						
1969	Sight & Sound	Director	Series of 5 films on foreign language teaching	Northeast Conference of Language Teachers					
1970s	Henninger	Director	Portrait of German artist Manfred Henninger	Villon Films					
1970s	The Dixie Mission	Director	About the officers that participated in the Dixie Mission	CBC					
1970	Making Of Hi, Mom! With Brian De Palma	Director	About the making of the movie Hi, Mom!						
1971	This Bloody, Blundering Business	Director	Satirical documentary about the American occupation of the Philippines	Villon Films, CBC					
1971	The Knapp Commission	Director	Inquiry into corruption in New York City’s police force	CBC					
1973	Counterpoint: The U-2 Story	Co-director with Staffan Lamm	About the 1960 U-2 incident	Villon Films, Polytel International					
1973	The Real-Life Story of 'State of Siege'	Director	Behind the scenes of the film State of Siege	CBC					
1974	The Paperback Vigilante	Director	Biography of E Howard Hunt	Villon Films, Swedish Television					
1974	Weavers of Lesotho	Director	Portrait of weavers in Lesotho	CARE International					

=== Other Works ===
- Hello from Swaziland! (director, 1975)
- The Panovs (director for CBC, 1975)
- Malombo (director, 1977)
- White Laager (director, 1977)
- Generations Of Resistance (director, 1980)
- George Seldes 90th Birthday Party (director/producer, 1981)
- Nigeria - Life, Culture, And Industry (audio, directed by Robert Elfstrom, 1982)
- Rise & Fall Of The Borscht Belt (director/producer, 1982)
- South Africa: The Nuclear File (director/producer, 1985)
- A Sizwe Bansi Workshop (director, 1985)
- On Fighting Witches (directed by Robert Shaye, cinematography by Peter Davis, 1985)
- Winnie Mandela: Under Apartheid (director, 1985)
- Nelson Mandela: Prisoner To President or Remember Mandela (director, 1988)
- South Africa: Under the Gun (co-producer, 1988)
- In Darkest Hollywood: Cinema and Apartheid (Part 1 & 2) (produced, written, filmed and edited with Daniel Riesenfeld, 1993)
- Side By Side: Women Against AIDS In Zimbabwe (director, 1993)
- The Legacy Of Jon Gates (written, directed and produced with Harvey McKinnon, 1993)
- Sangoma: Traditional Healers in Modern Society (director, 1996)
- Black Sea Voyage Of Healing (director, 1998)
- The Nature Of David Suzuki (director, 1998)
- Travels with Dolly (Part 1 & 2) (director, 1998)
- Danube Blues (director/producer, 2003)
- Where’s George? (director, 2005)
- Behind The Lens - Robert Elfstrom Remembers Johnny Cash (director/producer, 2013)
- Hoagy (director, 2013)
- Digging “The Spanish Earth” (director/producer, 2017)

== Books ==
- In Darkest Hollywood: Exploring the Jungles of Cinema's South Africa (1996)
- Come Back Africa – Lionel Rogosin, A Man Possessed (editor, 2004)
- On Location, Zululand - The Making Of Siliva the Zulu (2012)
