= List of Boshin War and Satsuma Rebellion films =

Below is an incomplete list of feature films, television films or television series which include events of the Boshin War and Satsuma Rebellion. This list does not include documentaries, short films.

== 1920s ==
Year	Country	Main title (Alternative title)	Original title (Original script)	Director	Subject
1926	Empire of Japan	A sunny day and a cloudy day	照る日くもる日	Buntarō Futagawa; Hôzô Nakajima; Yoshinosuke Hitomi	Drama. Based on the novel A sunny day and a cloudy day.
1926	Empire of Japan	A sunny day and a cloudy day	照る日くもる日	Teinosuke Kinugasa	Drama. Based on the novel A sunny day and a cloudy day.
1927	Empire of Japan	A sunny day and a cloudy day	照る日くもる日	Jukô Takahashi	Drama. Based on the novel A sunny day and a cloudy day.

== 1930s ==
Year	Country	Main title (Alternative title)	Original title (Original script)	Director	Subject
1930	Empire of Japan	All-out attack on Edo Castle	江戸城総攻め	Seika Shiba	Drama. Based on the kabuki theater play All-out attack on Edo Castle.
1933	Empire of Japan	First battle	初陣	Taizô Fuyushima	About the Byakkotai
1937	Empire of Japan	Shinsengumi	新選組	Sotoji Kimura	Drama.

== 1940s ==
Year	Country	Main title (Alternative title)	Original title (Original script)	Director	Subject
1940	Empire of Japan	A sunny day and a cloudy day	照る日くもる日	Kumahiko Nishina	Drama. Based on the novel A sunny day and a cloudy day.
1941	Empire of Japan	Last day of Edo	江戸最後の日	Hiroshi Inagaki	Historical drama. Based on the play Last day of Edo.
1942	Empire of Japan	Ōmura Masujirō	大村益次郎	Kazuo Mori	Biography. Based on a novel about Ōmura Masujirō
1944	Empire of Japan	Army	陸軍	Keisuke Kinoshita	War movie. Based on the novel Army.

== 1950s ==
Year	Country	Main title (Alternative title)	Original title (Original script)	Director	Subject
1952	Japan	Shinsengumi Part 1 Kyo Raku Fuun no Maki, Part 2 Ikedaya Riot, Part 3 Magical Sword Ranbu	新撰組 第一部京洛風雲の巻、第二部池田屋騒動、第三部魔剣乱舞	Ryo Hagiwara	
1954	Japan	The Last of Samurai	新選組鬼隊長	Toshikazu Kôno	Historical drama. Based on the novel Woman of fire. About Kondō Isami and the Shinsengumi.
1954	Japan	A sunny day and a cloudy day	照る日くもる日	Toshio Shimura	Drama. Based on the novel A sunny day and a cloudy day.
1954	Japan	The Great White Tiger Platoon	花の白虎隊	Katsuhiko Tasaka	War movie. About the Byakkotai and Aizu Domain
1958	Japan	The Birth of Tokyo	大東京誕生 大江戸の鐘	Tatsuo Ôsone	Action.

== 1960s ==
Year	Country	Main title (Alternative title)	Original title (Original script)	Director	Subject
1960	Japan	Bright and Cloudy Days	照る日くもる日	Kôkichi Uchide	Drama. Based on the novel A sunny day and a cloudy day.
1961	Japan	Fuun Shinsengumi	風雲新撰組	Masaki Môri	Drama. About the Shinsengumi.
1963	Japan	Shinsengumi Chronicles	新選組始末記	Kenji Misumi	Drama. Based the novel The Shinsengumi Disposal.
1963	Japan	Bloody Record of the Shinsengumi	新選組血風録 近藤勇	Shigehiro Ozawa	Based on the novel Shinsengumi Keppūroku.
1969	Japan	Shinsengumi	新撰組	Tadashi Sawashima	Period drama. About the Shinsengumi.
1969	Japan	Red Lion	赤毛	Kihachi Okamoto	Action-comedy. About the Sekihōtai.

== 1970s ==
Year	Country	Main title (Alternative title)	Original title (Original script)	Director	Subject
1974	Japan	The Last Swordsman	沖田総司	Masanobu Deme	Period drama. About Okita Sōji an the Shinsengumi.
1975	Japan	Roar	吶喊	Kihachi Okamoto	Action-comedy.

== 1980s ==
Year	Country	Main title (Alternative title)	Original title (Original script)	Director	Subject
1980	Japan	Collapse of the Tokugawa clan	徳川一族の崩壊	Kōsaku Yamashita	Period drama. About the Aizu Domain during the Tokugawa shogunate.
1981	Japan	Why Not?	ええじゃないか	Shōhei Imamura	Drama. About the Ee ja nai ka and the Social reform uprising.
1985	Japan	The Dagger of Kamui	カムイの剣	Rintaro	Animated action-adventure. Based on The Dagger of Kamui series of novels.
1986	Japan	Bakumatsu Youth Graffiti Ronin Ryoma Sakamoto	幕末青春グラフィティ Ronin 坂本竜馬	Yoshitaka Kawai	Romantic action drama.
1986	Japan	Jazz Daimyo (Dixieland Daimyo)	ジャズ大名	Kihachi Okamoto	Musical comedy drama. Based on the novel Jazz Daimyo.
1988	Japan	Goryokaku	五稜郭	Kōsei Saitō	

== 1990s ==
Year	Country	Main title (Alternative title)	Original title (Original script)	Director	Subject
1991	Japan	The Passage to Japan	福沢諭吉	Shinichiro Sawai	Drama. About Fukuzawa Yukichi.
1999	Japan; France; United Kingdom	Taboo	御法度	Nagisa Ōshima	Historical thriller. Based on the novel Shinsengumi Keppūroku.

== 2000s ==
Year	Country	Main title (Alternative title)	Original title (Original script)	Director	Subject
2000	Japan	Shinsengumi	新選組	Kon Ichikawa	Action anime. Based on the manga Shinsengumi.
2002	Japan	The Twilight Samurai	たそがれ清兵衛	Yoji Yamada	Romantic drama. Based on the short story The Bamboo Sword.
2002	Japan	When the Last Sword Is Drawn	壬生義士伝	Yōjirō Takita	Period drama. Based on the Mibu Gishi Biography of Kanichiro Yoshimura.
2004	Japan	Toshizo Hijikata White Trail	土方歳三 白の軌跡	Chie Uratani	About Hijikata Toshizō and the Shinsengumi.
2004	Japan	The Hidden Blade	隠し剣 鬼の爪	Yoji Yamada	Period drama. Based the Hidden sword short stories.
2006	Japan	True Story Shinsengumi	実録 新選組	Hiroyuki Tsuji	Action. About the Shinsengumi.
2007	Canada; France; Italy; United Kingdom; Japan; United States	Silk		François Girard	Drama. Based on the novel Silk.

== 2010s ==
Year	Country	Main title (Alternative title)	Original title (Original script)	Director	Subject
2012	Japan	Rurouni Kenshin	るろうに剣心	Keishi Ōtomo	Period drama. Based on the manga Rurouni Kenshin.
2014	Japan	Bakumatsu high school student	幕末高校生	Toshio Lee	Action. Based on the short story Remaining Snow.
2015	Japan	Joint funeral (Gassoh)	合葬	Tatsuo Kobayashi	Drama. Based on the manga Joint funeral.

== 2020s ==
Year	Country	Main title (Alternative title)	Original title (Original script)	Director	Subject
2020	Japan	The Pass: Last Days of the Samurai	峠 最後のサムライ	Takashi Koizumi	Period drama. Based on the novel Mountain pass about Kawai Tsugunosuke.
2021	Japan	Rurouni Kenshin: The Beginning	るろうに剣心 最終章	Keishi Ōtomo	Period drama. Based on the manga Rurouni Kenshin.
2021	Japan	Baragaki: Unbroken Samurai	燃えよ剣	Masato Harada	Period drama. Based on the novel Moeyo Ken. About Hijikata Toshizō and the Shinsengumi.
2024	Japan	11 Rebels	十一人の賊軍	Kazuya Shiraishi	Period drama. About the Shibata clan

== Science fiction, fantasy, and horror films ==
Year	Country	Main title (Alternative title)	Original title (Original script)	Director	Subject
2019	Japan	Labyrinth of Cinema	海辺の映画館―キネマの玉手箱	Nobuhiko Obayashi	Anti-war fantasy drama.

== Television films ==
Year	Country	Main title (Alternative title)	Original title (Original script)	Director	Subject
1961	Japan	Fuun Shinsengumi/Isamu Kondo	風雲新選組・近藤勇	Masaki Mouri	Drama.
1978	Japan	Let the clouds fly	雲を翔びこせ	Shin'ichi Kamoshita	Shibusawa Eiichi.
1985	Japan	Atsuhime Tenshoin	天璋院篤姫	Kazuo Yamauchi	Based on the novel Atsuhime Tenshoin about Tenshō-in.
2002	Japan	Mibu Gishiden ~The strongest man in the Shinsengumi~	壬生義士伝〜新選組でいちばん強かった男〜	Shingo Matsubara; Keiji Nagao	Period drama. Based on the Mibu Gishi Biography of Kanichiro Yoshimura.
2003	Japan	Did the master quit again? ~ Oguri Koenosuke, a famous magistrate at the end of the Edo period ~	またも辞めたか亭主殿〜幕末の名奉行・小栗上野介〜	Yoshiyuki Yoshimura	Based on the novel Did the master quit again? ~ Oguri Koenosuke, a famous magistrate at the end of the Edo period about Oguri Kozukenosuke.
2006	Japan	Shinsengumi!! Toshizo Hijikata's last day	新選組!! 土方歳三 最期の一日	Kunio Yoshikawa	Period drama. About Hijikata Toshizō and the Shinsengumi.
2007	Japan	Byakkotai	白虎隊	Hajime Hashimoto	Period drama. About the Byakkotai.
2013	Japan	Byakkotai ~Those who will not be defeated	白虎隊〜敗れざる者たち	Toshihiko Shigemitsu	Drama. About Saigō Tanomo, the Aizu Domain and the Byakkotai.

== Television series ==
Year	Country	Main title (Alternative title)	Original title (Original script)	Director	Subject
1961	Japan	Kamigata Bushido	上方武士道		
1961	Japan	The Shinsengumi Disposal	新選組始末記		Based on The Shinsengumi Disposal.
1965	Japan	Shinsengumi Keppuroku	新選組血風録	Yasushi Sasaki; Toshikazu Kôno; Ikuo Takami	Based on Shinsengumi Keppūroku.
1965	Japan	Burning White Tiger Corps	燃ゆる白虎隊	Nobuo Nakagawa; Kiyoshi Saeki	About the Byakkotai.
1966	Japan	Burn the sword	燃えよ剣		Based on Moeyo Ken.
1967	Japan	Three sisters	三姉妹		
1969	Japan	Kamigata Bushido	上方武士道	Katsuhiko Tasaka	
1970	Japan	Kokushi -Namika Yukyoden-	俄－浪華遊侠伝－	Toshimasa Suzuki; Yasuo Inoshita	Based on Naniwa Yuukiden.
1970	Japan	Burn the sword	燃えよ剣		Based on Moeyo Ken. About Hijikata Toshizō and the Shinsengumi.
1973	Japan	Shinsengumi	新選組		
1974	Japan	Katsu Kaishū	勝海舟		Drama. Based on the novel Katsu Kaishū about Katsu Kaishū.
1977	Japan	The Shinsengumi Disposal	新選組始末記		Based on The Shinsengumi Disposal.
1977	Japan	Bakumatsu futuristic person	幕末未来人		Based on the short story Remaining Snow.
1977	Japan	Flower god	花神		Period drama. Based on the novels Flower god, Days of living in the world, The eleventh patriot, Pass, Drunk as a Lord. About Ōmura Masujirō, Takasugi Shinsaku, Inaba Masami and the Shōkasonjuku Academy.
1980	Japan	Age of lions	獅子の時代		Period drama.
1986	Japan	Byakkotai	白虎隊	Buichi Saitō	Period drama.
1988	Japan	Goryokaku	五稜郭	Kōsei Saitō	Enomoto Takeaki.
1989	Japan	Kiheitai	奇兵隊	Buichi Saitō	Period drama.
1990	Japan	Burn the sword	燃えよ剣		Based on Moeyo Ken.
1990	Japan	Kaishu Katsu	勝海舟		Katsu Kaishū
1994	Japan	Bakumatsu high school student	幕末高校生	Masato Tsujino; Hoshi Mamoru	Sci-Fi. Based on the short story Remaining Snow.
1998	Japan	Yoshinobu Tokugawa	徳川慶喜		Based on The last shogun Tokugawa Yoshinobu.
1998	Japan	Shinsengumi Keppuroku	新選組血風録	Eiichi Kudo; Kōsei Saitō; Toshio Masuda; Akinori Matsuo; Umeo Minamino; Naoki Uesugi	Drama. Based on Shinsengumi Keppūroku.
2000	Japan	One string koto	一絃の琴		Based on the novel One string koto.
2000	Japan	Tree in the Sun	陽だまりの樹	Gisaburō Sugii	Animated period drama. Based on the manga Tree in the Sun.
2004	Japan	Shinsengumi!	新選組!		Period drama.
2006-7	Japan	Intrigue in the Bakumatsu – Irohanihoheto	幕末機関説 いろはにほへと	Ryôsuke Takahashi	Web anime.
2008	Japan	Atsuhime	篤姫	Motohiko Sano	Period drama. Based on the novel Atsuhime Tenshoin.
2010	Japan	Hakuoki: Record of the Jade Blood	薄桜鬼 碧血録		Period drama. Based the Hakuoki video games series.
2011	Japan	Shinsengumi Keppuroku	新選組血風録		Based on Shinsengumi Keppūroku.
2012	Japan	Tree in the Sun	陽だまりの樹		Drama. Based on the manga Tree in the Sun.
2013	Japan	Yae's Sakura	八重の桜		History. About Niijima Yae.
2015	Japan	Burning Flower	花燃ゆ	Yoshio Watanabe; Hajime Suenaga	Period drama. About Miwako Kadori.
2018	Japan	Black Lecture Hall's Rokubee	黒書院の六兵衛	Toshio Lee	Drama. Based on the novel Rokubei of Kuroshoin covering the Fall of Edo.
2018	Japan	Segodon	西郷どん	Yūsuke Noda Makoto Bonkabara; Takeshi Okada; Yoshimi Ishizuka; Yūsuke Horiuchi; Keisuke Ōshima	Drama. Based on the novel Saigo Don! about Saigō Takamori.
2021	Japan	Reach Beyond the Blue Sky	青天を衝け		Drama. About Shibusawa Eiichi.

== Satsuma Rebellion ==
=== Films ===
Year	Country	Main title (Alternative title)	Original title (Original script)	Director	Subject
1935	Empire of Japan	Oyuki the Virgin	マリヤのお雪	Kenji Mizoguchi	Drama. Based on the short story Boule de Suif and a play Join Bus.
1938	Empire of Japan	The Giant	巨人傳	Mansaku Itami	Drama. Based on Les Misérables.
1962	Japan	Young warrior of tragic love	悲恋の若武者	Masaki Nishiyama	Based on the single Young warrior of tragic love.
2003	United States; New Zealand; Japan	The Last Samurai		Edward Zwick	Drama.
2010	Japan	Hanjiro	半次郎	Shô Igarashi	Drama. About Kirino Toshiaki.

=== Television films ===
Year	Country	Main title (Alternative title)	Original title (Original script)	Director	Subject
1964	Japan	Saigo bill	西郷札	Katsumi Yamada	Based on the short story Saigo bill.
1991	Japan	Seicho Matsumoto's 40th anniversary as a writer Saigo bill	松本清張作家活動40周年記念 西郷札	Susumu Ooka	Based on the short story Saigo bill.

=== Television series ===
Year	Country	Main title (Alternative title)	Original title (Original script)	Director	Subject
1987	Japan	Tabarazaka	田原坂	Buichi Saitō	History. About Saigō Takamori.
1990	Japan	As if to fly	翔ぶが如く		Period drama. Based on the novel As if to fly about Saigō Takamori and Ōkubo Toshimichi.
