= This Bloody Blundering Business =

- Directed by: Peter Davis
- Written by: Peter Davis
- Produced by: Peter Davis
- Cinematography: Peter Davis
- Release date: 1971
- Running time: 30 minutes
- Country: United States

This Bloody Blundering Business is a 1971 American short documentary film directed, written and produced by Peter Davis. It examines the American occupation of the Philippines, following the Spanish–American War. The film is characterized by its ragtime music combined with dramatically understated revelations of the attitudes of the Americans towards the native Filipinos.

== Synopsis ==
According to the film, the Americans came to the Philippines for one reason: to civilize the people. William McKinley's Benevolent assimilation was, he said, a way to educate and civilize their "little brown brothers", the Filipinos, and leave the country once it is ready to handle its own government.

== Director ==
Peter Davis was a British-Canadian film director and producer whose films include, among many others, South Africa: the White Laager, a history of Afrikaner nationalism, Remember Mandela, which was shown on the first day of the Democratic National Convention in Atlanta in 1988, and Anatomy of Violence, which was made in conjunction with Stokely Carmichael and Allen Ginsberg. (Peter Davis is to be distinguished from the American documentary film director of the same name, who is known for his direction of the 1974 documentary Hearts and Minds).

== See also ==
- List of American films of 1971
