= Second Chōshū expedition =

1866 Tokugawa shogunate defeat in Japan

Second Chōshū expedition 第二次長州征討
- Part of Bakumatsu Conflicts
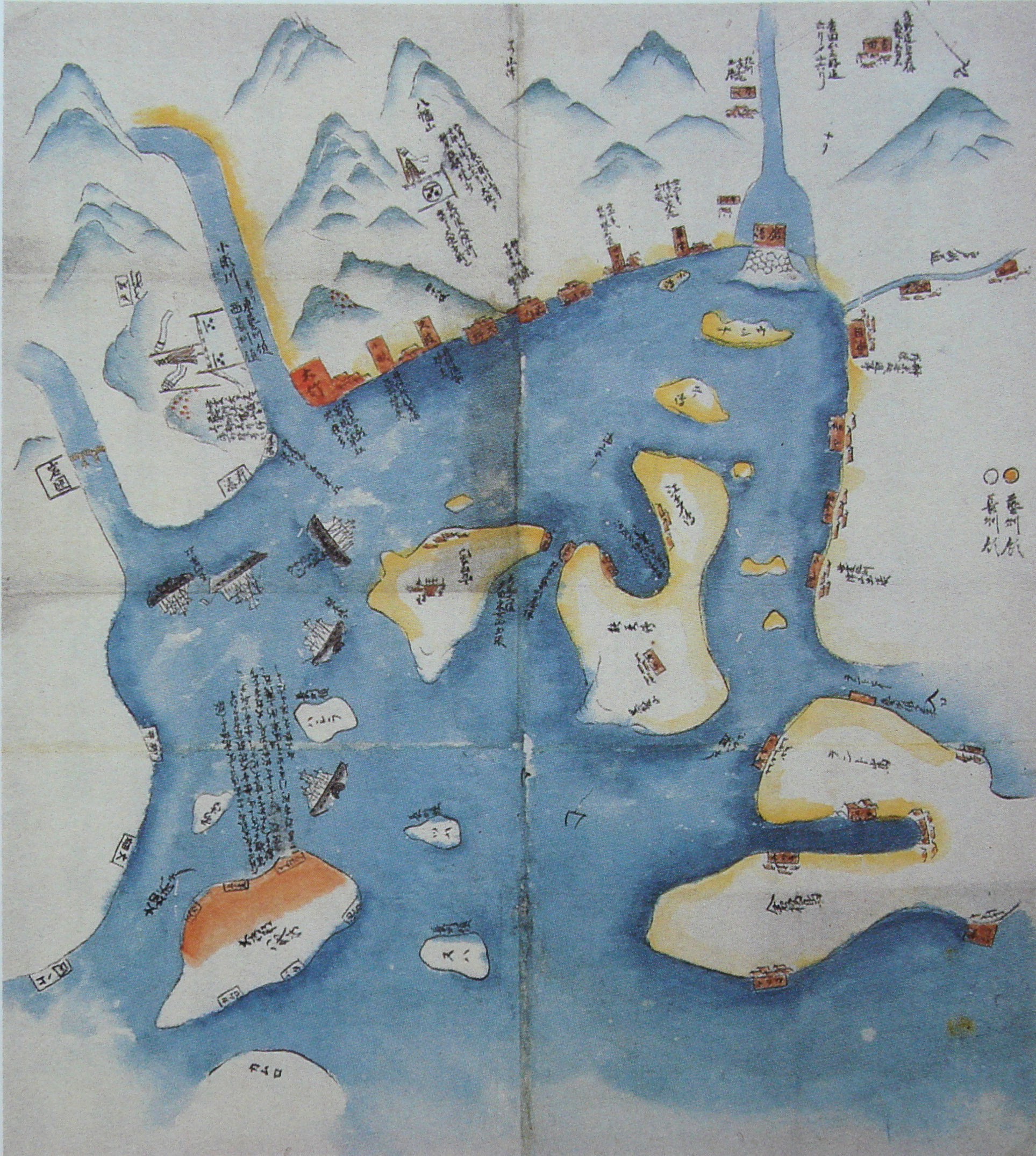
- Operations map of the Second Chōshū expedition.
Date	7 June 1866
Location	Western Japan
Result	Chōshū victory

Belligerents
Chōshū Domain	Tokugawa shogunate; Aizu Domain; Fukuyama Domain; Hamada Domain; Higo Domain; Hikone Domain; Iyo-Matsuyama Domain; Karatsu Domain; Kishū Domain; Kokura Domain; Kurume Domain; Kuwana Domain; Ōgaki Domain; Nakatsu Domain; Takada Domain; Yanagawa Domain

Strength
3,500–4,000	100,000–150,000

Casualties and losses
261 killed	Significant

The Second Chōshū expedition (Japanese: 第二次長州征討), also called the Summer War, was a punitive expedition led by the Tokugawa shogunate against the Chōshū Domain in 1866. It followed the First Chōshū expedition of 1864.

== Campaign ==
The Second Chōshū expedition was announced on 6 March 1865. The operation started on 7 June 1866 with the bombardment of Suō-Ōshima in Yamaguchi Prefecture by the Navy of the Bakufu.

The expedition ended in military disaster for the shogunate troops, as Chōshū forces were modernized and organised effectively. By contrast, the shogunate army was composed of antiquated feudal forces from the Bakufu and numerous neighboring domains, with only small elements of modernised units. Many domains put up only half-hearted efforts, and several outright refused shogunate orders to attack, notably Satsuma who had by this point entered into an alliance with Chōshū.

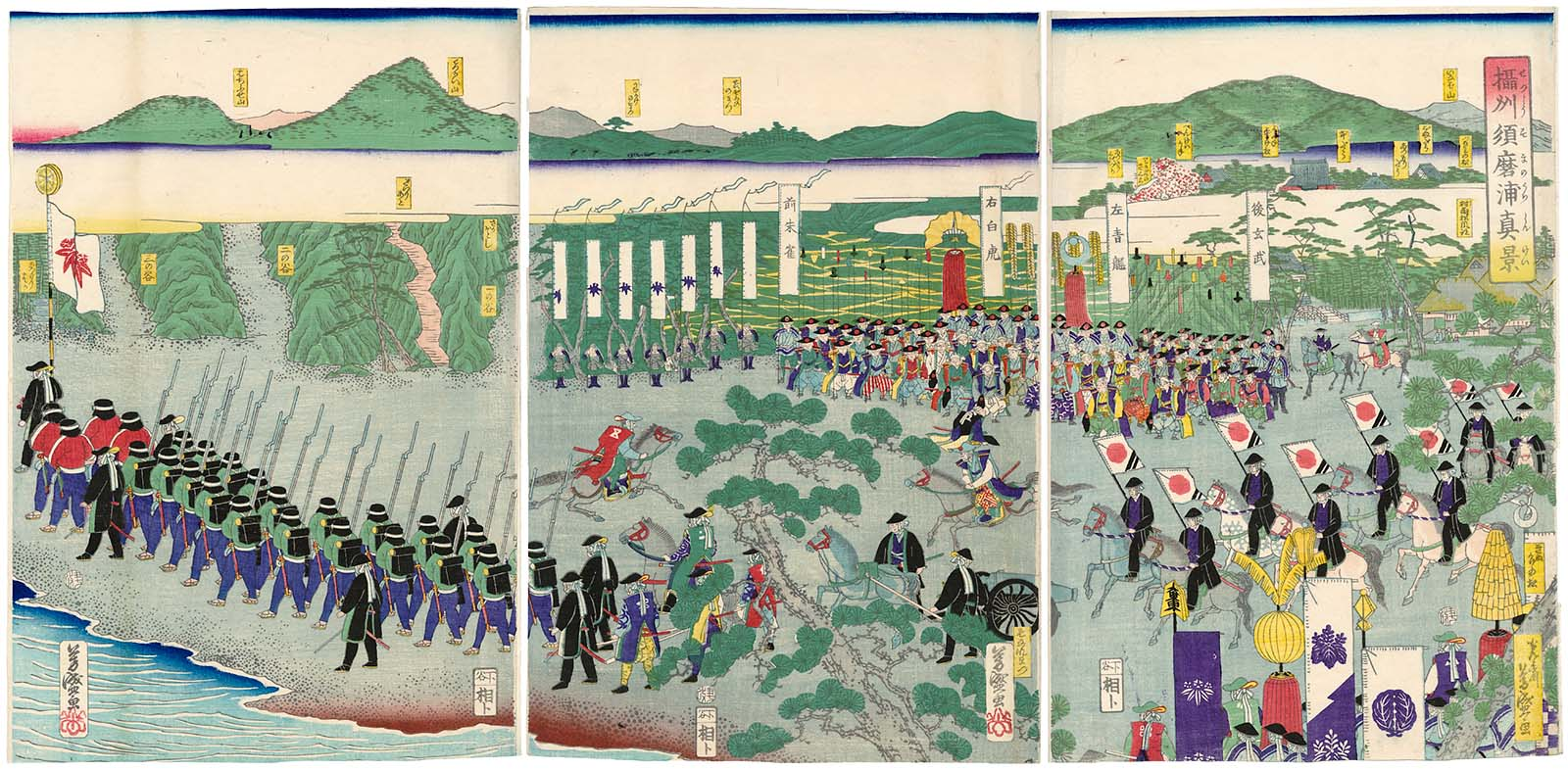
Suma Bay

== Aftermath ==
Tokugawa Yoshinobu, the new shōgun, managed to negotiate a ceasefire after the death of the previous shōgun, but the defeat fatally weakened the shogunate's prestige. Tokugawa military prowess was revealed to be a paper tiger, and it became apparent that the shogunate could no longer impose its will upon the domains. The disastrous campaign is often seen to have sealed the fate of the Tokugawa shogunate.

The defeat stimulated the Bakufu to make numerous reforms to modernize its administration and army. Yoshinobu's younger brother Ashitake was sent to the 1867 Paris Exposition, Western dress replaced Japanese dress at the shogunal court, and collaboration with the French was reinforced leading to the 1867–1868 French military mission to Japan.

== Gallery ==
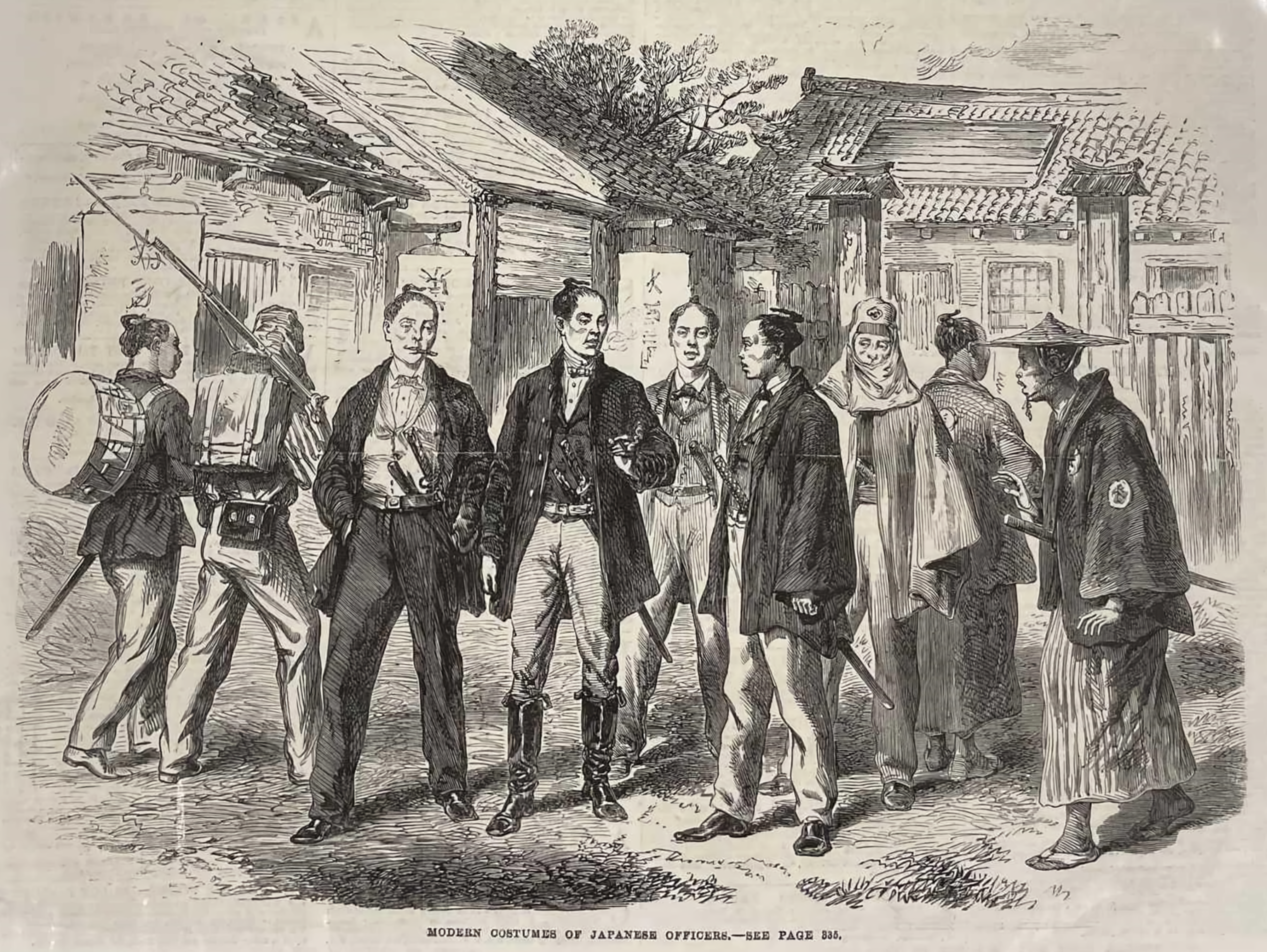
Shogunate modernized troops in 1866

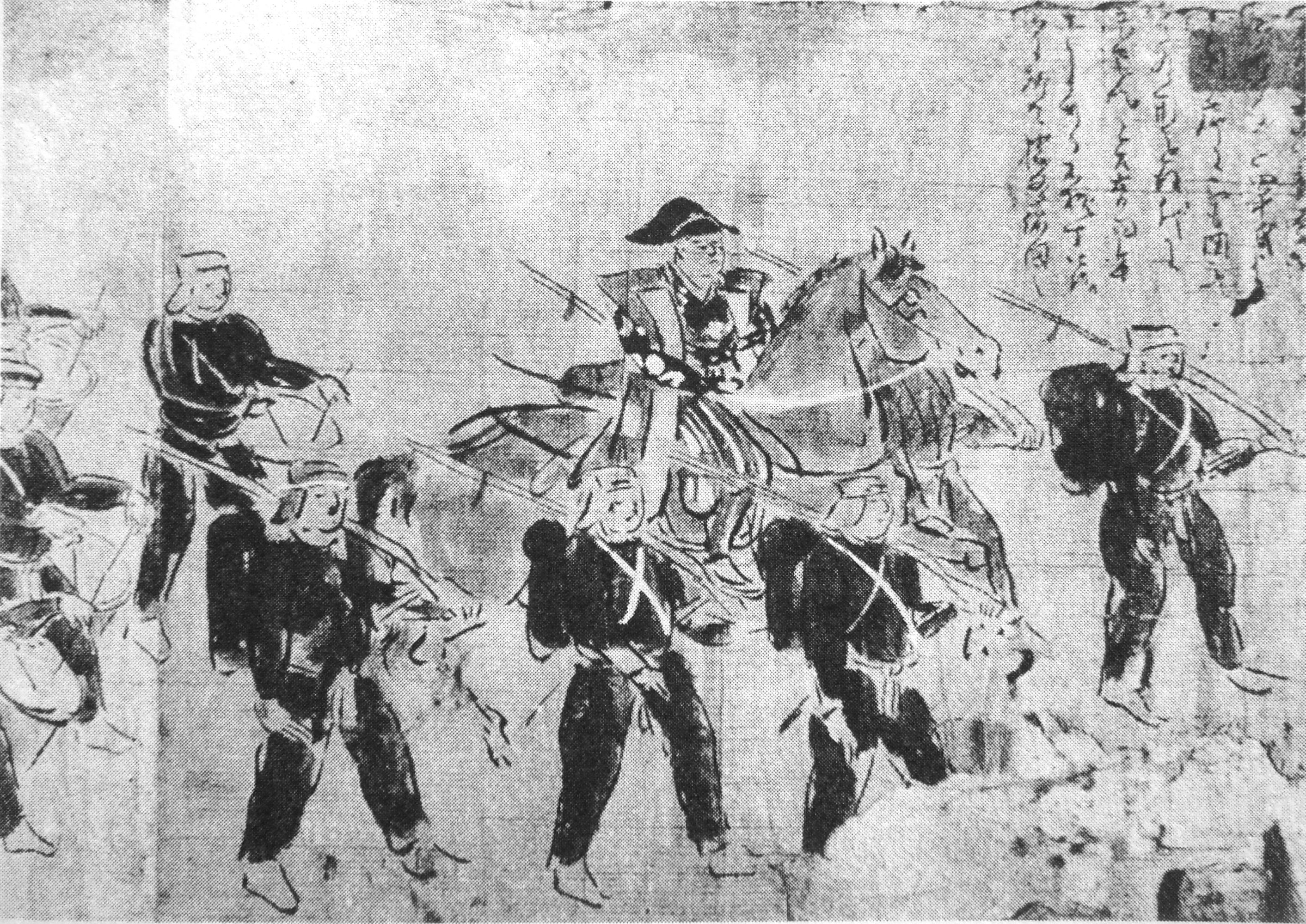
Modernized shogunal troops in the Second Chōshū Expedition

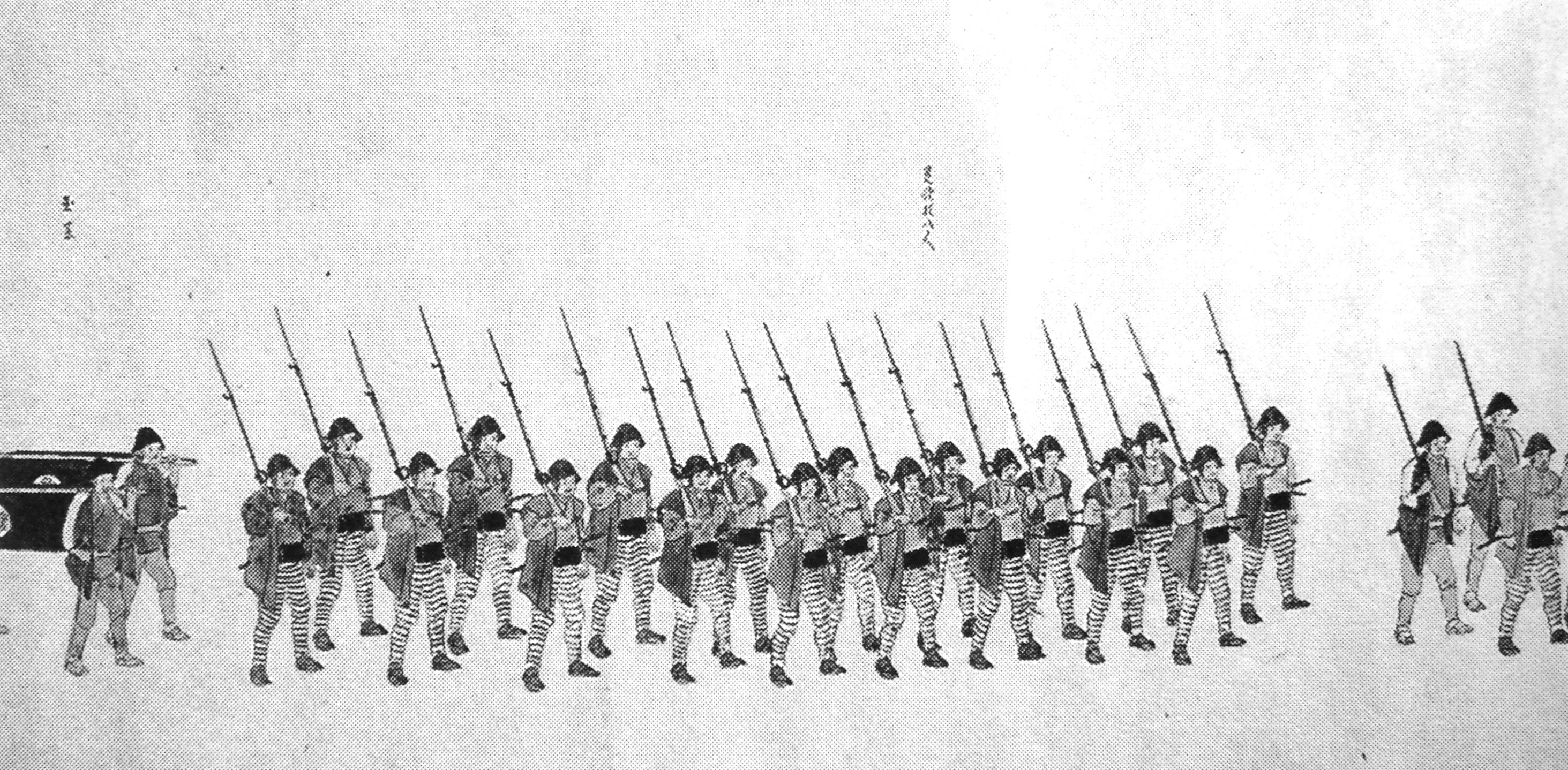
Troops of the Takada Domain in the Second Chōshū Expedition

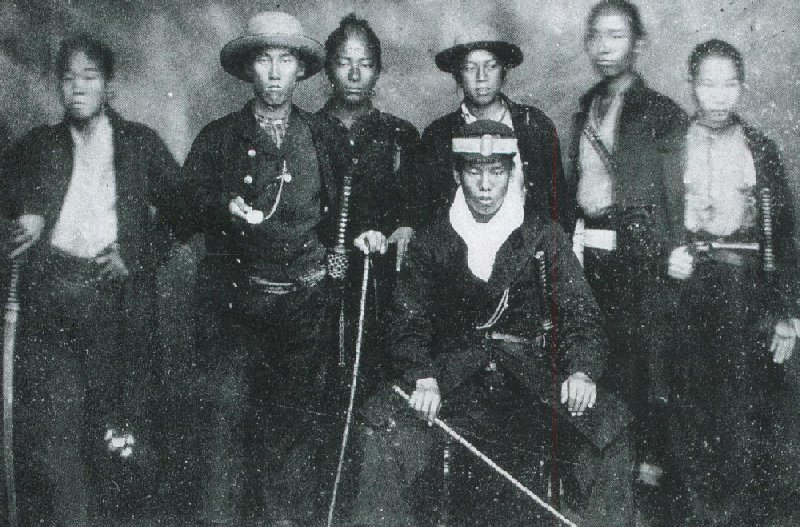
The Chōshū Kiheitai fought against the Bakufu in the Second Chōshū expedition

== See also ==
- First Chōshū expedition
- Bakumatsu
