= First Chōshū expedition =

1864 Japanese military campaign

First Chōshū expedition 第一次長州征討
- Part of Bakumatsu conflicts
Date	September–November 1864
Location	Western Japan
Result	Nominal Shogunate victory

Belligerents
Tokugawa shogunate; Aizu Domain; Satsuma Domain	Chōshū Domain; Sonnō jōi rōnin force

Commanders and leaders
(Tokugawa shogunate) Tokugawa Yoshikatsu	(Chōshū Domain) Mōri Takachika

Strength
About 15,000	Unknown

Casualties and losses
None	Death penalty for the rebel leaders responsible for the Kinmon Incident

The First Chōshū expedition (Japanese: 第一次長州征討) was a punitive military expedition by the Tokugawa shogunate against the Chōshū Domain in September–November 1864. The expedition was in retaliation for Chōshū's role in the attack on the Kyoto Imperial Palace during the Kinmon incident in August 1864. The expedition ended in a nominal victory for the shogunate after a deal negotiated by Saigō Takamori allowed Chōshū to hand over the ringleaders of the Kinmon incident.

== Background ==
The First Chōshū expedition was launched on 1 September 1864.

The conflict finally led to a compromise brokered by the Satsuma Domain at the end of 1864. Although Satsuma initially jumped on the opportunity to weaken its traditional Chōshū enemy, it soon realized that the intention of the Bakufu was first to neutralize Chōshū, and then to neutralize Satsuma. For this reason, Saigō Takamori, who was one of the Commanders of the shogunate forces, proposed to avoid fighting and instead obtain the leaders responsible for the Kinmon incident. Chōshū was relieved to accept, as were the shogunate forces, who were not much interested in battle. Thus ended the First Chōshū expedition without a fight, as a nominal victory for the Bakufu.

== See also ==
- Second Chōshū expedition
- Bakumatsu
