= Kawaji Toshiyoshi =

Japanese politician

Superintendent General Kawaji Toshiyoshi
- 川路 利良

Superintendent General of the Tokyo Metropolitan Police
- In office 24 January 1874 – 13 October 1879
- Monarch: Meiji
- Preceded by: Position established
- Succeeded by: Ōyama Iwao

Personal details
- Born: 17 June 1834 Kagoshima, Japan
- Died: 13 October 1879 (aged 45) Tokyo, Japan

Military service
- Allegiance: Satsuma Domain (until 1871); Empire of Japan (from 1868)
- Branch/service: Imperial Japanese Army
- Rank: Major General
- Commands: Third Brigade (IJA)
- Battles/wars: Boshin War (WIA); Satsuma Rebellion

Kawaji Toshiyoshi (川路 利良; 17 June 1834 – 13 October 1879), also known as Kawaji Toshikane, was a Japanese military general, politician, and samurai during the Meiji period. A Satsuma Domain samurai initially tasked to study foreign systems for application in the Japanese military, Kawaji fought against forces loyal to the Tokugawa shogunate during the Boshin War. Later, his work on setting up the Japanese police at the aftermath of the Meiji Restoration, first as rasotsu, and then as keisatsu, earned him the recognition as the founder of Japan's modern police system (日本警察の父; lit. 'Father of Japanese Police'). Besides his police and military work, he was also noted for his contributions to the development of Kendo, a Japanese martial art.

== Early life and career ==
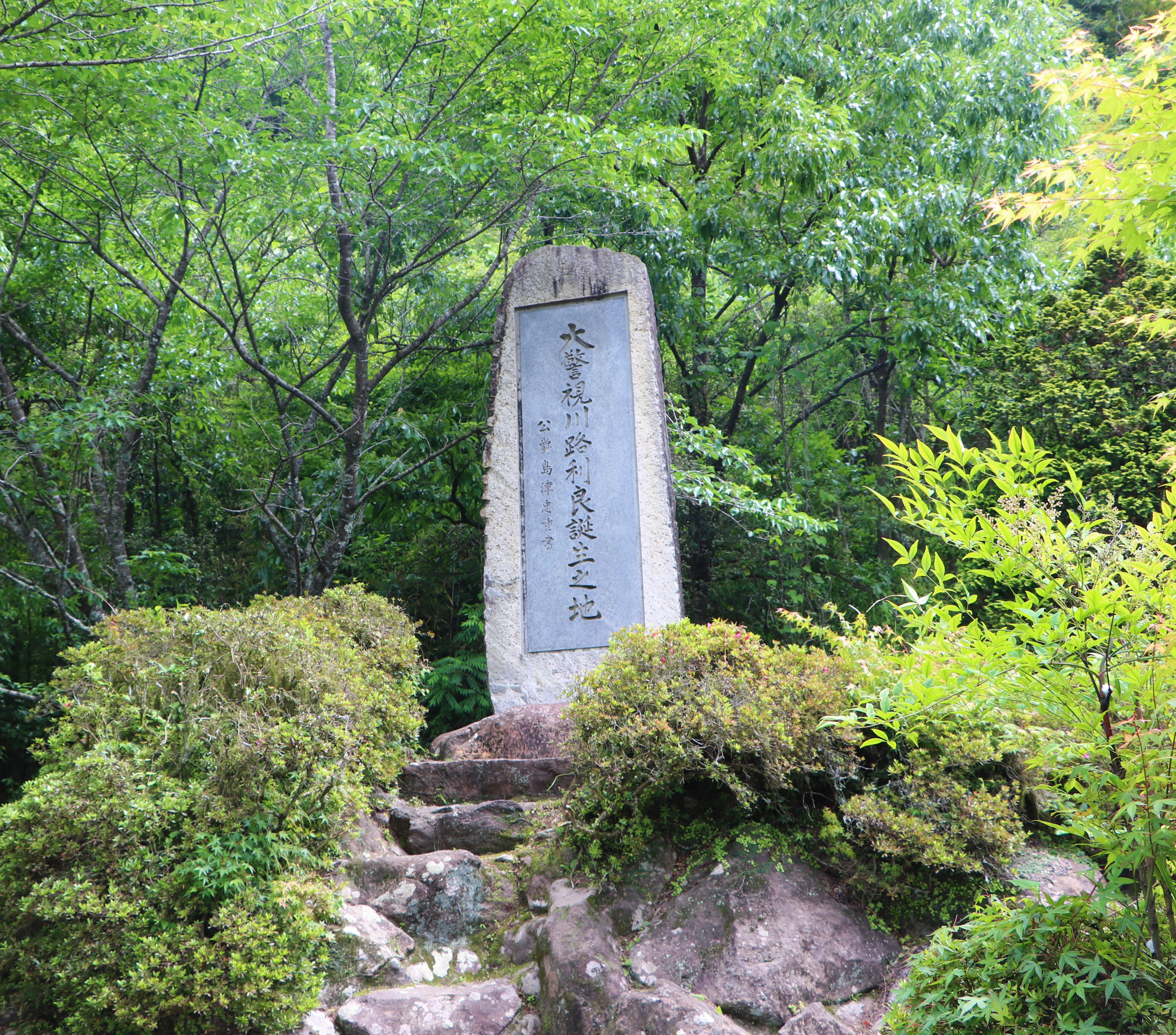
Marker indicating the birthplace of Kawaji Toshiyoshi in Kagoshima.

Born on 17 June 1834 (OS: 11 May 1834) in Kagoshima, Toshiyoshi was the eldest son of Kawaji Toshichika, a samurai of yoriki rank serving Satsuma domain. (While his generally accepted birth year is 1834, some sources give it as either 1829 or 1836.) While serving under Shimazu Hisamitsu, the last Satsuma domain daimyō, he was tasked with studying foreign techniques to apply to the local military. On 20 August 1864, he was involved in the Kinmon incident (Forbidden Gate Incident), wherein he fought against rōnin from Chōshū Domain. Being samurai of Satsuma domain, Toshiyoshi played a significant role in the Boshin War and the Meiji Restoration. He participated in the Battle of Toba–Fushimi (27–31 January 1868), and the Battle of Aizu (6 October – 6 November 1868). Even though wounded at the Battle of Nihonmatsu (29 July 1868), he recovered so that he could participate in the Aizu campaign. After the war he was promoted to Bugyō (奉行, lit. governor or commissioner).

== Police reform ==
Before the 1871 abolition of the han system, which effectively removed the daimyōs and bugyōs from their official positions, the new Japanese capital of Tokyo was patrolled by mixed troops of samurai. On 29 August 1871, a special force, modeled after Western-style National Gendarmerie, was organized. The influence of the French system was highlighted by Fukuzawa Yukichi, who visited France in 1869. Known as rasotsu, Kawaji and Saigō Takamori (a senior samurai also hailing from the Satsuma Domain) were tasked with the recruitment of patrolmen. A total of 2,000 patrolmen initially formed the rasotsu due to Kawaji and Saigo's efforts, and an additional patrolman was recruited for every 3,000 city inhabitants in every prefecture outside Tokyo. As of 1872, the estimated total Japanese population was 34.8 million, around 900,000 of which were in Tokyo. This was followed by the voluntary surrendering of traditional samurai wear and weaponry.

To further study foreign police systems, Kawaji joined the Iwakura Mission, a formal diplomatic trip to the United States, United Kingdom, France, Germany, the Netherlands, Russia, Prussia, Denmark, Sweden, Bavaria, Austria, Italy, and Switzerland. While the primary objective of the mission to renegotiate the unequal treaties was not achieved, Kawaji gathered enough information for him to formulate proposals in reforming the Japanese police, primarily focusing on financing and control structure. He particularly benefited from the professional services of the French lawyer Prosper Gambet-Gross (1801–1868). In 1873, Kawaji's recommendations, which were influenced by the centralized French system, combined with the Confucian model of hierarchy, were approved. In the same year, a police bureau (警保局, Keiho-kyoku) was organized, with Kawaji as its head, and working under the jurisdiction of the Home Ministry, headed by Minister Ōkubo Toshimichi.

== Chief of police ==
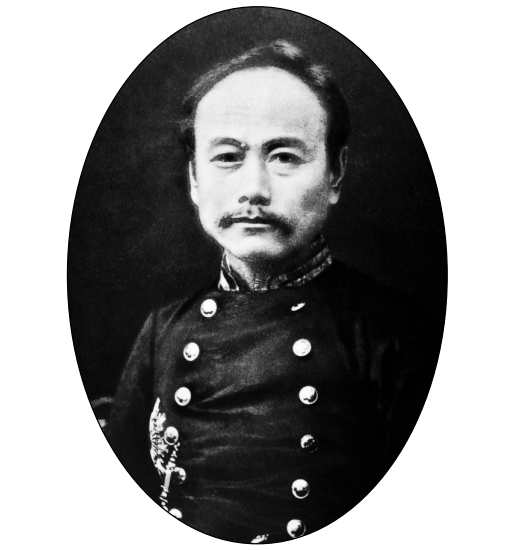
Kawaji Toshiyoshi in uniform

On 9 January 1874, the Keishichō (警視庁, present Tokyo Metropolitan Police Department) was formed, with Kawaji as Daikeishi (Chief of Police, Superintendent-General), having an equivalent rank of major general. Meanwhile, the policemen were re-branded as keisatsu (けいさつ), a name which has been retained to this day. By 1876, the total number of Tokyo policemen increased to 6,000. Kawaji was also careful in recruiting former enemies during the Boshin War, including elements of the Shinsengumi (新選組, lit. New Selected Group), the special police force organized by the Tokugawa shogunate in 1863. One of the better known former Shinsengumi members in the police force was Third Unit Captain Saitō Hajime, who became a police inspector under the name of Fujita Gorō. He is believed to have been recruited by Kawaji himself. Kawaji also recruited Gambet-Gross as his formal adviser, who would later assist in numerous court cases, especially those involving foreigners and extraterritoriality. While Kawaji himself did not possess any mastery of the French language, he acquired the services of the interpreter Numa Morikazu, who accompanied him during the Iwakura Mission.

=== Philosophy ===
While Kawaji was not known as an administrator, despite having a reputation comparable with the Three Great Nobles of the Restoration (維新の三傑, Ishin no Sanketsu), some regard him as the one who "established the Meiji political system" and "the great benefactor of the imperial police." In his work entitled Keisatsu Shugan (警察手眼, Hands and Eyes of the Police), he emphasized that the police exists as a preventive force tasked to complement the military. He treated the societal structure as similar to a family, wherein the government serves as a parent, and the people as its children. According to Kawaji the role of the police is that of a nanny or nursemaid, who understands the proper use of their vested powers. Further using the analogy of family, Kawaji posits that the people ought to become independent and self-reliant, and that their rights must not be violated. He also believed in a police bound by duty, yet affectionate with the public, and a chief of police in command, rather than directly involved. He aimed to instill strict discipline among policemen. He himself slept only around four hours a day when on duty. One motto of his for police officers was this: "no sleep, no rest." While the Japanese police was later incorporated with German influences, his ideals emphasizing their role in promoting national peace was carried over, and to an extent, contributed to the development of thought control as a state policy in the years leading to the Second World War.

=== Contribution to kendo ===
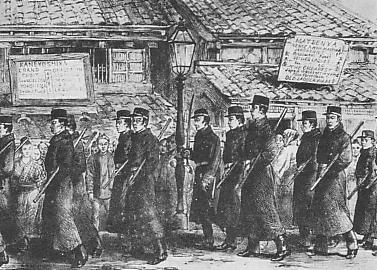
Japanese police carrying swords in October 1877

In 1876, five years after a voluntary surrender of swords, the government banned the use of swords by the surviving samurai and initiated sword hunts. Meanwhile, in an attempt to standardize the sword styles (kenjutsu) used by policemen, Kawaji recruited swordsmen from various schools to come up with a unified swordsmanship style. This led to the rise of the Battotai (抜刀隊, lit. Drawn Sword Corps), which mainly featured sword-bearing policemen. However, it proved difficult to integrate all sword arts, which led to a compromise of ten practice moves (kata) for police training. Difficulties of integration notwithstanding, this integration effort led to the development of kendo, which remains in use to date. In 1878, Kawaji wrote a book on swordsmanship, entitled Gekiken Saikō-ron (Revitalizing Swordsmanship), wherein he stressed that sword styles should not disappear with modernization, considering that other countries have been fascinated with them, but should be integrated as necessary skills for the police. He draws a particular example from his experience with the Satsuma Rebellion. The Junsa Kyōshūjo (Patrolman's Training Institute), founded in 1879, provided a curriculum which allowed policemen to study the sword arts during their off-hours (gekiken). In the same year, Kawaji wrote another book on swordsmanship, entitled Kendo Saikō-ron (Revitalizing Kendo), wherein he defended the significance of such sword art training for the police. While the institute remained active only until 1881, the police continued to support such practice.

=== Satsuma Rebellion ===
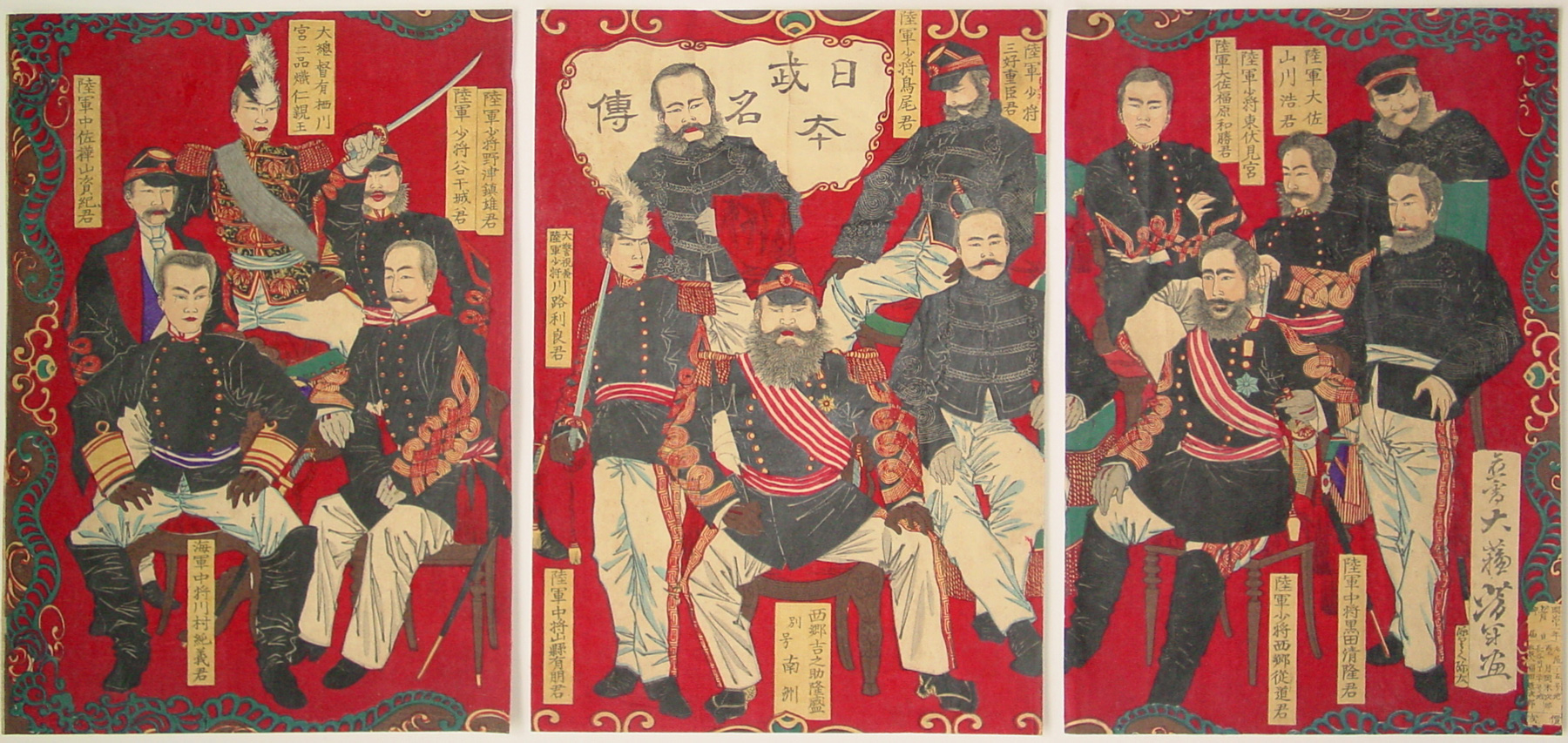
Kawaji Toshiyoshi (in center panel with Saigō Takamori, Torio Koyata, Yamagata Aritomo, and Miyoshi Shigeomi) considered as one of Japan's famous soldiers in this 1878 woodblock print

In February 1877, British diplomat Ernest Mason Satow noted allegations, which linked Kawaji and other high-ranking government officials, including Minister Ōkubo, with a planned assassination of Saigō Takamori, who, by this time, had already resigned from the government. What bolstered the credibility of this allegation was the leave of absence Kawaji had granted to a number of policemen, who proceeded to Kagoshima. Satow later spoke with Navy Minister Katsu Kaishū, who cleared Ōkubo of connection to the assassination attempt, which was never carried out, but affirmed Kawaji's intention to assassinate Saigō to prevent a civil war. A further confirmation of this intention was the confession of Nakahara Hisao, a sho-keibu (corporal), who was supposedly the assassin assigned to eliminate Saigō. However, the Satsuma Rebellion had already begun in response to the rumored assassination, much to Saigō's dismay, especially since he and Kawaji had been friends.

On 19 February 1877, the Kumamoto Castle was attacked by around 20,000 samurai from the Satsuma Domain. True to his principles of the police working together with the military, Kawaji in his capacity as a major general led the Third Brigade, accompanying Major General Ōyama Iwao of the Imperial Japanese Army, who led the Fifth Brigade. Similar to Kawaji, Ōyama had also visited France to study. By 23 June, Kawaji, this time promoted as lieutenant general, and his division, had already entered Kagoshima, Saigō's headquarters (around 170 kilometers south of Kumamoto), reinforcing the beleaguered Admiral Kawamura Sumiyoshi and breaking the rebel strength. Saigō and his remaining forces, numbering around 500, were ultimately vanquished at the Battle of Shiroyama on 24 September 1877.

=== Security issues ===
On 14 May 1878, less than a year after the death of Kido Takayoshi (who was also part of the Iwakura Mission) and the Satsuma Rebellion, Minister Ōkubo Toshimichi was assassinated by Shimada Ichirō and six other samurai from the Kaga Domain (or Kanazawa Domain). The assassination of a high-level government official such as Ōkubo, the last of the Three Great Nobles of the Restoration (the other two being Saigō and Kido), raised concerns with the internal security being provided both by the police and the military. Nine days after the assassination, Emperor Meiji announced his intentions to tour the country, particularly the Hokurikudō and the Tōkaidō regions. The Hokurikudō tour would also mean visiting Kanazawa. As a precautionary measure, Kawaji detained 18 Kanazawa samurai who were suspected of holding extremist views, and replaced some of the soldiers stationed in Kanazawa. Considering that Kawaji was also included on the alleged hit list of Ōkubo's assassins, measures were also required to ensure his own safety as the head of Emperor Meiji's security detail. The emperor safely arrived in Kanazawa on 2 October, and departed on 5 October.

== Death ==
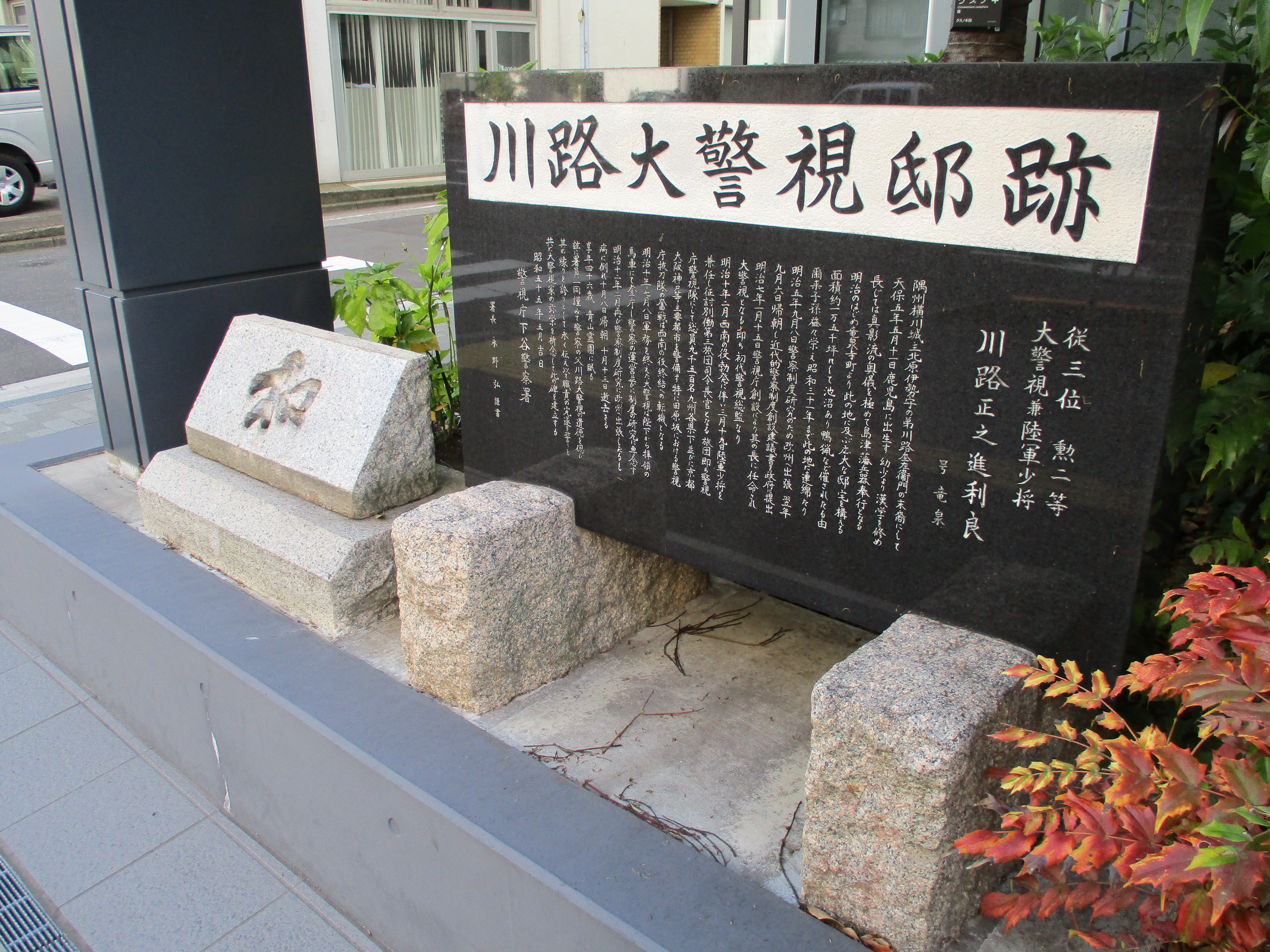
Marker indicating Kawaji Toshiyoshi's residence.

In 1879, Kawaji travelled to France once more for a study mission, which was supposed to last until 1880. However, his mission was cut short, and he died upon his return to Japan, in Tokyo, on 13 October 1879. His death was publicly announced five days later, and he was buried in Aoyama Cemetery in Tokyo.

== In popular culture ==
Kawaji was one of the historical figures included in the story of Rurouni Kenshin.

The Filipino novel Revolution: 80 Days (2022) featured Kawaji as one of Japan's top officials.

Gaku Hamada portrayed Kawaji Toshiyoshi in 2025 Netflix TV series Last Samurai Standing, streamed in November 2025.
