= Toshiyoshi =

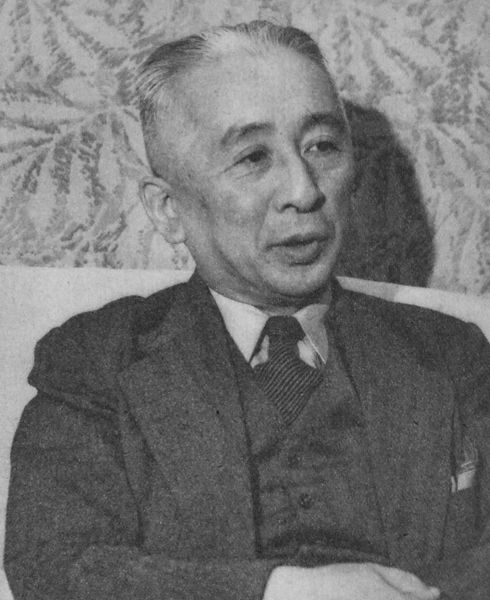
- Toshiyoshi Miyazawa (1899–1976), Japanese jurist
- Pronunciation: toɕijoɕi (IPA)
- Gender: Male

Origin
- Origin: Japanese
- Meaning: Different meanings depending on the kanji used

Other names
- Alternative spelling: Tosiyosi (Kunrei-shiki) Tosiyosi (Nihon-shiki) Toshiyoshi (Hepburn)

Toshiyoshi is a masculine Japanese given name.

== Written forms ==
Toshiyoshi can be written using many different combinations of kanji characters. Here are some examples:

- 敏義, "agile, justice"
- 敏吉, "agile, good luck"
- 敏善, "agile, virtuous"
- 敏芳, "agile, virtuous/fragrant"
- 敏良, "agile, good"
- 敏慶, "agile, congratulate"
- 俊義, "talented, justice"
- 俊吉, "talented, good luck"
- 俊善, "talented, virtuous"
- 俊芳, "talented, virtuous/fragrant"
- 俊良, "talented, good"
- 俊嘉, "talented, excellent"
- 利義, "benefit, justice"
- 利吉, "benefit, good luck"
- 利芳, "benefit, virtuous/fragrant"
- 利良, "benefit, good"
- 寿義, "long life, justice"
- 寿吉, "long life, good luck"
- 寿良, "long life, good"
- 年義, "year, justice"
- 年吉, "year, good luck"
- 年能, "year, capacity"
- 雋吉, "genius, good luck"

The name can also be written in hiragana としよし or katakana トシヨシ.

== Notable people with the name ==
- Toshiyoshi Ito (伊藤 雋吉, 1840–1921), Imperial Japanese Navy admiral.
- Toshiyoshi Kawaji (川路 利良, 1829–1879), Japanese politician.
- Toshiyoshi Miyazawa (宮澤 俊義, 1899–1976), Japanese jurist.
