= Battotai =

Special police squad in Meiji-era Japan

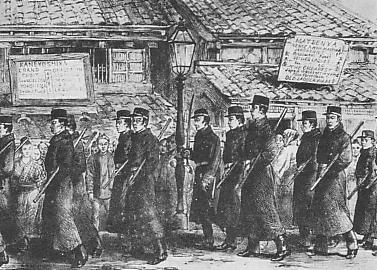
The Battōtai

Battōtai (抜刀隊; Drawn-Sword Regiment) were a special police squad formed in Japan by the Meiji government in 1877 during the Satsuma Rebellion. The detachment was armed with Japanese swords. The members of Battotai defeated the rebels in the Battle of Tabaruzaka. Their success in sword fighting led to a renewed interest in the art of kenjutsu, which had been abandoned after the Meiji restoration, and, as a result, the formation of modern kendo.

== History ==
During the multi-day siege by the government forces of Tabaruzaka, where the rebels of Saigo Takamori were entrenched, it turned out that the troops were suffering heavy damage from the attacks of the rebels in close combat. This was due to the fact that most of the government forces were conscripted "common people", peasants and townspeople who had never learned to fight with a sword. In a sword fight with the Saigo samurai, they invariably died. To change the situation, the police command, among which there were many people of samurai origin, approached the army commander Yamagata Aritomo with a proposal to recruit a separate squad of capable swordsmen. Yamagata gave permission, and such a detachment of one hundred people was recruited.

On March 14, 1877, the Battotai, by order of the command, attacked Mount Tabaruzaka. After two days of battle with the Satsuma rebels, the detachment suffered heavy losses of 25 dead and 54 injured. Despite the fact that the sword, at the end of the 19th century, was considered a long-obsolete weapon, Battotai revived interest among Japanese in Kenjutsu, which was abandoned after the defeat of the shogunate. The greatest supporter of the revival of kenjutsu was the "father of the Japanese police" Kawaji Toshiyoshi. He published the work "On the question of the restoration of fencing" (Japanese: 撃剣再興論 Gekiken saikō-ron), and in 1879 the police department began hiring instructors to train their officers in fencing.
