= Satsuma Rebellion =

1877 Japanese samurai revolt

- Part of the Meiji Restoration and the Shizoku rebellions
- Map of the campaign
Date	29 January – 24 September 1877 (7 months, 3 weeks and 5 days)
Location	Kyūshū, Japan
Result	Imperial victory

Belligerents
Empire of Japan	Satsuma Domain

Commanders and leaders
(Empire of Japan) Emperor Meiji; (Empire of Japan) Prince Arisugawa; (Empire of Japan) Yamagata Aritomo; (Empire of Japan) Kawamura Sumiyoshi; (Empire of Japan) Kuroda Kiyotaka; (Empire of Japan) Tani Tateki	(Satsuma Domain) Saigō Takamori ‡‡; (Satsuma Domain) Kirino Toshiaki †; (Satsuma Domain) Beppu Shinsuke †

Strength
51,800 Imperial Army; 5,054 Imperial Guard; 18,000 police (including unknown number of battōtai)	12,000 infantry; 200 artillerymen; 60 artillery pieces

Casualties and losses
15,000 killed and wounded	nearly all killed and wounded; 4,000 captured or deserted

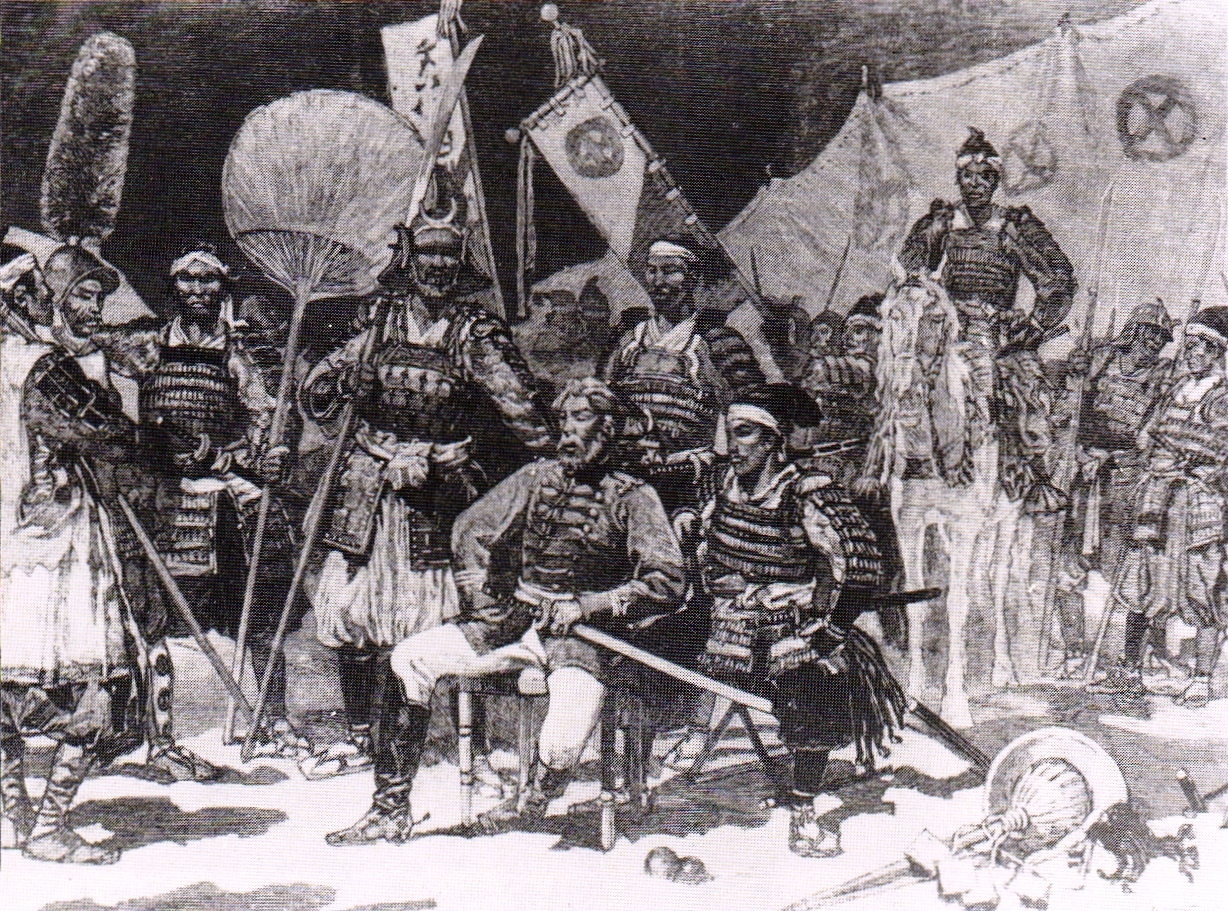
Saigō Takamori (seated, in French uniform), surrounded by his officers, in traditional attire. News article in Le Monde illustré, 1877. This painting was imagined and depicted by a French illustrator, portraying a central figure seated in a Western-style military uniform on a chair, likely based on hearsay as Saigō Takamori. The entourage surrounding him, all dressed in heavily armored samurai attire from the 1500s, is entirely a product of the French artist's imagination and is almost entirely inaccurate.

The Satsuma Rebellion, known more widely in Japanese as the Seinan War (Japanese: 西南戦争, Hepburn: Seinan Sensō; lit. 'Southwestern War'), was a revolt of disaffected samurai against the new imperial government of the Empire of Japan, nine years into the Meiji era. Its name comes from the Satsuma Domain, which had been influential in the Restoration and became home to unemployed samurai after military reforms rendered their status obsolete. The rebellion lasted from 29 January until 24 September 1877, when it was decisively crushed, and its leader, Saigō Takamori, was shot and mortally wounded.

Saigō's rebellion was the last and most serious of a series of armed uprisings against the new government of the Empire of Japan, the predecessor state to modern Japan. The rebellion was very expensive for the government, which forced it to make numerous monetary reforms including leaving the gold standard. The conflict effectively ended the samurai class and ushered in modern warfare fought by conscript soldiers instead of military nobles. It is the most recent civil war to have been fought in Japan.

== Background ==
Although Satsuma had been one of the key players in the Meiji Restoration and the Boshin War, and although many men from Satsuma had risen to influential positions in the new Meiji government, there was growing dissatisfaction with the direction the country was taking. The modernization of the country meant the abolition of the privileged social status of the samurai class - contrasting with the original reformist vision of creating a parliament of Daimyo, and had undermined their financial position. The very rapid and massive changes to Japanese culture, language, dress and society appeared to many samurai to be a betrayal of the jōi ('expel the barbarian') portion of the sonnō jōi justification used to overthrow the former Tokugawa shogunate.

Saigō Takamori was a well known and powerful Samurai lord of his time and one of the senior leaders of the Satsuma clan. He fiercely supported the imperial faction throughout Bakumatsu and was one of the prominent restoration figures during the Boshin war. He was especially concerned about growing political corruption – popular prints depicted the rebel army with banners bearing the words shinsei-kōtoku (新政厚徳; lit. 'new government, rich virtue'). Saigō was a strong proponent of war with Korea in the Seikanron debate of 1873. At one point, he offered to visit Korea in person and to provide a casus belli by the likely outcome of his being assassinated by Korean nationalists. Saigō expected both that a war would ultimately be successful for Japan and also that the initial stages of it would offer a means by which the samurai whose cause he championed could find meaningful and beneficial death. When the plan was rejected, Saigō resigned from all of his government positions in protest and returned to his hometown of Kagoshima, as did many other Satsuma ex-samurai in the military and police forces.

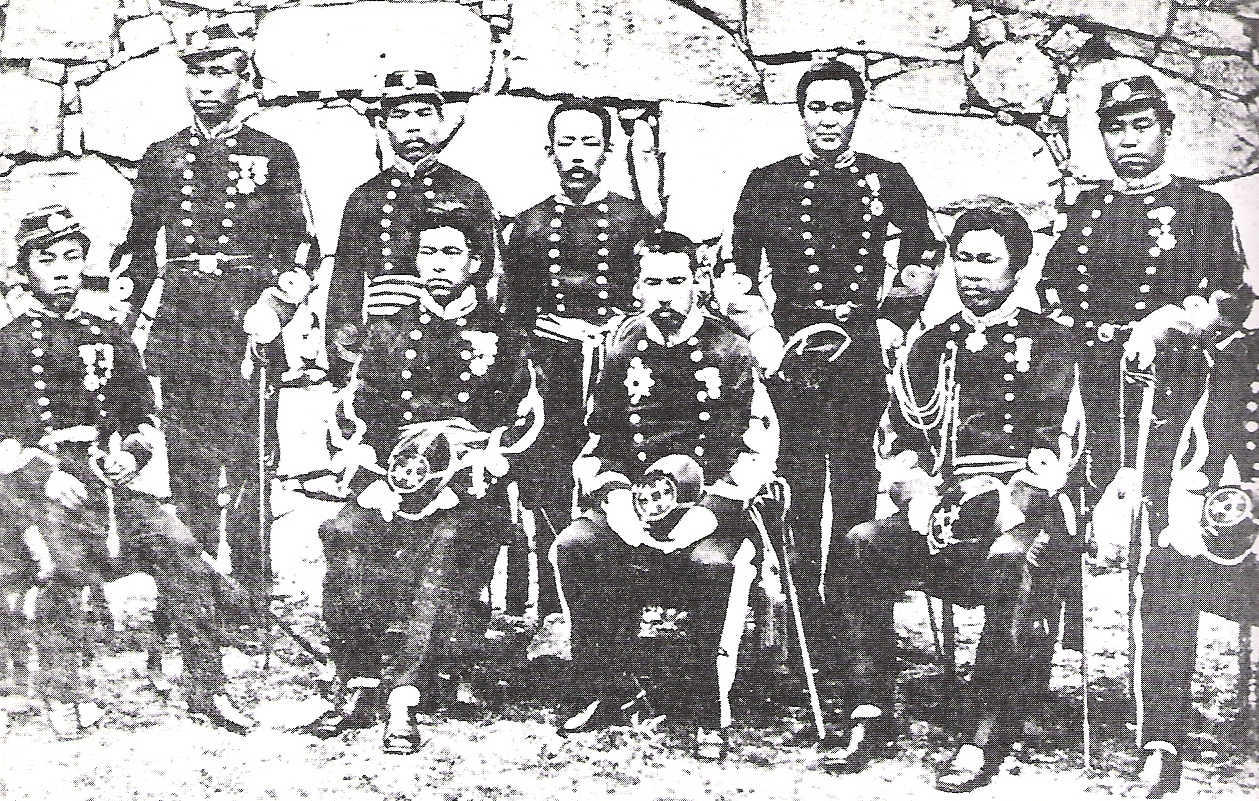
Imperial Japanese Army officers of the Kumamoto garrison, who resisted Saigō Takamori's siege, 1877

To help support and employ these men, in 1874 Saigō established a private academy known as the Shi-gakkō in Kagoshima. Soon 132 branches were established all over the prefecture. The "training" provided was not purely academic: although the Chinese classics were taught, all students were required to take part in weapons training and instruction in tactics. Saigō also started an artillery school. The schools resembled paramilitary political organizations more than anything else, and they enjoyed the support of the governor of Satsuma, who appointed disaffected samurai to political offices, where they came to dominate the Kagoshima government. Support for Saigō was so strong that Satsuma had effectively seceded from the central government by the end of 1876. This was similar to the Satsuma and Choshu's position during Bakumatsu, in which the Shogunate maintained little control over these domains.

== Status of combatants ==
=== Imperial military ===
As per the 1873 conscription law, Japan was divided into six military districts with conscripts drawn by lots, with seven years service (three active and four reserve) for the conscripted and service for 20 years in the national militia for those not chosen for active service.

A cavalry squadron contained 150 in wartime. However, due to difficulties in securing horses suited for modern war, only three squadrons were available, for a total of 450 cavalrymen (including the Imperial guard squadron). An infantry regiment had three battalions of 1,088 men and 16 battalion staff each. 14 such regiments existed for a total of 45,920 infantry. An engineer company contained 150 men. The engineers had 10 companies, giving a total of 1,500 engineers. The train companies contained 80 men. There were a total of six companies giving a total of 480 men. There were also nine coastal artillery battalions of 100 men, a total of 900 men.

The mobile artillery consisted of 12 mountain gun batteries with 1,920 men and six field gun batteries with 780 men, with each battery containing 12 guns. A total of 2,700 men with 108 guns were in the mobile artillery.

The imperial guard, a force drawn from the pro-imperial forces of the Boshin War, was organised into two regiments of infantry (4,384), one cavalry squadron (150), one artillery battalion (12 guns and 290 men), one engineer company (150), and a train company (80 men), giving a total of 5,054 men.

==== Imperial police ====
In 1871, the imperial government organised the Rasotsu, which expanded rapidly from its original 3,000 to 18,000 in 1877. These policemen were militarised and saw action throughout the rebellion. During the conflict, the government side expended, on average, 322,000 rounds of ammunition and 1,000 artillery shells per day.

=== Rebel forces ===
The forces of Saigo were only partly modernised, with an ad hoc organisation made in 1877 with 6 infantry battalions of 2,000 men, each with 10 companies of 200 per battalion. There was little to no cavalry in the rebel army and only 200 gunners for the 28 mountain, 2 field and 30 mortar pieces assembled by the rebels.

== Prelude ==
Word of Saigō's academies was greeted with considerable concern in Tokyo. The government had just dealt with several small but violent samurai revolts in Kyūshū, and they found the prospect of rebellion by the numerous and fierce Satsuma samurai, led by the famous and popular Saigō, an alarming one. In December 1876, the Meiji government sent a police officer named Nakahara Hisao and 57 other men to investigate reports of subversive activities and unrest. The men were captured, and under torture, confessed that they were spies who had been sent to assassinate Saigō. Although Nakahara later repudiated the confession, it was widely believed in Satsuma and was used as justification by the disaffected samurai that a rebellion was necessary in order to "protect Saigō". Fearing a rebellion, the Meiji government sent a warship to Kagoshima to remove the weapons stockpiled at the Kagoshima arsenal on 30 January 1877. This, accompanied by an elimination of samurai rice stipends in 1877, provoked open conflict. Outraged by the government's tactics, 50 students from Saigō's academy attacked the Somuta Arsenal and carried off weapons. Over the next three days, more than 1000 students staged raids on the naval yards and other arsenals.

Presented with this sudden success, the greatly dismayed Saigō was reluctantly persuaded to come out of his semi-retirement to lead the rebellion against the central government.

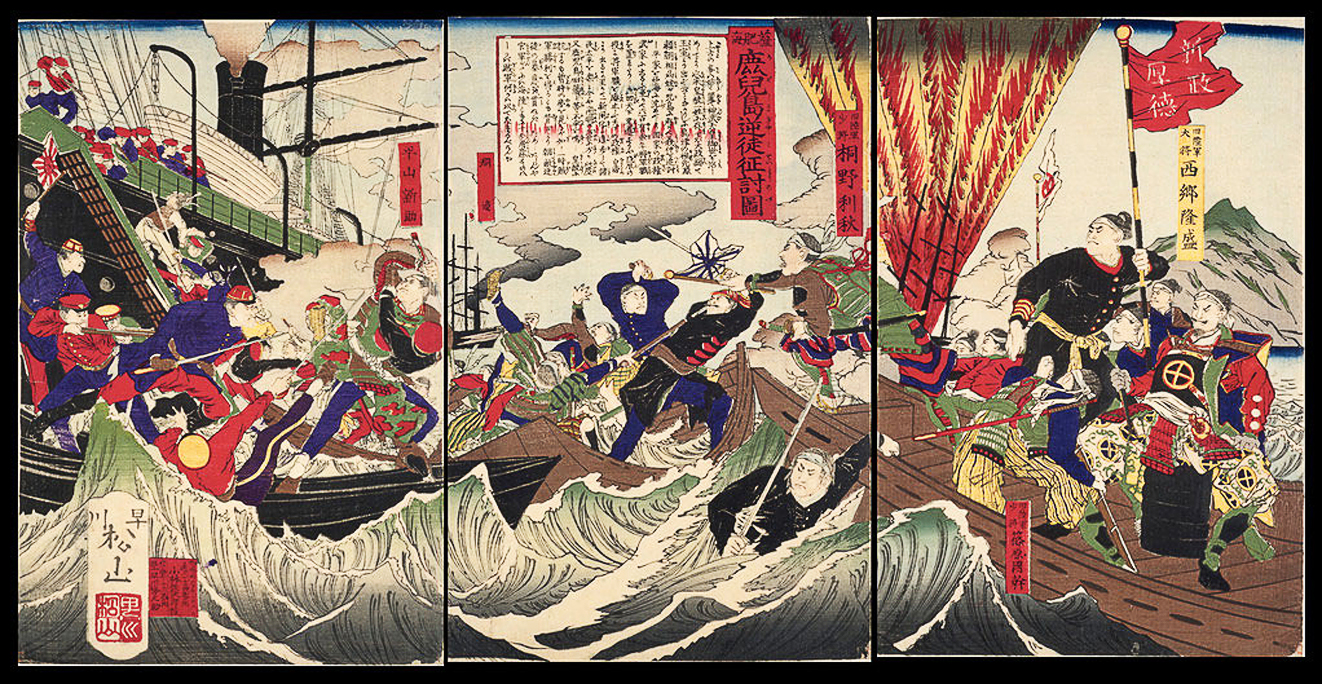
The clash at Kagoshima

In February 1877, the Meiji government dispatched Hayashi Tomoyuki, an official with the Home Ministry with Admiral Kawamura Sumiyoshi in the warship Takao to ascertain the situation. Satsuma's governor, Oyama Tsunayoshi, explained that the uprising was in response to the government's assassination attempt on Saigō, and asked that Admiral Kawamura (Saigō's cousin) come ashore to help calm the situation. After Oyama departed, a flotilla of small ships filled with armed men attempted to board Takao by force, but were repelled. The following day, Hayashi declared to Oyama that he could not permit Kawamura to go ashore when the situation was so unsettled, and that the attack on Takao constituted an act of lèse-majesté.

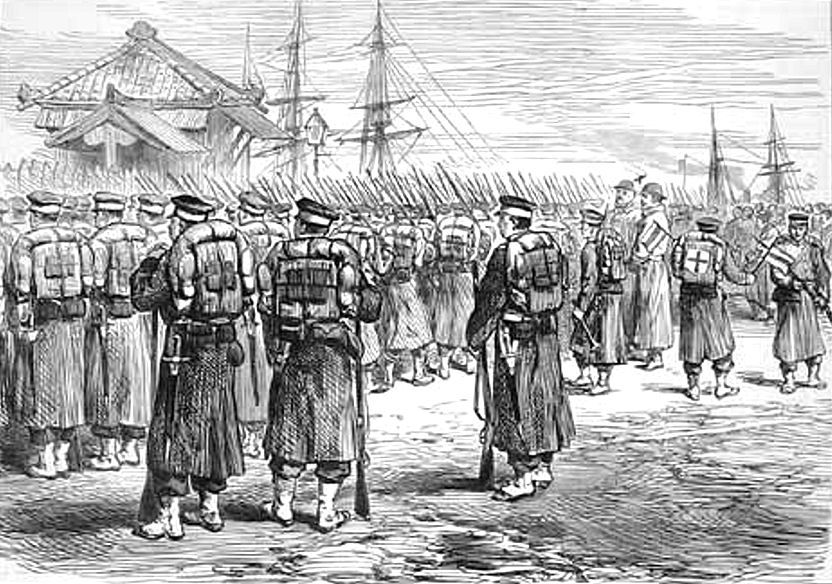
Imperial troops embarking at Yokohama to fight the Satsuma rebellion in 1877

On his return to Kobe on 12 February, Hayashi met with General Yamagata Aritomo and Itō Hirobumi, and it was decided that the Imperial Japanese Army would need to be sent to Kagoshima to prevent the revolt from spreading to other areas of the country sympathetic to Saigō. On the same day, Saigō met with his lieutenants Kirino Toshiaki and Shinohara Kunimoto and announced his intention of marching to Tokyo to ask questions of the government. Rejecting large numbers of volunteers, he made no attempt to contact any of the other domains for support, and no troops were left at Kagoshima to secure his base against an attack. To aid in the air of legality, Saigō wore his army uniform. Marching north, his army was hampered by the deepest snowfall Satsuma had seen in more than 50 years, which, because of the similarity to the weather that had greeted those setting out to enact the Meiji Restoration nine years earlier, was interpreted by some as a sign of divine support.

== The Southwestern War ==
=== Siege of Kumamoto Castle ===
The Satsuma vanguard crossed into Kumamoto Prefecture on 14 February. The commandant of Kumamoto Castle, Major General Tani Tateki had 3,800 soldiers and 600 policemen at his disposal. However, most of the garrison was from Kyūshū, while a significant number of officers were natives of Kagoshima; their loyalties were open to question. Rather than risk desertions or defections, Tani decided to stand on the defensive. On 19 February, the first shots of the war were fired as the defenders of Kumamoto Castle opened fire on Satsuma units attempting to force their way into the castle. Kumamoto Castle, built in 1598, was among the strongest in Japan, but Saigō was confident that his forces would be more than a match for Tani's conscripts, who were still demoralized by the recent Shinpūren rebellion.

On 22 February, the main Satsuma army arrived and attacked Kumamoto Castle in a pincer movement. Fighting continued into the night. Imperial forces fell back, and acting Major Nogi Maresuke of the Kokura Fourteenth Regiment lost the regimental colors in fierce fighting. However, despite their successes, the Satsuma army failed to take the castle and began to realize that the conscript army was not as ineffective as first assumed. After two days of fruitless attack, the Satsuma forces dug into the rock-hard icy ground around the castle and tried to starve the garrison out in a siege. The situation was especially desperate for the defenders as their stores of food and ammunition had been depleted by a warehouse fire shortly before the rebellion began. During the siege, many Kumamoto ex-samurai flocked to Saigō's banner, swelling his forces to around 20,000 men. In the meantime, on March 9, Saigō, Kirino, and Shinohara were stripped of their court ranks and titles.

On the night of 8 April, a force from Kumamoto Castle made a sortie, forcing open a gap in the Satsuma lines and enabling desperately needed supplies to reach the garrison. The main Imperial Army, under General Kuroda Kiyotaka with the assistance of General Yamakawa Hiroshi, arrived in Kumamoto on 12 April, putting the now heavily outnumbered Satsuma forces to flight.

=== Battle of Tabaruzaka ===
On 4 March, Imperial Army General Yamagata ordered a frontal assault against Tabaruzaka, guarding the approaches to Kumamoto, which developed into an eight-day-long battle. Tabaruzaka was held by some 15,000 samurai from Satsuma, Kumamoto and Hitoyoshi against the Imperial Army's 9th Infantry Brigade (some 9,000 men). At the height of the battle, Saigō wrote a private letter to Prince Arisugawa, restating his reasons for going to Tokyo. His letter indicated that he was not committed to rebellion and sought a peaceful settlement. The government, however, refused to negotiate.

In order to cut Saigō off from his base, an imperial force with three warships, 500 policemen, and several companies of infantry landed in Kagoshima on 8 March, seized arsenals, and took Satsuma's governor into custody.

Yamagata also landed a detachment with two infantry brigades and 1,200 policemen behind the rebel lines, so as to fall on them from the rear from Yatsushiro Bay. Imperial forces landed with few losses, then pushed north seizing the city of Miyanohara on 19 March. After receiving reinforcements, the imperial force, now totaling 4,000 men, attacked the rear elements of the Satsuma army and drove them back.

Tabaruzaka was one of the most intense campaigns of the war. Imperial forces emerged victorious, but with heavy casualties on both sides. Each side had suffered more than 4,000 killed or wounded.

=== Retreat from Kumamoto ===
After his failure to take Kumamoto, Saigō led his followers on a seven-day march to Hitoyoshi. Morale was extremely low, and lacking any strategy, the Satsuma forces dug in to wait for the next Imperial Army offensive. However, the Imperial Army was likewise depleted, and fighting was suspended for several weeks to permit reinforcement. When the offensive was resumed, Saigo retreated to Miyazaki, leaving behind numerous pockets of samurai in the hills to conduct guerrilla attacks.

On 24 July, the Imperial Army forced Saigō out of Miyakonojō, followed by Nobeoka. Troops were landed at Ōita and Saiki north of Saigō's army, and Saigō was caught in a pincer attack. However, the Satsuma army was able to cut its way free from encirclement. By 17 August, the Satsuma army had been reduced to 3000 combatants, and had lost most of its modern firearms and all of its artillery.

The surviving rebels made a stand on the slopes of Mount Enodake, and were soon surrounded. Determined not to let the rebels escape again, Yamagata sent in a large force which outnumbered the Satsuma army 7:1. Most of Saigō's remaining forces either surrendered or committed seppuku. However, Saigō burned his private papers and army uniform on 19 August, and slipped away towards Kagoshima with his remaining able-bodied men. Despite Yamagata's efforts over the next several days, Saigō and his remaining 500 men reached Kagoshima on September 1 and seized Shiroyama, overlooking the city.

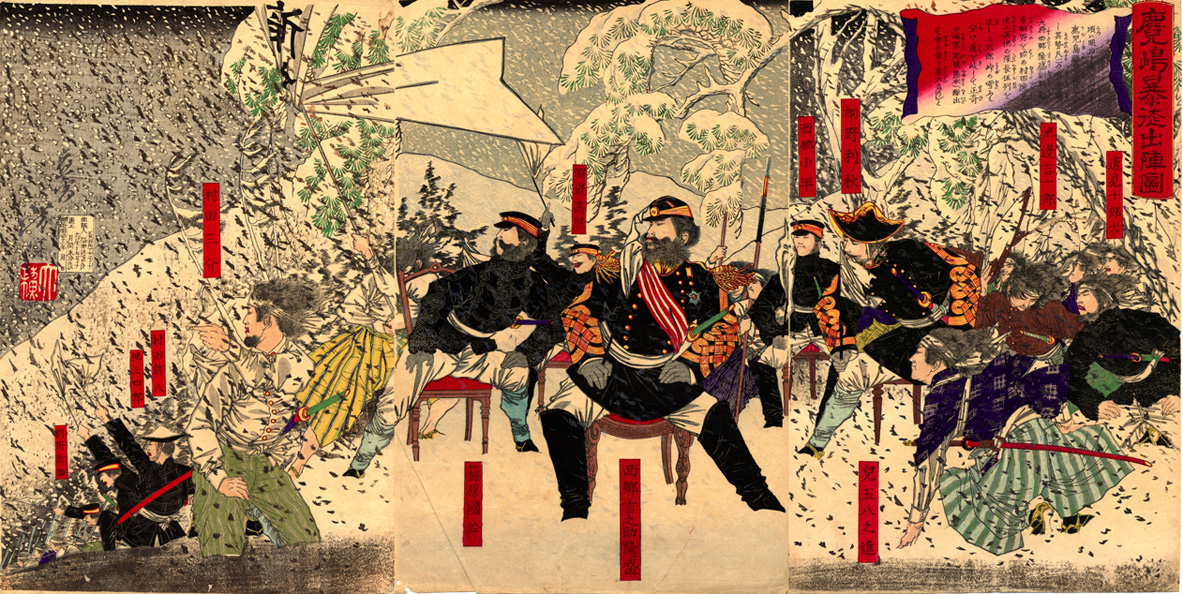
Kagoshima boto shutsujinzu by Yoshitoshi

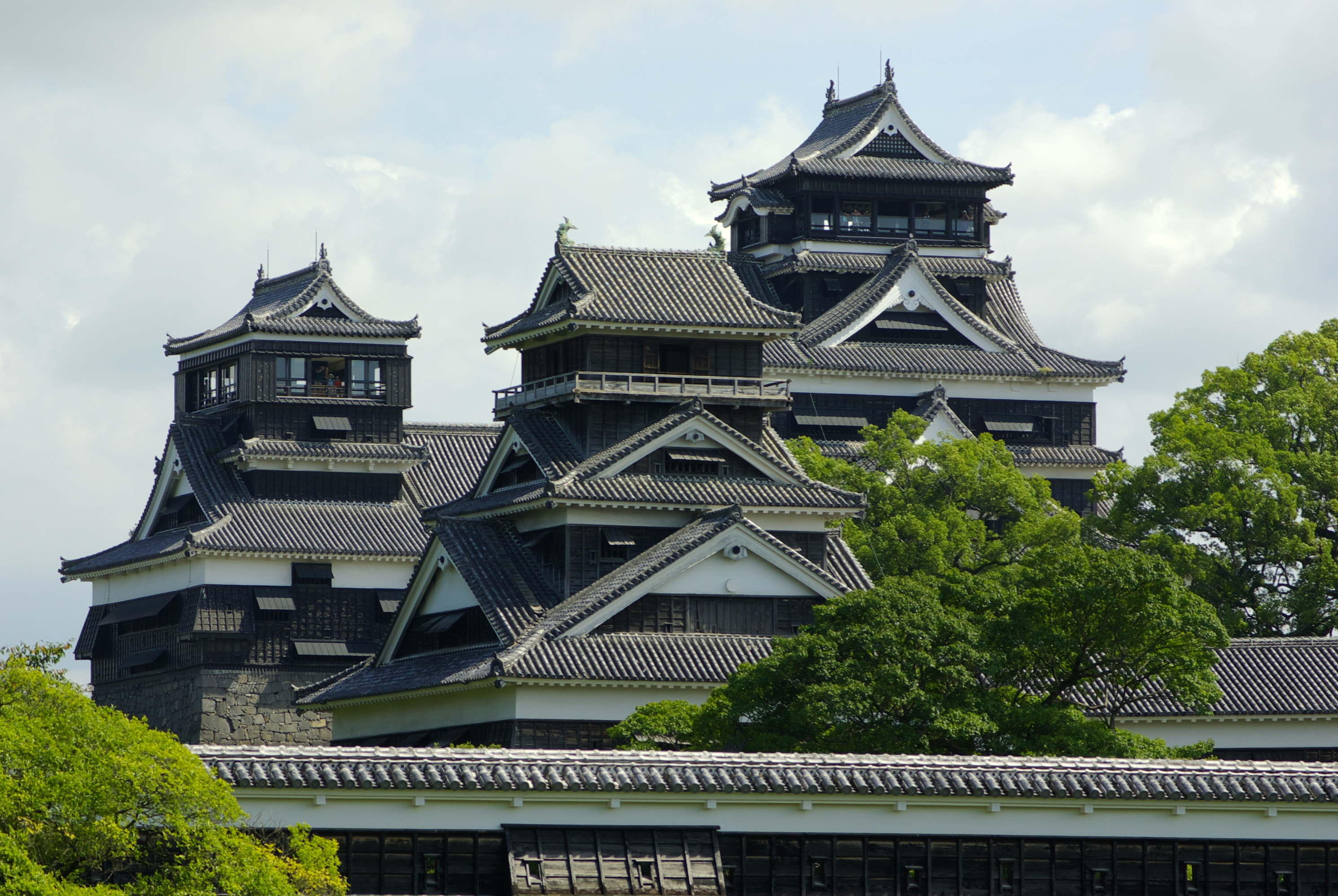
Kumamoto Castle

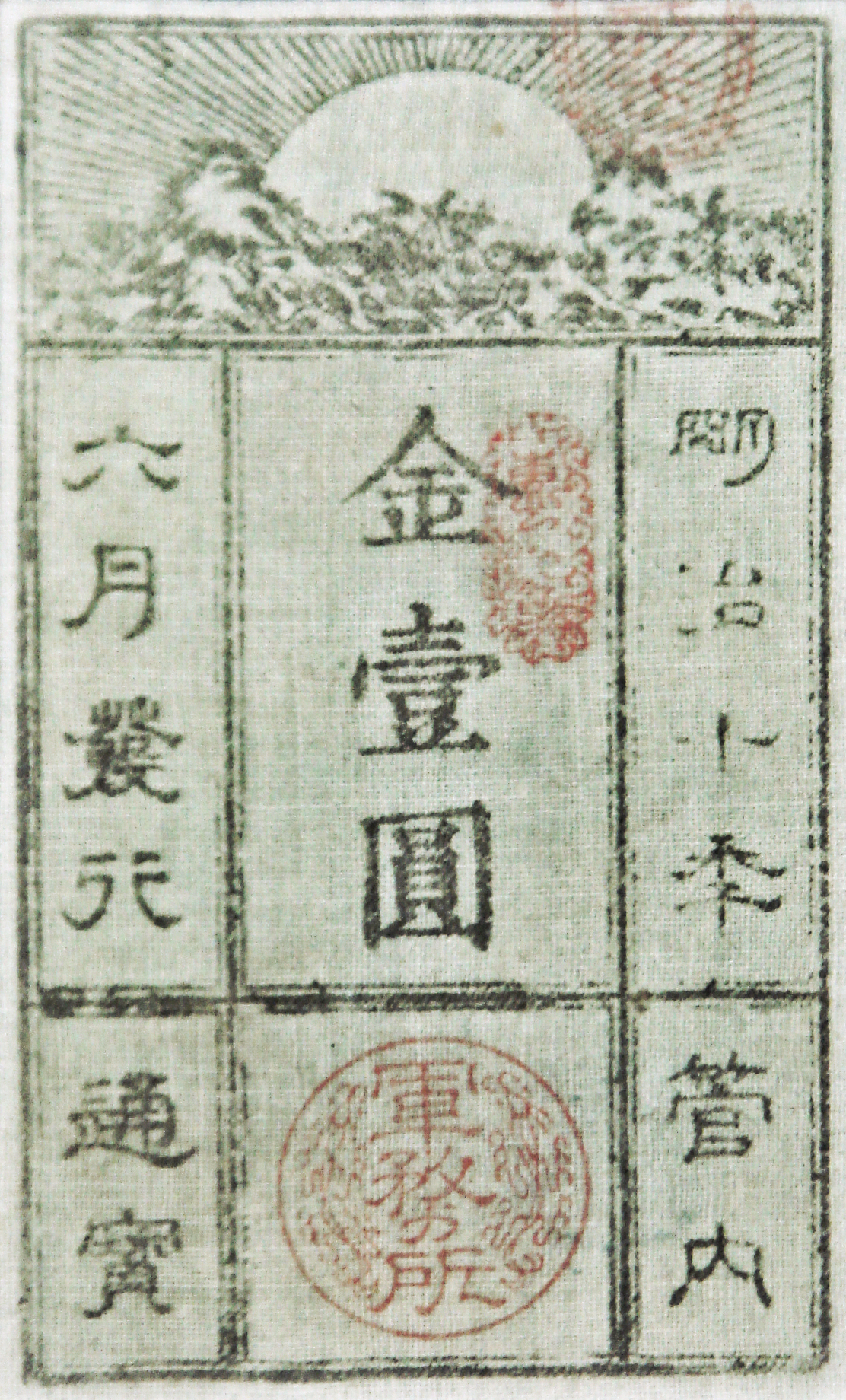
Saigō Takamori Gunmusho (軍務所) banknote, issued in 1877 to finance his war effort. Japan Currency Museum.

Battle of Tabaruzaka: Imperial troops on the left, rebel samurai troops on the right

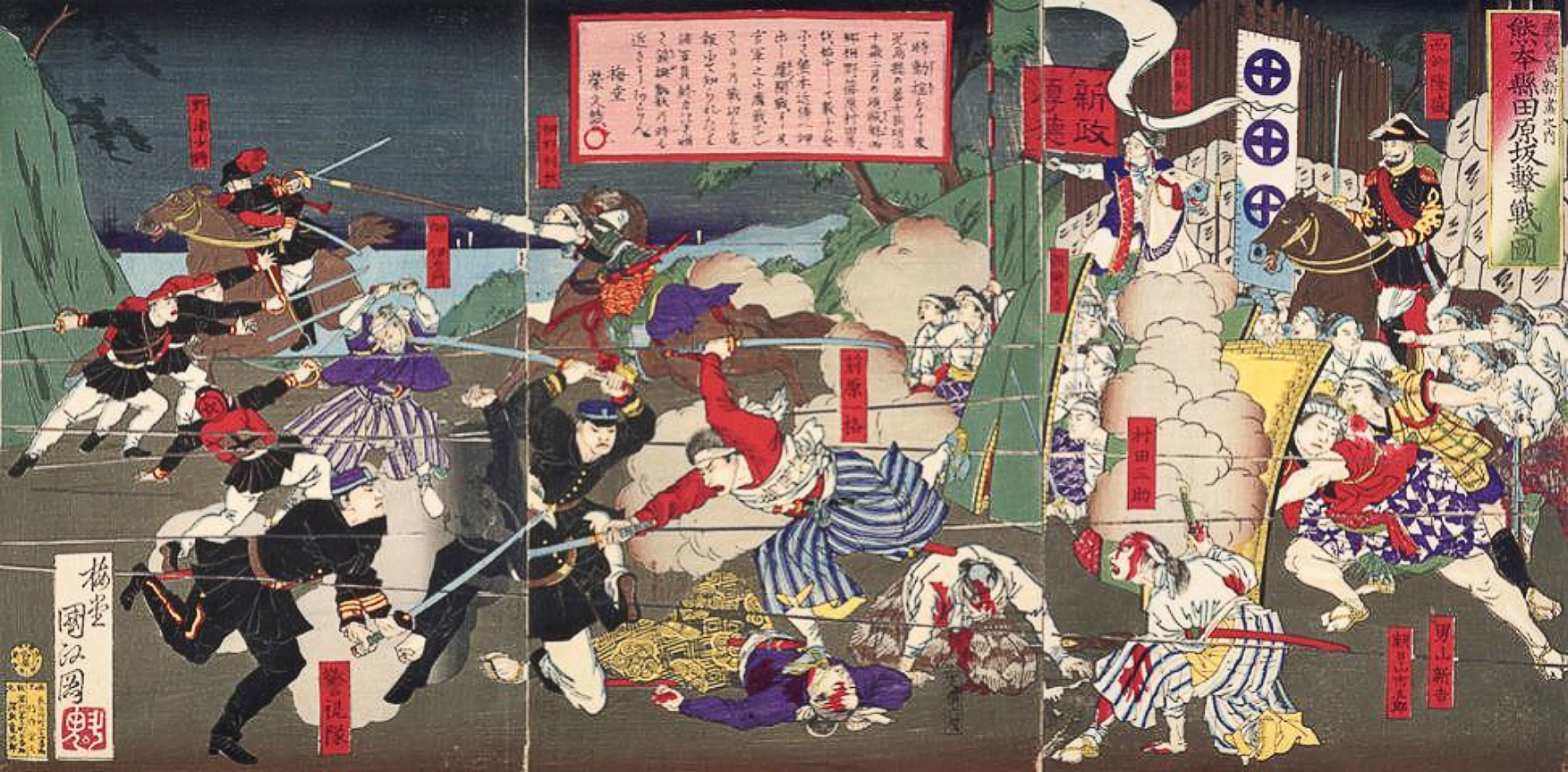
Battle of Tabaruzaka

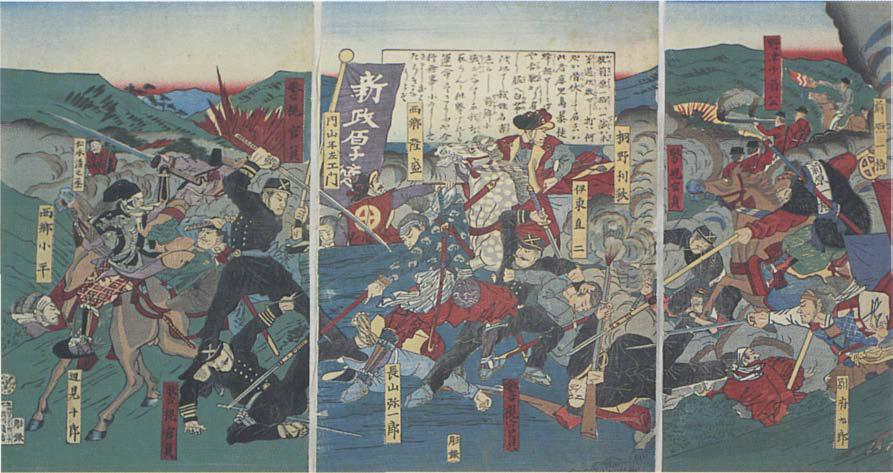
Saigo's army clashes with the government's forces

=== Battle of Shiroyama ===
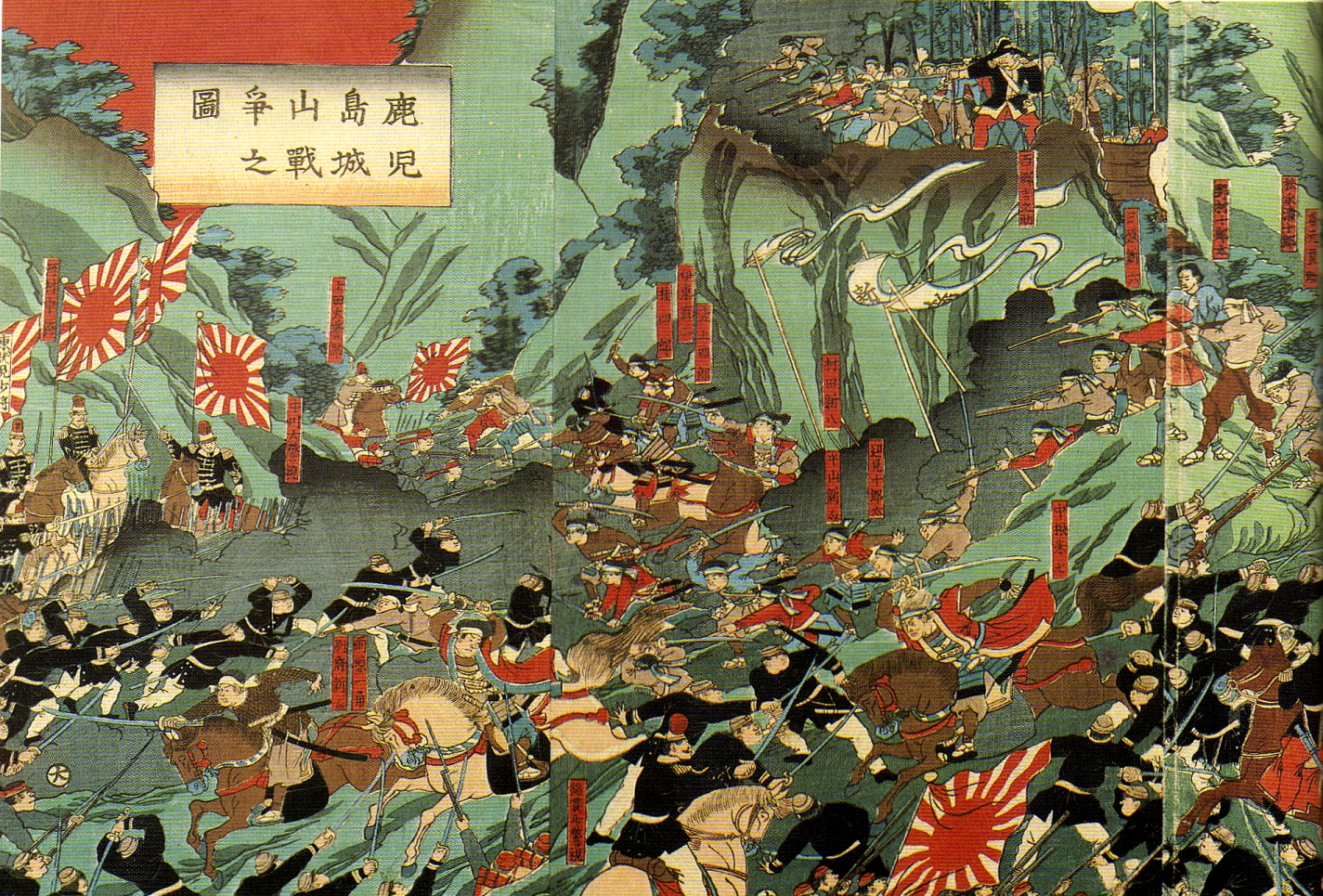
Battle of Shiroyama

Saigō and his remaining samurai were pushed back to Kagoshima where, in a final battle, the Battle of Shiroyama, Imperial Army troops under the command of General Yamagata Aritomo and marines under the command of Admiral Kawamura Sumiyoshi outnumbered Saigō 60-to-1. However, Yamagata was determined to leave nothing to chance. The imperial troops spent several days constructing an elaborate system of ditches, walls and obstacles to prevent another breakout. The five government warships in Kagoshima harbor added their firepower to Yamagata's artillery, and began to systematically reduce the rebel positions.

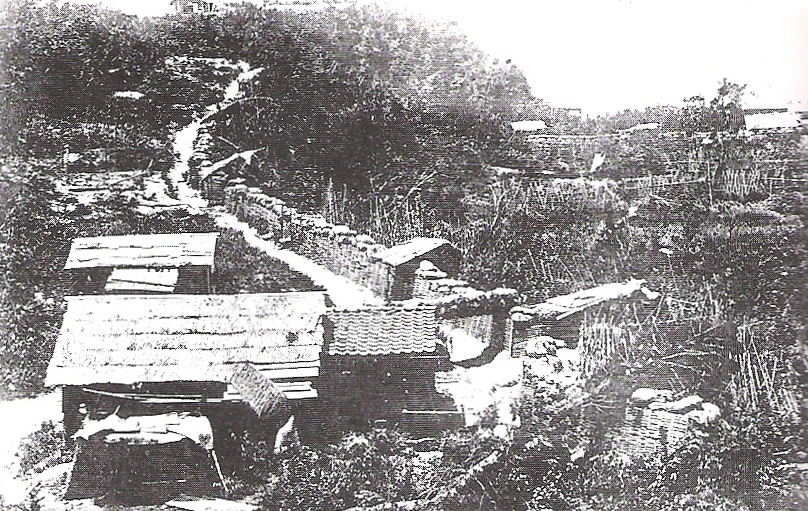
Imperial Japanese Army fortifications encircling Shiroyama. 1877 photograph.

After Saigō rejected a letter dated September 1 from Yamagata drafted by a young Suematsu Kenchō asking him to surrender, Yamagata ordered a full frontal assault on 24 September 1877. By 6 a.m., only 40 rebels were still alive. During the fighting, Saigō was severely wounded in the hip and abdomen by a bullet. According to the most widely accepted accounts and legends, Saigō, unable to proceed, committed seppuku. He turned to his close associate Beppu Shinsuke and said, "Shinsuke, I think this place will do. Please be my second (kaishakunin)." Saigō then calmly faced east towards the Imperial Palace, bent his head, and Beppu severed his head with a single sword stroke. Saigō's autopsy, however, revealed no wounds to his abdomen consistent with seppuku, suggesting he was likely too crippled by his gunshot wounds to perform the ritual and was beheaded by Beppu to prevent capture or a less honorable death.

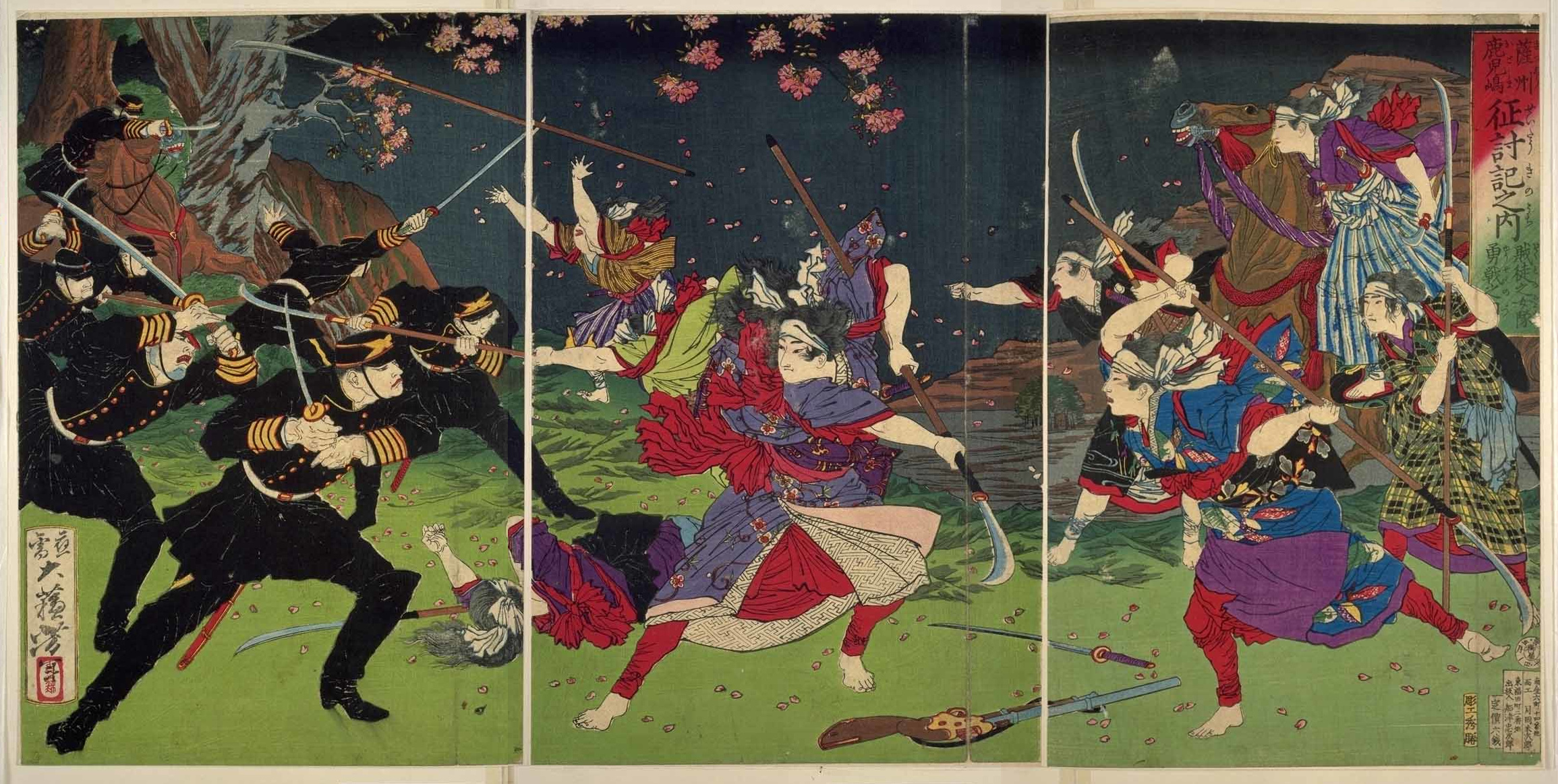
Samurai fighting the Imperial army during the Subjugation of Kagoshima in Sasshu (Satsuma), by Yoshitoshi, 1877

After Saigo's death, Beppu and the last of the "ex-samurai" drew their swords and plunged downhill toward the Imperial positions and to their deaths. With these deaths, the Satsuma rebellion came to an end.

== Aftermath ==
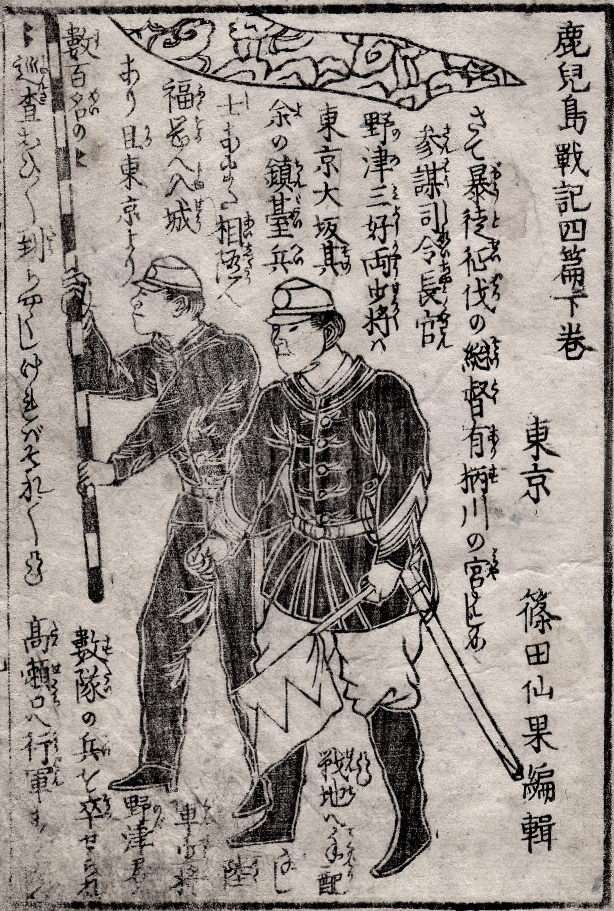
Soldiers of the Imperial Japanese Army during the Satsuma Rebellion

Financially, crushing the Satsuma Rebellion cost the government a total of ¥420,000,000 (£8,400,000), forcing Japan off the gold standard and causing the government to print paper currency. Economic effects of the Satsuma Rebellion resulted in the passing of the Act of 4 February 1877, which reduced the land tax from 3% to 2.5%. The Rebellion reduced Japan's yearly expenditure from £13,700,000 to £10,250,000, and it raised Japan's national debt from £28,000,000 to £70,000,000. The costs of pacifying the former samurai led to the Meiji government becoming virtually bankrupt; the government was forced to sell off state-owned enterprises such as factories and mines to politically-connected merchants and former officials at low prices, leading to the instant formation of large industrial firms or zaibatsu. These state-owned industries had been operating at a loss, and Finance Minister Matsukata Masayoshi decided to sell all of these to politically connected capitalists at a loss, except the railroad, telegraph and military industries. He also cancelled scholarships for Japanese students abroad and fired foreign experts. Meanwhile, the remnants of the militaristic faction that supported Saigo's invasion proposal evolved into Japanese right-wing groups such as the genyosha and kokuryūkai.

The rebellion also effectively ended the samurai class, as the new Imperial Japanese Army built on heimin conscripts had proven itself in battle. More critically, the defeat of the samurai displayed the power of modern artillery and rifles, against which a banzai charge had no appreciable effect. On 22 February 1889, Emperor Meiji pardoned Saigō posthumously. Statues in Ueno Park, Tokyo and near the ruins of Kagoshima Castle stand in his memory. Saigō Takamori was labelled as a tragic hero by the people, and his actions were considered an honorable example of bushido and Yamato-damashii.

== Name ==
In English, the most common name for the war is "Satsuma Rebellion". Mark Ravina, the author of The Last Samurai: The Life and Battles of Saigo Takamori, argued that "Satsuma Rebellion" is not the best name for the war because the English name does not well represent the war and its Japanese name. Ravina said that the war's scope was much farther than Satsuma, and he characterizes the event as being closer to a civil war than a rebellion. Ravina prefers the English name "War of the Southwest".

== In popular culture ==
Western interpretations include the 2003 American film The Last Samurai directed by Edward Zwick, which combines into a single narrative historical situations belonging to the Boshin War, the Satsuma Rebellion, and other similar uprisings of ex-samurai during the early Meiji period.

The song "Shiroyama" on the album The Last Stand by the Swedish power metal band Sabaton is about the Satsuma rebellion.

== General and cited references ==
- Henry Mounsey, Augustus (1879). The Satsuma Rebellion: An Episode of Modern Japanese History. J. Murray.
- Beasley, W. G. (1972). The Meiji restoration. Stanford, Calif: Stanford University Press. ISBN 978-0-8047-0815-9.
- Buck, James H. (1973). "The Satsuma Rebellion of 1877. From Kagoshima Through the Siege of Kumamoto Castle". Monumenta Nipponica. 28 (4): 427–446. doi:10.2307/2383560. JSTOR 2383560.
- Shiba, Gorō; Ishimitsu, Mahito; Craig, Teruko; Shiba, Gorō (1999). Remembering Aizu: the testament of Shiba Gorō (Nachdr. ed.). Honolulu: University of Hawaiʻi Press. ISBN 978-0-8248-2157-9.
- Drea, Edward J. (1998). In the service of the Emperor: essays on the Imperial Japanese Army. Studies in war, society, and the military. Lincoln: University of Nebraska Press. ISBN 978-0-8032-1708-9.
- Gordon, Andrew (2003). A modern history of Japan: from Tokugawa times to the present. New York: Oxford University Press. ISBN 978-0-19-511061-6.
- Henshall, Kenneth G. (2001). A history of Japan: from stone age to superpower. New York: New York : St. Martin's Press. ISBN 978-0-312-23370-9.
- Jansen, Marius B. (2000). The making of modern Japan. Cambridge (Mass.): the Belknap press of Harvard university press. ISBN 978-0-674-00334-7.
- Keene, Donald (2005). Emperor of Japan: Meiji and his world, 1852-1912. New York Chichester: Columbia University Press. ISBN 978-0-231-12341-9.
- Perrin, Noel (1979). Giving up the gun: Japan's reversion to the sword, 1543-1879. Boston: Boston : D.R. Godine. ISBN 978-0-87923-278-8.
- Ravina, Mark (2004). The last samurai: the life and battles of Saigō Takamori. Hoboken, N.J: John Wiley & Sons, Inc. ISBN 978-0-471-08970-4.
- Sims, Richard L. (2001). Japanese political history since the Meiji renovation, 1868-2000. New York: Palgrave. ISBN 978-0-312-23914-5.
