= Sword hunt =

Historic seizure of swords and weapons from Japanese civilians

Several times in Japanese history, the new ruler sought to ensure his position by calling a sword hunt (刀狩, katanagari). Armies would scour the entire country, confiscating the weapons (Note: By 1553, there were more firearms per capita in Japan than in any other country. Since they required much less training than bows, they were essential to the unification of Japan under Toyotomi Hideyoshi and Tokugawa Ieyasu. For the same reasons as the sword hunts, later shoguns discouraged the production of guns.) of all potential enemies of the new regime. In this manner, the new ruler sought to ensure that no one could take the country by force as he had just done. The most famous sword hunt was ordered by lord Toyotomi Hideyoshi in 1588.

== Sword hunts in the Sengoku period ==
Most men wore swords from the Heian period until the Sengoku period in Japan. Oda Nobunaga sought an end to this practice, and ordered the seizure of swords and a variety of other weapons from civilians, in particular the Ikkō-ikki peasant-monk leagues which sought to overthrow samurai rule.

In 1588, Toyotomi Hideyoshi, having become kampaku or "imperial regent", ordered a new sword hunt; Hideyoshi, like his predecessor Oda, sought to solidify separations in the class structure, denying commoners weapons while allowing them to the nobility, the samurai class. In addition, Toyotomi's sword hunt, like Oda's, was intended to prevent peasant uprisings and to deny weapons to his adversaries. This hunt may have been inspired by a peasant uprising in Higo Province the year prior, but also served to disarm the sōhei of Mount Kōya and Tōnomine. Toyotomi mandated that the confiscated weapons would be melted down and used to create the nails and clamps for the Hall of the Great Buddha at the Hōkōji temple in Kyoto.

"Taikō's Sword Hunt", as it came to be called, was accompanied by a number of other edicts, including the Expulsion Edict of 1590, by which Toyotomi sought to establish a census and expel from villages any newcomers who arrived in or after 1590. The chief goal of this was to place a check on the threat posed by rōnin, masterless wandering samurai who had the potential not only for crime and violence in general, but for banding together to overthrow Toyotomi rule. Hideyoshi, like most of this period, believed in rule by edict, paying little or no attention to legal principles.

== Sword control in Edo period ==
The Tokugawa shogunate did not confiscate swords from farmers and townspeople, who could continue to wear daisho until 1683. Many would keep wearing wakizashi on a daily basis after then. After the middle of the 18th century, they were still worn during special events such as travel, weddings, and funerals. This lasted until the Meiji Restoration.

Also, peasants were not prohibited from owning weapons. For example, during the Bunsei era (1818–1830 CE), the Shogunate investigated the weapons owned by farmers in the Kantō region. As a result, many weapons such as yari spears, long swords, swords, and naga-wakizashi were confirmed. However, the shogunate did not confiscate these weapons, only ordering the peasants not to go out with them and to report them if they were lost.

== Sword ban in the Meiji Restoration ==
The Meiji Restoration of the 1860s was the beginning of a period of major modernization and Westernization. In 1871, extensive reforms were passed and executed, abolishing the han system and thus ending feudalism and the class system.

In 1876, samurai were banned from carrying daishō. Peasants and townspeople were banned from carrying wakizashi. A standing army was created, as was a police force. This "sword hunt" only prohibited civilians from wearing swords and going out, not the possession of weapons.

== Sword hunt after World War 2 ==
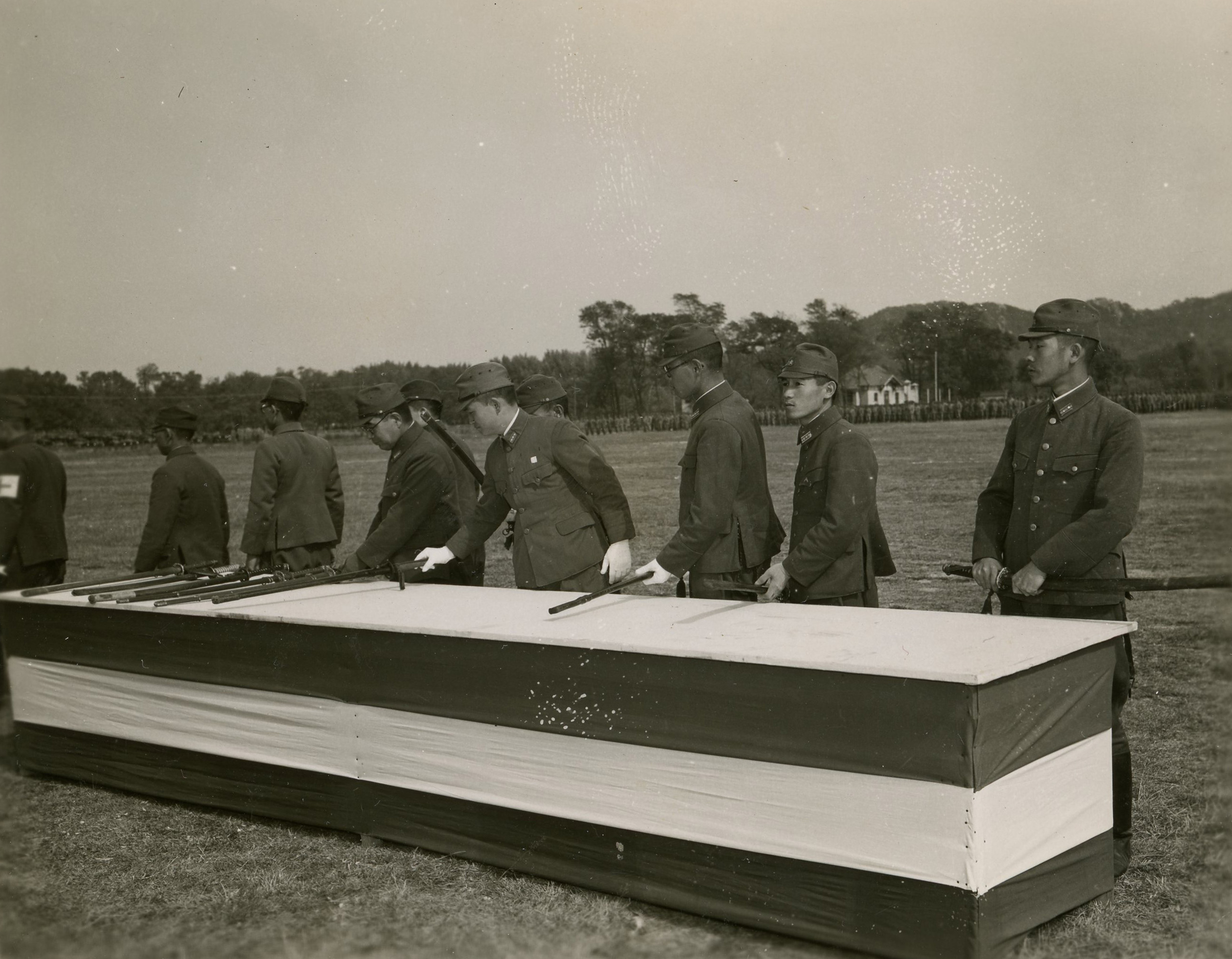
Japanese renounce their swords in 1945 in Qingdao, China

In 1946, Japanese civilians were made to forfeit their swords by Supreme Commander for the Allied Powers. The number of swords forfeited was over three million. This is the first time that Japanese peasants were disarmed completely.

Today, Japan has a Sword and Firearms Law which, much like gun control laws around the world, governs the possession and use of weapons in public. The purchase and ownership of certain swords within Japan is legal if they are properly registered, though the import and export of such items is tightly controlled, particularly in the case of items that might be labeled as national or cultural artifacts. Swords that are not produced by licensed smiths (including all machine-made swords) are prohibited for individuals. Japanese military swords are legal in Japan if they were made with traditional materials and methods, as swords produced by such methods are not seen only as weapons but also as works of art. Swords produced by mass production methods are seen solely as weapons and are thus illegal.
