= Political parties of the Empire of Japan =

Between the Meiji Restoration and 1940

Political parties (政党, seitō) appeared in Japan after the Meiji Restoration, and gradually increased in importance after the promulgation of the Meiji Constitution and the creation of the Diet of Japan. During the Taishō period, parliamentary democracy based on party politics temporarily succeeded in Japan, but in the 1930s the political parties were eclipsed by the military, and were dissolved in the 1940s during World War II.

== Early movements ==
Soon after the Meiji Restoration, various political associations arose. These included groups of disgruntled unemployed samurai seeking either to overthrow the government and return to the days of feudalism, or to invade Korea (see Seikanron), whereby their skills as warriors would be in demand again. These also included urban intellectuals and rural landowners who were part of the liberal Freedom and People's Rights Movement seeking a national assembly and written national constitution.

Both groups were viewed with equal suspicion and disdain by the Meiji oligarchy, who reacted by imposing several repressive laws on public assembly, the press and on political discussion. The Meiji government had come to power by an elite of samurai from certain clans (hambatsu) and the genrō felt threatened by anything looking even remotely like republicanism or democracy.

During this period, Itagaki Taisuke and Ōkuma Shigenobu were leading figures in the legitimization of political parties. Itagaki created Japan's first political party, the Aikoku Kōtō, in 1873 in Tokyo to petition for an elected assembly, and a similar regional party based in Osaka, the Aikokusha. These groups were the basis of the Jiyutō (Liberal Party), founded in 1881 as Japan’s first nationally based party. Ōkuma founded the Rikken Kaishintō in 1882, mainly from the urban elites. In reaction, the oligarchs fought back by the creation of their own party the same year, the Rikken Teiseitō.

Meanwhile, the disgruntled former samurai vented their dissatisfaction at the state of affairs in a series of revolts, including the Saga Rebellion of 1872, and others, cumulating in the Satsuma Rebellion. After crushing these revolts by military force, the government also passed the Peace Preservation Law of 1887. The Meiji Constitution was issued two years later in 1889.

== Domination by the oligarchs ==
The creation of the Diet of Japan in November 1890 was marked by intense rivalry between the genrō, who reserved the right to appoint the Prime Minister and the members of the cabinets regardless of what the elected government wanted, and the political parties who were powerless because of their inability to unite and thus control the House of Representatives. The Rikken Kaishintō gradually lost support, and was overtaken by the pro-oligarch until it was reformed as the Shimpotō in 1896.

None of the political parties, whether pro- or anti-oligarch, had any power in the House of Peers, nor did they have significant power in the countryside, as key local officials were appointed directly by the bureaucracy in Tokyo.

== Emergence of party government ==
The Jiyutō and the Shimpotō united in 1898 against Prime Minister Itō Hirobumi's proposed new taxation plans, and formed the Kenseitō, which emerged with a majority of seats in Diet in the subsequent election. Itō resigned, and was replaced by Ōkuma Shigenobu, making the first time that a political party had assumed power. Although the Ōkuma government collapsed within months, a precedent had been set.

The Kenseitō evolved into the Kenseitō Hontō, followed by the Rikken Kokumintō in 1910. Itō Hirobumi joined into the fray, by organizing the Rikken Seiyukai in 1900 to combine elements from the former Jiyutō with elements from the oligarchs and bureaucrats. The more conservative elements rallied around Katsura Taro, and his Rikken Doshikai, which was reconstituted as the Kenseikai in 1916. From 1922 onwards, politics was a rivalry between the Seiyukai and the Kenseikai, rather than political parties and oligarchs.

During this period, a bewildering array of parties advocating socialism, Marxism or agrarianism appeared. All provoked hostility from the mainstream political parties, oligarchs and military alike, and many were either banned or went underground soon after formation. Following the successful Bolshevik Revolution in Russia and the emergence of labor unions in Japan, the Nihon Shakai Shugi Dōmei (1920), Japan Communist Party (1922), and other left-wing parties emerged.

== Ascendancy of the military ==
The main threat to representative democracy in Japan proved to be the Japanese military, rather than the left-wing parties. Under the Meiji Constitution, the Minister of the Army (who served as Minister of War) and Minister of the Navy were appointed by their respective services, and not by the Prime Minister. The military was also directly answerable only to the Emperor, and not to the elected government. In 1912, a law restricting the eligibility to Minister of the Army or Navy to active duty generals or admirals had the unforeseen effect of giving the military a trump card over the government when Prime Minister Uehara Yusaku resigned over failure of the Diet to pass his budget requesting funds for two additional army divisions. The Army's refusal to appoint a successor brought down the government.

== Taishō democracy ==
The military did not immediately utilize its prerogative to control the formation of the Cabinet, so in the Taishō period, several administrations from 1918–1922 and 1924–1932 operated largely free from military intervention. In 1927, the Kenseikai reorganized itself as the Rikken Minseitō, which from 1927 to 1932 alternated power with the Seiyukai. Prime Ministers continued to be chosen by genrō Saionji Kinmochi (Itō Hirobumi’s protégé), but his choices during his period reflected political party strength in the Diet.The pseudo two-party system during this period is called "Established practices in constitutional politics (憲政の常道, Kensei no Jōdō)". These included the premiership of Hara Takashi, Takahashi Korekiyo, Kiyoura Keigo, Katō Takaaki, Wakatsuki Reijirō, Tanaka Giichi, Hamaguchi Osachi, and Inukai Tsuyoshi.

== Shōwa military rule ==
The number of voters increased fourfold after the passage of the Universal Manhood Suffrage Law in 1925, which gave all men 25 years and over the right to vote. With the increase in expenses required for election, the influence of the zaibatsu on the political parties also increased. At the beginning of the Shōwa era, this collusion between politicians and government officials, led to an increase in high-profile corruption scandals and increasing dissatisfaction with the elected government by the public in general and by the military in particular. Some military used this dissatisfaction to denounce the London Naval Treaty and promote a Shōwa Restoration.

The assassination of Prime Minister Inukai Tsuyoshi in the May 15 Incident (1932) at the hands of young Navy radicals proclaiming the need for political reform, started the rapid decline in the power and influence of the political party in Japan. After the assassination of Inukai, every subsequent Prime Minister was either from the military, or was someone with militaristic and/or ultranationalistic credentials. As the military influence on society increased towards the end of the 1930s, the Imperial General Headquarters launched a large scale invasion of China. Pressure then mounted from the military leadership for the remaining political parties to merge into a single organization, thus giving the government a single voice, referred to as Hakkō ichiu ("eight crown cords, one roof"). This change to a one-party state was effected in 1940 under Prime Minister Fumimaro Konoe, when all remaining political parties joined the Imperial Rule Assistance Association.

== Timeline ==
- 1874: Aikoku Kōtō (Public Society of Patriots) founded
- 1881: Aikoku Kōtō and Aikokusha are continued by the Jiyūtō (Liberal Party of Japan)
- 1882: Rikken Kaishintō (Constitutional Progressive Party) founded by Okuma Shigenobu
- 1882: Rikken Teiseitō founded by conservatives
- 1887: Peace Preservation Law
- 1889: Meiji Constitution
- 1890: Opening of the Diet of Japan
- 1890: Rikken Jiyūtō established
- 1891: Rikken Jiyūtō renamed Jiyūtō
- 1896: Rikken Kaishintō is continued by the Shimpotō (Progressive Party)
- 1898: Rikken Jiyūtō and Shimpotō merge to form the Kenseitō (Constitutional Politics Party)
- 1900: Kenseitō is taken over by the oligarchy and renamed the Constitutional Friends Association (Rikken Seiyūkai)
- 1900: Public Order & Police Law of 1900
- 1910: A faction of the former Kenseitō forms the Rikken Kokumintō (Constitutional National Party)
- 1912: Start of the Taishō period
- 1913: A faction of the Rikken Kokumintō forms the Rikken Dōshikai (Constitutional Friendship Association)
- 1916: Rikken Dōshikai becomes the Kenseikai (Constitutional Association)
- 1920: Foundation of the Nihon Shakai Shugi Dōmei
- 1922: Foundation of the Japan Communist Party
- 1922: Rikken Kokumintō merges into Kakushin Club (Reform Club), which later merges with the Rikken Seiyūkai
- 1925: Peace Preservation Law of 1925
- 1925: Universal Manhood Suffrage Law of 1925
- 1926: Start of the Shōwa period
- 1926: Foundation of the Nihon Rōnōtō (Japan Labor-Farmer Party), Rōdō Nōmintō (Labor-Farmer Party), and the Shakai Minshutō (Socialist People's Party)
- 1927: Rikken Minseitō formed from the Kenseikai
- 1928 March 15 incident
- 1929: April 16 incident
- 1930: Prime Minister Hamaguchi assassinated
- 1931: March Incident and Imperial Colors Incident
- 1932: May 15 Incident; Prime Minister Inukai assassinated
- 1933: Fascist Kokumin Dōmei formed
- 1936: February 26 Incident: Prime Minister Okada Keisuke escapes assassination
- 1936: Fascist Tōhōkai formed
- 1937: Popular Front Incident
- 1940: Imperial Rule Assistance Association formed

== Alphabetical listing of pre-war political parties ==
This is a partial listing of political parties in pre–World War II Empire of Japan

- Aikoku Kōtō: 1874–1874, founded by Itagaki Taisuke
- Aikokusha: 1875 & 1878–1891, founded by Itagaki Taisuke
- Jiyutō Party: organized by Itagaki Taisuke & Goto Shojiro
- Kenseikai: 1916–1925, founded by Kato Takaaki
- Kenseitō: 1889–1910, founded by Ōkuma Shigenobu & Itagaki Taisuke
- Kokumin Dōmei: 1932–1940, founded by Nakano Seigō
- Japan Communist Party: 1922–1925 (to 1935 underground), founded by Yamakawa Hitoshi & Fukumoto Kazuo
- Nihon Musantō: 1937–1937, founded by Suzuki Mosaburō
- Nihon Ronōtō: 1926–1928
- Rikken Dōshikai: 1913–1916, founded by Katsura Tarō
- Rikken Minseitō: 1927–1940, founded by Hamaguchi Osachi
- Rikken Kaishintō: 1882–1896, founded by Ōkuma Shigenobu
- Rikken Seiyukai: 1900–1940, founded by Itō Hirobumi
- Rikken Teiseitō: 1882–1883, founded by Fukuchi Gen'ichirō
- Rōdō Nōmintō: 1926–1928
- Social Democratic Party: 1926–1932, founded by Abe Isoo
- Shakai Taishūtō: 1932–1940, founded by Abe Isoo
- Shimpotō: 1886–1889, founded by Ōkuma Shigenobu
- Tōhōkai: 1936–1940, founded by Nakano Seigō

Note that this list does not include the ultranationalist organizations, which (although they had a political agenda) did not participate directly in the electoral process by running their own candidates for public office. Likewise, this list does not include the political factions within the Japanese military, which also were not true political parties.
