= Ueki Emori =

Japanese politician

- 植木 枝盛
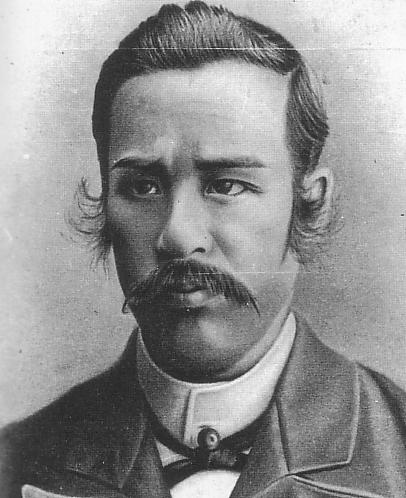

Member of the House of Representatives
- In office 2 July 1890 – 25 December 1891
- Preceded by: Constituency established
- Succeeded by: Nishiyama Yukizumi
- Constituency: Kōchi 3rd

Personal details
- Born: 14 February 1857 Tosa, Kōchi, Japan
- Died: 23 January 1892 (aged 34) Tokyo, Japan
- Resting place: Aoyama Cemetery
- Party: Liberal (1890–1892)
- Other political affiliations: Aikoku Kōtō (1874–1875); Jiyūtō (1881–1884)
- Education: Chidōkan

Ueki Emori (植木 枝盛; February 14, 1857 – January 23, 1892) was a Japanese revolutionary democrat active in the Freedom and People's Rights Movement and one of the founders of the Risshi-sha, which was a political party and joined the League for the Establishment of a National Assembly.

Ueki was the son of a middle-ranking samurai from Tosa. Inspired by Itagaki Taisuke, he became involved in the Jiyūtō. In 1875, he was thrown in jail under the Newspaper Act for writing an article critical of the government. Upon release he wrote an article "Freedom is worth purchasing with one's own blood". In 1881 he wrote A Private Draft of the Japanese Constitution, which gave provision for the overthrow of oppressive government.

In 1882 Ueki visited Fukushima in August and September at the invitation of the Fukushima Jiyūtō branch to help set up the local party newspaper Fukushima Jiyū Shimbun, before returning to Tokyo to replace Baba Tatsui on the central party newspaper Jiyū Shimbun.

In 1892, just before the second general election for the House of Representatives, he died due to a worsening stomach ulcer. He is buried in Aoyama Cemetery, in Tokyo.
