= Osaka Conference of 1875 =

Political conference in Osaka, Japan

The Osaka Conference of 1875 (大阪会議, Ōsaka Kaigi) was a meeting held by the major leaders of the Meiji Restoration in Osaka, Japan from January to February 1875 to address the issue of forming a representative assembly.

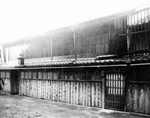
Location of the Osaka Conference of 1875

The leaders present included Okubo Toshimichi, Kido Takayoshi, Itagaki Taisuke, Ito Hirobumi, and Inoue Kaoru. In 1873, Itagaki had withdrawn from the government over the Seikanron issue, and was now loudly agitating for representative democracy as the leader of the Freedom and People's Rights Movement. Likewise, in 1874, Kido had withdrawn from the government due to his opposition to the Taiwan Expedition of 1874.

The remaining Meiji oligarchs called for a meeting in Osaka in early 1873 in an attempt to reconcile differences and to persuade Itagaki and Kido to return to the government. As concessions, it was agreed that a Senate (Genrōin) would be established, along with an Assembly of Prefectural Governors. A new Supreme Court, called the Great Court of Cassation (Daishin-in) would also be established to separate the judiciary from the legislative branches of government.

The decisions reached at the Osaka Conference were officially sanctioned by an Imperial Proclamation in April 1875.

Although on the surface, the oligarchs appeared to be creating a form of representative assembly, the Genrōin and the Assembly of Prefectural Governors were appointive rather than elective, and were dominated by conservative bureaucrats, and in the same year, the first of the Peace Preservation Laws were enacted to suppress the liberal movement.

== See also ==
- Meiji government
- Meiji oligarchy
