= Fukushima disaster =

Fukushima disaster may refer to:

- 2011 Tōhoku earthquake and tsunami, which caused extensive damage to the eastern coast of Fukushima Prefecture
- Fukushima nuclear accident, in which the Fukushima Daiichi Nuclear Power Plant was heavily damaged by the 2011 Tōhoku earthquake and tsunami
- Fukushima incident (1882), political tumult in Fukushima Prefecture
