= Soejima Taneomi =

Japanese diplomat and politician (1828–1905)

Senior Second Rank Count Soejima Taneomi
- 副島 種臣
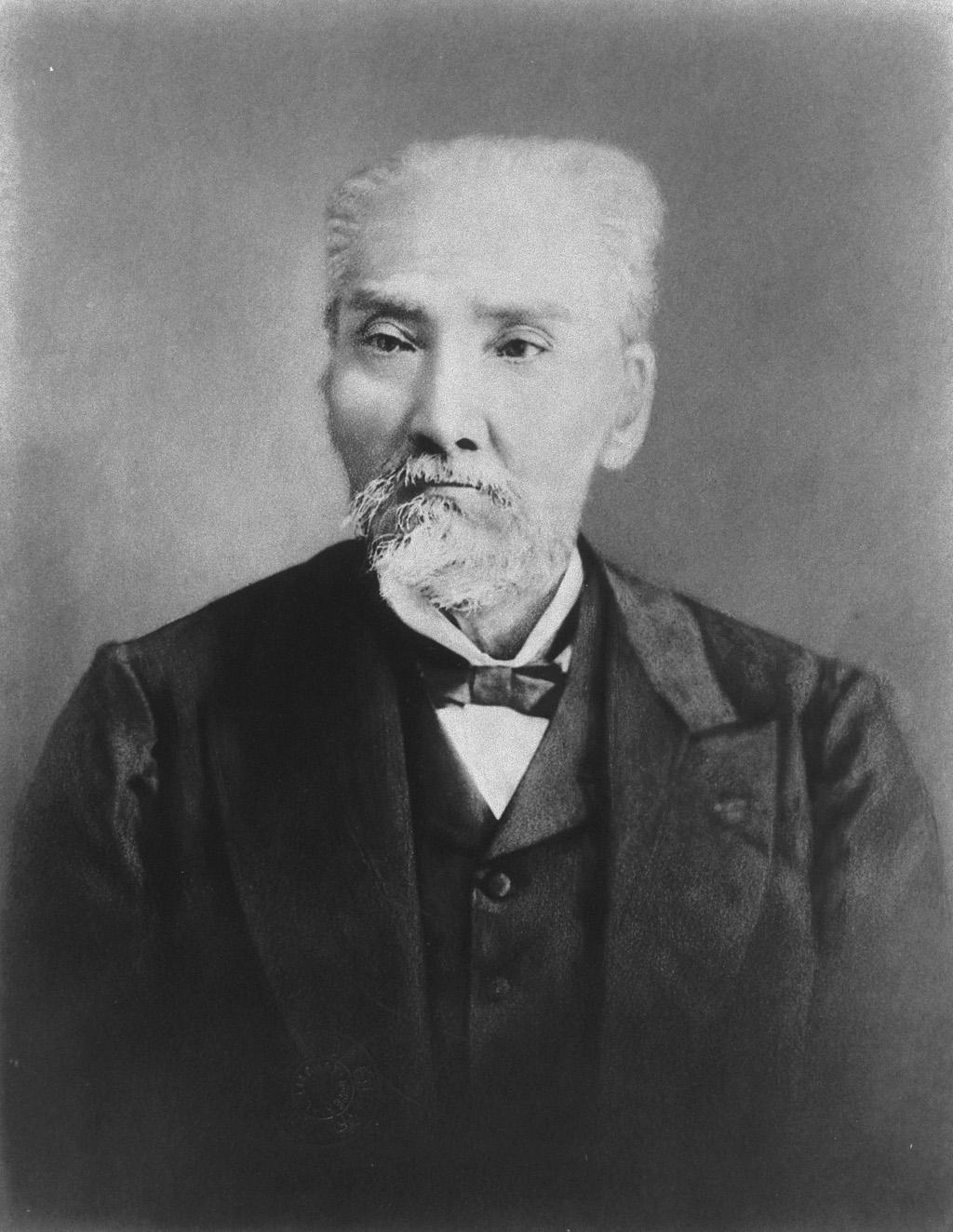

Minister of Home Affairs
- In office 11 March 1892 – 8 June 1892
- Prime Minister: Matsukata Masayoshi
- Preceded by: Shinagawa Yajirō
- Succeeded by: Matsukata Masayoshi

Vice President of the Privy Council
- In office 10 September 1891 – 11 March 1892
- Monarch: Meiji
- President: Itō Hirobumi
- Preceded by: Terashima Munenori
- Succeeded by: Higashikuze Michitomi

Minister for Foreign Affairs
- In office 15 December 1871 – 28 October 1873
- Monarch: Meiji
- Preceded by: Iwakura Tomomi
- Succeeded by: Terashima Munenori

Member of the Privy Council
- In office 8 June 1892 – 31 January 1905
- Monarch: Meiji
- In office 30 April 1888 – 10 September 1891
- Monarch: Meiji

Personal details
- Born: 17 October 1828 Saga, Hizen, Japan
- Died: 31 January 1905 (aged 76) Tokyo, Japan
- Party: Aikoku Koto
- Relatives: Shima Yoshitake (cousin)

Military service
- Allegiance: Saga Domain
- Battles/wars: Boshin War

Count Soejima Taneomi (副島 種臣; 17 October 1828 – 31 January 1905) was a Japanese diplomat and politician active during the early Meiji period.

== Life and career ==
Soejima was born into a samurai family in Saga, in Hizen Province (present-day Saga Prefecture). His father was a teacher in the domain's school and a scholar of National Learning (kokugaku). In 1866, Soejima was sent to Nagasaki by the domain leaders to study the English language. There he studied under Guido Verbeck, a Dutch missionary, giving special attention to the United States Constitution and the New Testament. During the Boshin War he was a military leader of the Saga forces committed to the overthrow of the Tokugawa shogunate.

After the Meiji Restoration, Soejima became a junior councilor (san'yo) and assisted Fukuoka Takachika in drafting the structure of the provisional Meiji government in 1868. While most of Japan's government was on its around-the-world tour of the United States and Europe on the Iwakura Mission, Soejima served as interim Foreign Minister. During his term he was faced with the difficult issue of the Maria Luz Incident, involving the questions of extraterritoriality and the unequal treaties in a case involving the mistreatment of Chinese indentured laborers on a Peruvian ship. Soejima was praised by the Chinese government over his handling of the affair.

In 1871, he was sent to Siberia to adjust boundary questions relating to the island of Sakhalin. In 1873, Soejima led a mission to Beijing to protest the murder of 54 crewmembers of a wrecked Ryūkyūan merchant vessel by Paiwan aborigines on the southwestern tip of Taiwan in December 1871. (The former Ryūkyū Kingdom had only been formally claimed by the Empire of Japan, as Japanese sovereign territory from September 1872.) Soejima succeeded in meeting with the Tongzhi Emperor partly on the basis of the goodwill extended over the Maria Luz Incident, but Japan's demands for compensation were refused, leading to the Taiwan Expedition of 1874. However, the mission to China did succeed in establishing formal diplomatic relations between Japan and China.

After the return of the Iwakura Mission and the rejection of the Seikanron proposals to invade Korea in October 1873, Soejima resigned from the government. He later joined Itagaki Taisuke and Eto Shimpei in forming the Aikoku Koto political party. On a visit to China in 1876, he was received with high honors by the mandarins by reason of his scholarship, and he became private adviser of the emperor.

Starting from around 1873, Soejima became one of the best disciples of Honda Chikaatsu, a spiritualist known for devising chinkon kishin. In the 1883 text Shintō montai (真道問対), Soejima asks a series of 114 questions about the nature of the universe, soul, etc. in a Socratic-style dialogue with his master Honda. A similar text is Questions and answers at Sōkai’s window (滄海窓問答, Sōkaisō mondō) compiled in 1898 by Sasaki Tetsutarō (佐佐木哲太朗), which contains 98 questions and answers on Soejima's understanding of Honda's spiritual studies. The title of the text is derived from Soejima's nickname Sōkai (蒼海).

Soejima returned to government service in 1878, serving in the Imperial Household Agency. In 1888 he was appointed to the Privy Council, and became its vice chairman in 1891. In 1892, he was called upon to become Home Minister in the First Matsukata Cabinet.

== Notes ==
Political offices
Preceded by Shinagawa Yajirō	Home Minister; March 1892 – June 1892	Succeeded by Matsukata Masayoshi
