= Morikazu =

- Gender: Male

Origin
- Origin: Japanese
- Meaning: Different meanings depending on the kanji used

Morikazu (written: 盛和 or 守一) is a masculine Japanese given name. Notable people with the name include:

- Numa Morikazu (沼間 守一) (1843–1890), Japanese politician and journalist
- Morikazu Toda (戸田 盛和) (1917–2010), Japanese physicist
