= Omeisha =

Defunct political association in Japan

The Omeisha (嚶鳴社, Ōmeisha, literally the “Singing Birds Society”) was a political association of the early Meiji Period that was founded in 1878 by Morikazu Numa, who was grand secretary at the Genroin. It strongly advocated democratic rights and the establishment of a national parliament. It established its head office in Tokyo and set up branches all over the country, including in Kantō and Tōhoku, reaching at its height a membership of more than 1000 people.

== History ==
Morikazu Numa, who had accompanied Japanese commissioners on their foreign trips in 1872, had observed the vigorous free speech enjoyed in the Western world and in 1873, with Togama Kono and his associates, he established the Horitsu Koshukai, or Institute of Jurisprudence, which was the predecessor organization of the Omeisha, at the home of the director of Shitaya Marishiten Temple in Tokyo. This organization was active in organizing speaking tours and debates.

At first the Horitsu Koshukai didn’t attract audiences of more than 10 people, but because Numa persevered attendance increased. In July 1875 Numa became grand secretary at the Genroin on the recommendation of Togama Kono and because he accepted legal inquiries, many scholars were among his colleagues. Among those, Saburo Shimada, Kozo Tanaka, and Seiichi Koike, and others joined his movement.

In 1878, after the Satsuma Rebellion, Horitsu Koshukai changed its name to Omeisha, moved its meeting place to the Manpachi Restaurant in Yanagibashi, Tokyo, and met there every Sunday. They decided that they would in part research law and politics and also deliver speeches and stories to gathered citizens. Saburo Shimada, Sukeyuki Kawazu, Ryu Koizuka, Tokiyoshi Kusama, Ukichi Taguchi, Kentaro Kaneko, and Teccho Suehiro participated in these activities. Kaneko and Suehiro, with others, drew up the Omeisha’s Kenpo Soan, a prominent example of the many popularly written draft constitutions that were circulated prior to the promulgation of the Meiji Constitution in 1890.

One in three Omeisha members were working as civil servants and so when public speaking by people employed in the Japanese government was prohibited in May 1879, Omeisha members launched Omeisha Magazine in October, which continued for about three and a half years, and put out their official newspaper, Yokohama Mainichi Shimbun, in November. On the one hand they encouraged members of their audiences to join the Omeisha and, on the other hand, members who were employed with the government henceforth explained to the citizenry that they were unable to meet them and instead would publish the notes of their lectures in Omeisha Magazine. Membership soon rose to several hundred and Omeisha also created branches for people outside Tokyo who applied to join.

Even within the organization, opinions differed over the structure of Japan’s proposed parliament and electoral system. Numa and his associates joined the League for the Establishment of a National Assembly in 1880, and though they showed willingness of participate in the formation of the Liberal Party, in 1882 they joined the Rikken Kaishintō with Shigenobu Okuma who had been forced to leave public office during the Political Crisis of 1881.

In July 1882 the government of Japan ordered Omeisha to dissolve as part of repressive amendments to the Public Assembly Ordinance.

== See also ==
- Freedom and People's Rights Movement
