= Aikokusha =

Society of Patriots
- Leader: Itagaki Taisuke
- Founded: February 1875
- Dissolved: 1880
- Ideology: Liberalism; Constitutionalism

The Aikokusha (愛国社; "Society of Patriots") was a political party in the early Meiji-period Japan from 1875 to 1880.

The Aikokusha was formed in February 1875 by Itagaki Taisuke, as part a liberal political federation to associate his Risshisha with the Freedom and People's Rights Movement. It was disbanded the same year, when Ōkubo Toshimichi promised Itagaki that the government would draft a constitution.

When no constitution had appeared by September 1878, Itagaki revived the Aikokusha and renamed it the League for the Establishment of a National Assembly. Its primary purpose was to petition the government to establish a national assembly. It was renamed Liberal Party, which Itagaki founded in October 1881.

The Aikokusha should not be confused with the Aikoku Kōtō, or with various later ultranationalist movements with similar names.

== See also ==
- List of liberal parties
- Liberal democracy
- Liberalism in Japan
