= Tatsui =

Tatsui may refer to:

- Tatsui village (龍井庄), village in Taichū Prefecture during Japanese rule
- Baba Tatsui (1850–1888), Japanese legislative reformer
- Matsunosuke Tatsui (龍居松之助, 1884‍–‍1961)
- Yukari Tatsui, Japanese writer
- Longjing District (龍井區), the name of which was changed to Tatsui during Japanese rule
