= Numa Morikazu =

Japanese politician and journalist

- 沼間 守一
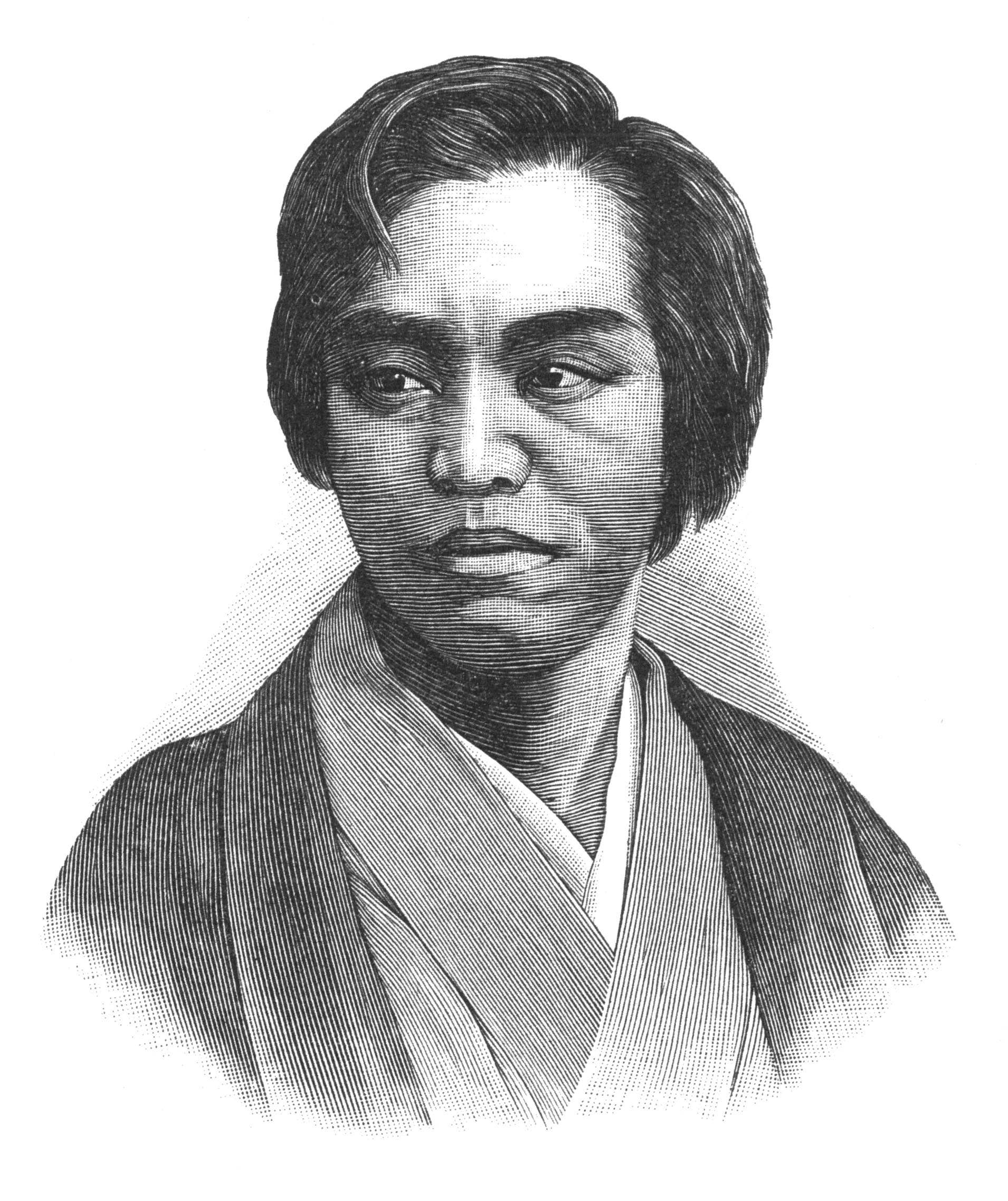
- Born: 2 December 1843; Edo, Musashi, Japan
- Died: 17 May 1890 (aged 46); Tokyo, Japan
- Occupations: Tokugawa Army officer, English teacher, Journalist
- Political party: Rikken Kaishintō

Numa Morikazu (沼間 守一; 2 December 1843 – 17 May 1890) was a politician and journalist in Meiji period Japan.

== Biography ==
Born to a samurai family in Edo in 1843, Numa was involved in scholarship at an early age. He learned English from James Curtis Hepburn in Yokohama, and was later sent to study western military science at Nagasaki. He translated a text on English-style infantry warfare in 1866 and, in 1867, he was commissioned as a hohei-gashira nami (歩兵頭並; roughly equivalent to a lieutenant) in the Shogunate's elite Denshūtai unit. Numa fought on the Tokugawa side in the Boshin War.

Following the Meiji Restoration, after a brief period in prison, he was released due to a favor he had once done for Itagaki Taisuke, and was hired by the new Meiji government as an infantry warfare instructor for the Tosa Domain. He also taught English in Tōkyō. Among his students were Takamine Hideo and Shiba Shirō, the sons of former Aizu samurai who would later become famous in academia.

Numa entered the Finance Ministry in 1872, and later worked for the Justice Ministry, and elsewhere within the government. In 1873, together with Kōno Togama, he founded Horitsu Koshukai (the predecessor of Omeisha). Following peasant unrest, Numa was sent to investigate the situation in Sakata Prefecture late in 1875.

Dissatisfied with government policies restricting freedom of speech, he retired from the Genrōin in 1879 and decided to devote his energies to the Freedom and People's Rights Movement. He purchased a newspaper, the Yokohama Mainichi Shinbun. Reorganizing it into the Tōkyō-Yokohama Mainichi Shinbun, he used it as a mouthpiece for the liberal ideas he always supported, and used it to call for the establishment of a national assembly. In 1881, he prepared the foundation of Liberal Party with Itagaki Taisuke but joined the Rikken Kaishintō with Ōkuma Shigenobu following year. At the same time, from 1882 until his death, he was head of the Tokyo Prefectural Assembly.

Numa died of pneumonia in 1890, at the age of 46.

== See also ==
- Omeisha
