= League for the Establishment of a National Assembly =

Japanese political organization

The League for the Establishment of a National Assembly (国会期成同盟, Kokkai Kisei Dōmei), later called the Great Japan Public Association of Volunteers for the Establishment of a National Assembly (大日本国会期成有志公会), was a Japanese political organization that played a central role during the Meiji period in the movement to establish a National Diet; it was also the forerunner of the Liberal Party.

== Background ==
In 1875 Taisuke Itagaki formed the Aikokusha, in order to expand his Freedom and People's Rights Movement nationwide. However, because Itagaki was reinstated as a sangi in the Meiji government his Aikokusha soon dissolved on its own.

Three years later, in September 1878 the Aikokusha was revived and a conference was held. At its third conference held in November 1879 it was decided to engage in canvassing throughout Japan and collect signatures for a petition to establish a national assembly.

== Formation of the League ==
The fourth conference of the Aikokusha was held at Osaka's Kitafuku Pavilion on 15 March 1880. 114 people from 24 prefectures participated, including representatives from political associations unaffiliated with the Aikokusha, and about 87,000 signatures were collected together petitioning for the establishment of a national assembly. Kenkichi Kataoka was selected to chair the meeting with Yukizumi Nishiyama as co-chair. On March 17, they moved their meeting hall to Taiyu Temple and continued proceedings until 9 April.

At the conference it was decided to found the League for the Establishment of a National Assembly for enlarging and developing the organization. Thus, the fourth conference of the Aikokusha was rebranded as the first conference of the League for the Establishment of a National Assembly. A 19-point agreement was drawn up according to which the League resolved to set up a standing committee for the purpose of maintaining contact between the political associations of each region, to present their petition to the Emperor, to hold another conference in November of the same year in the event that the Emperor did not accept their petition, and to not disband the League until a national assembly had come into being.

The League chose Kenkichi Kataoka and Hironaka Kono to deliver the Petition Requesting the Establishment of a National Assembly. They proceeded to Tokyo and tried to submit it to both the Dajokan and the Genroin but the government refused to recognize their right to petition and turned it down. What's more, on 5 April the government enacted the Public Assembly Ordinance, a law restricting freedom of association and assembly, as a Dajokan Proclamation, and they clamped down on and repressed the Freedom and People's Rights Movement. However, the forces who had built up the liberal movement resisted the government's actions. The movement experienced as upsurge as citizens individually put forward petitions to the government.

== The second conference ==
The second conference of the League for the Establishment of a National Assembly was opened on 10 November 1880 in Tokyo at a former branch of the Aikokusha. 64 people participated, representing political associations from 24 prefectures in all parts of the country, and the signatures of about 13,000 people were collected together petitioning for the establishment of a national assembly.

At the conference Hironaka Kono was selected as chair, and then a "Victim Relief Act" was enacted providing for support to individuals and their families who had been subject to oppression due to their involvement in the campaign. Furthermore, a council book was approved resolving to change the League's name to the Great Japan Public Association of Volunteers for the Establishment of a National Assembly, to set up its headquarters in Nishikonya-cho, Tokyo, to have each political association write up and share a proposal for a draft constitution before the next conference, and to not disband the association until a national assembly had come into being. After the conference, a number of influential draft constitutions were prepared throughout the country including the Itsukaichi Kenpo and the Toyo Dai Nihonkoku Kokken An.

Though it wasn't voted on at the conference, a proposal was also put forward by Hironaka Kono, Masahisa Matsuda, and Emori Ueki to form a political party in order to lead the campaign. Following the end of the conference on 15 December 1880, Kono, Matsuda, and Ueki convened a meeting with Morikazu Numa and Tokiyoshi Kusama of the Omeisha and others, and founded the Liberal Party Preparation Committee with Numa as chairman.

== The third conference and the formation of the Liberal Party ==
The main agenda planned for the Association's third conference in October 1881 was discussion of the draft constitutions drawn up by their members. In addition, during the first two days of October talks were undertaken between the leaders of the Liberal Party Preparation Committee and the Great Japan Public Association of Volunteers for the Establishment of a National Assembly with an eye to bringing together the two organizations and forming a new political party. Kaneaki Hayashi of the Association's standing committee played a leading role in the negotiations.

While this was happening, the Hokkaido Colonization Assets Scandal had come to light and, as a result of having taken the government to task over it, Shigenobu Okuma was ousted from the government in the Political Crisis of 1881. In order to deflect mounting criticism, the government promulgated on 12 October 1881 the Imperial Edict on the Establishment of a National Assembly to take effect in the year 1890. The activists of the Freedom and People's Rights Movement, judging that they had succeeded in their objective, shelved their discussion of the draft constitutions and the majority agreed that they ought to create a political party.

Because differences of opinion would emerge between the group's urban and rural elements, Morikazu Numa seceded from the formation of the new party and would later join Shigenobu Okuma's Rikken Kaishinto.

On 18 October 1881 the conference opened, bringing together 78 representatives from across the country at the restaurant Ibumura-Ro in Tokyo. Shojiro Goto was selected to chair the meeting with Tatsui Baba as co-chair. On 19 October the party pledge and rules were written up and on 29 October the Liberal Party came into being with Taisuke Itagaki being elected as the party's president and Nobuyuki Nakajima as vice-president.
