= Terashima Munenori =

Japanese politician and diplomat (1832–1893)

Count Terashima Munenori
- 寺島 宗則
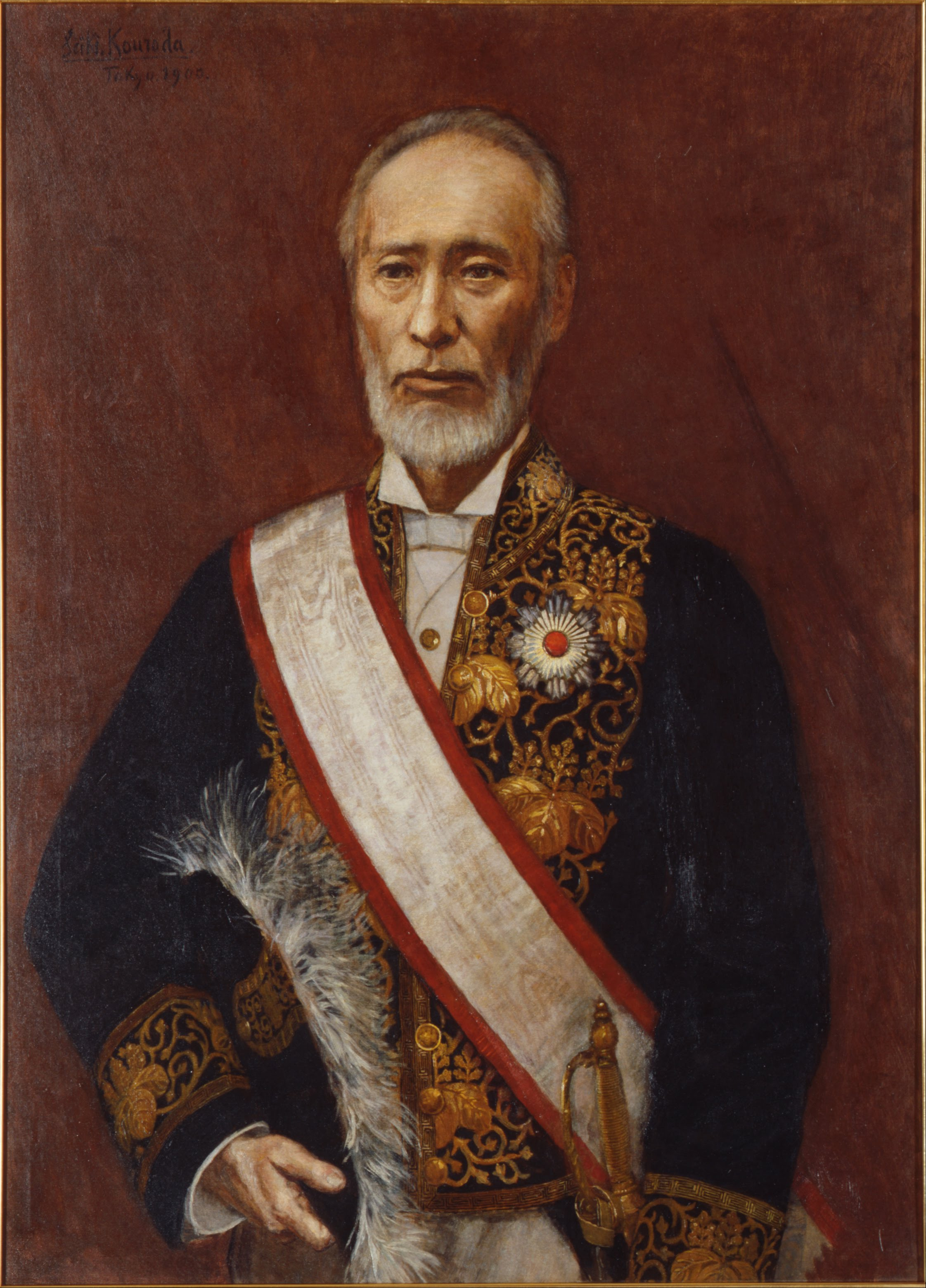
- Portrait of Count Terashima Munenori by Kuroda Seiki

Vice President of the Privy Council
- In office 10 May 1888 – 10 September 1891
- Monarch: Meiji
- President: Itō Hirobumi; Ōki Takatō; Itō Hirobumi
- Preceded by: Office established
- Succeeded by: Soejima Taneomi

Chairman of the Genrōin
- In office 21 October 1881 – 13 July 1882
- Monarch: Meiji
- Preceded by: Ōki Takatō
- Succeeded by: Sano Tsunetami

Minister of Education
- In office 10 September 1879 – 28 February 1880
- Chancellor: Sanjō Sanetomi
- Preceded by: Saigō Jūdō
- Succeeded by: Kōno Togama

Minister for Foreign Affairs
- In office 18 October 1873 – 10 September 1879
- Chancellor: Sanjō Sanetomi
- Preceded by: Soejima Taneomi
- Succeeded by: Inoue Kaoru

Member of the Privy Council
- In office 10 September 1891 – 7 June 1893
- Monarch: Meiji
- In office 30 April 1888 – 10 May 1888
- Monarch: Meiji

Governor of Kanagawa Prefecture
- In office 5 November 1868 – 28 May 1869
- Monarch: Meiji
- Preceded by: Higashikuze Michitomi
- Succeeded by: Moritome Iseki

Personal details
- Born: 21 June 1832 Akune, Satsuma, Japan
- Died: 21 June 1893 (aged 61)

Count Terashima Munenori (寺島 宗則; 21 June 1832 – 6 June 1893) was a Japanese politician and diplomat during the Meiji period. He served as President of the Chamber of Elders and Minister for Foreign Affairs.

== Early life ==
Terashima was born to a samurai family in Satsuma Domain (in what is now part of Akune, Kagoshima Prefecture). He studied rangaku and was appointed as a physician to Satsuma daimyō Shimazu Nariakira. In 1862, he was chosen as a member of the group of students selected by the Tokugawa bakufu to study at the University College London in Great Britain. He also visited France, the Netherlands, Belgium, Russia and Portugal. He returned to Japan in 1863, and participated in the defense of Satsuma during the Anglo-Satsuma War.

== Meiji bureaucrat ==
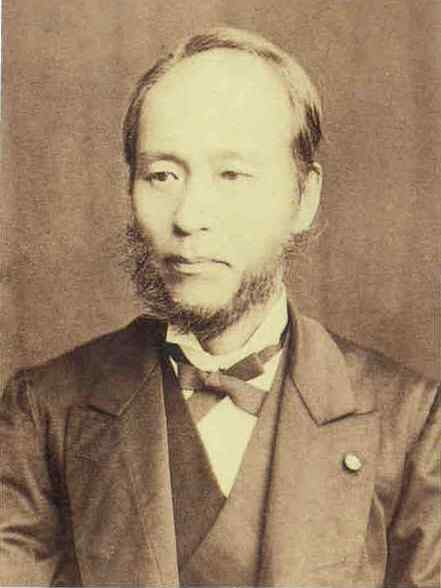
Count Terashima Munenori

After the Meiji Restoration, Terashima was appointed a san'yo (junior councilor) in the new Meiji government. In 1873, he was appointed foreign minister, and negotiated the Treaty of Saint Petersburg (1875), which fixed the national boundaries between Japan and the Russian Empire. His efforts to re-negotiate the unequal treaties with the United States failed at the last minute due to British opposition. Terashima was also responsible for the negotiations during the Maria Luz Incident involving a Peruvian ship carrying indentured labor Chinese laborers stopping in Japan.

As Governor of Kanagawa Prefecture, he was responsible for connecting Tokyo and Yokohama by telegraph in 1868.

He later served in the Genrōin (Chamber of Elders), and as the president of Genrōin between 1881 and 1882. He was minister to the United States from 1882 to 1884. In 1888, he became vice president of the Privy Council. He served in that position until 1891.

== See also ==
- Japanese students in the United Kingdom
