= Baba Tatsui =

Baba Tatsui 馬場辰猪
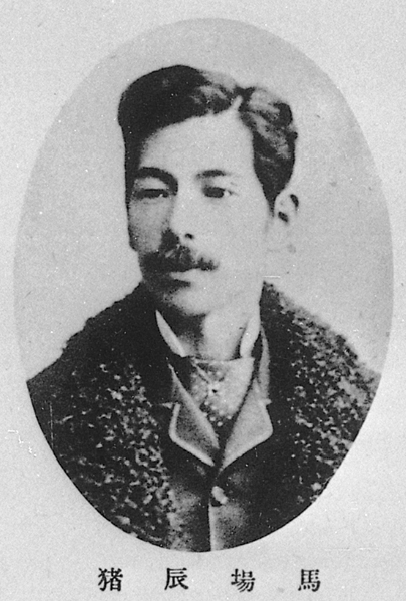
- Born: 24 July 1850; Kochi, Japan
- Died: 1 November 1888 (aged 38); Philadelphia, United States.
- Known for: Japanese Reform work
- Notable work: First Guide to Japanese Grammar (1873)

Baba Tatsui (馬場 辰猪, 24 June 1850 – 1 November 1888) was a Japanese legislative reformer during the Meiji period.

== Early life ==
Baba was born in Kochi in Japan to a samurai family. In 1864, he began local schooling, learning Chinese classics, fencing, and European military training. In 1865 he was chosen by his family to study in Edo as a marine engineer. Due to the quality of his course, he took to learning English books to further his studies with Fukuzawa Yukichi, author of Seiyō Jijō (西洋事情, "Things western").

== Britain ==
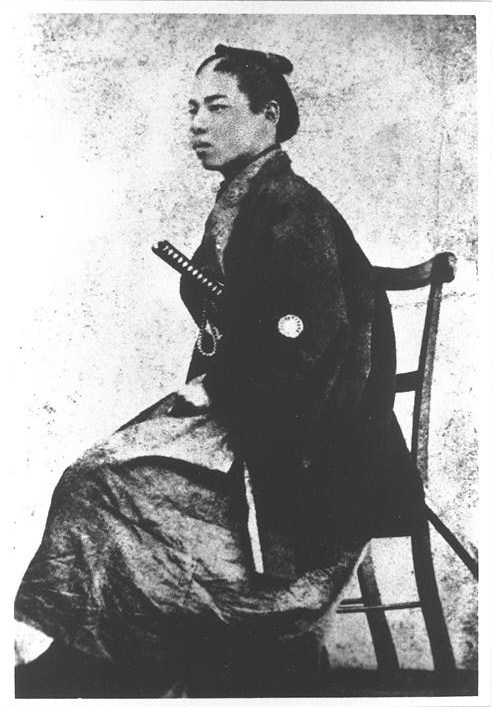
Baba in Wafuku

Baba moved to Britain in 1870, residing outside Chippenham with four other students from Tosa Domain (now Kōchi Prefecture). They then moved to Warminster where he studied Geography, Geometry and History at the local grammar school. Baba moved to London in October 1871 eventually settling in West Croydon. The following autumn Baba continued his studies in England in Naval Engineering until 1872 when he switched to law after the Iwakura Mission arrived in London, granting him a governmental grant, and began attending the "regular courses," and sat in on a Westminster case in the Court of Probate and the Queen's Bench. From February 1873 he attended the Association for the Promotion of Social Science, attending annual Congresses from November to June with his English friends like the society's General Secretary Charles Ryalls and Sheldon Amos in Norwich and Brighton in 1875 where they aimed to draft new laws to benefit the working classes of Victorian England. Topics discussed included legislative reform for prisoners, women's education, animal cruelty, trade union law and public sanitation.

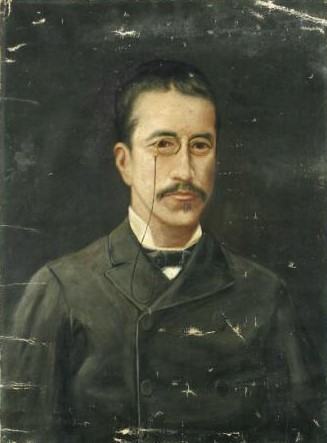
Iga Yotaro

Baba then shortly returned to Japan between 1874 and 1875, returning to England in 1875. At the 1875 summit, he supported fellow Japanese writer Hara Rokuro in the rolling back of the right to extraterritoriality which British citizens still enjoyed in Japan until 1899, with Baba joining the National Indian Association with Iga Yotaro on the advice of Elizabeth Adelaide Manning speaking against the issue of "The Opium Revenue of India"; afterwards visiting the social reformer Harriet Martineau. Here he formed a background knowledge of Roman Law, "rhetoric and journalism" with a focus on the capacity to follow and lead debate and legislative discussion. He was said to be most influenced by the intellectual liberalist writings of John Stuart Mill, Herbert Spencer whose work he began to translate into Japanese, Walter Bagehot, Alexander Bain and Henry Maine publishing two pamphlets in English—The English in Japan: What a Japanese Thought and Thinks about Them and The Treaty between Japan and England—between 1875 and 1876 on British merchants in Japan and liberal notions of equal statehood between the two which he sent to William Gladstone and Benjamin Disraeli. In January 1878, he injured his fellow student, Manabe Kaisaku.

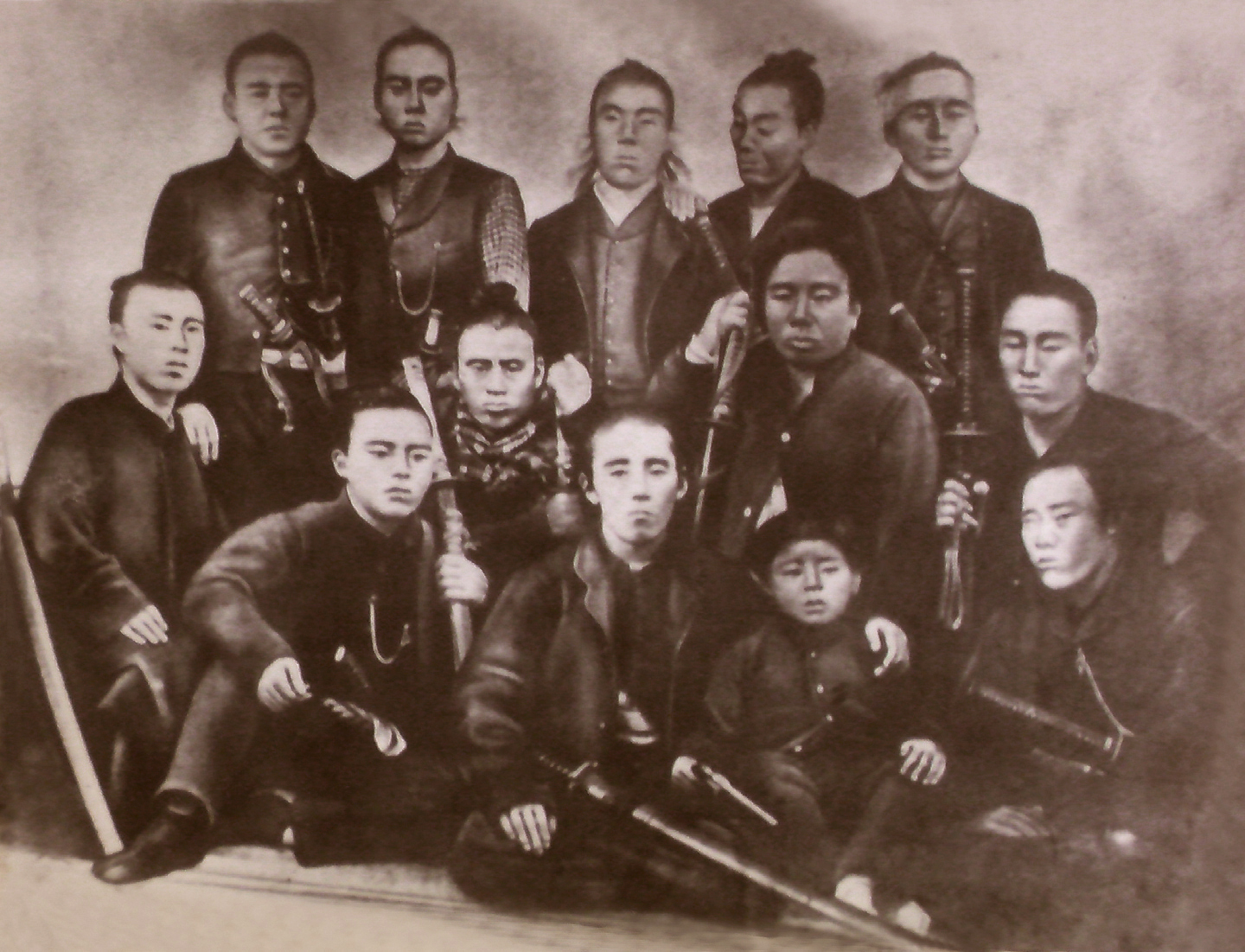
Jinshotai (Bottom row, from left: Ban Gondayu, Itagaki Taisuke, Tani Otoi (young boy), Yamaji Motoharu. Middle row, from left: Tani Shigeki (Sinbei), Tani Tateki (Moribe), Yamada Kiyokado (Heizaemon), Yoshimoto Sukekatsu (Heinosuke). Top row, from left: Kataoka Masumitsu (Kenkichi), Manabe Masayoshi (Kaisaku), Nishiyama Sakae, Kitamura Shigeyori (Chobei), Beppu Hikokuro.)

During his time in England he wrote a Japanese grammar entitled An Elementary Grammar of the Japanese Language with Easy Progressive Exercises (語文典初歩, Nihon bunten shoho), becoming heavily aware of the need for representative government and cultivating strong public opinion and how these developed nationhood, and became an active speaker based on contemporary Liberal political styles of addressing the courts. He founded the Society of Japanese Students in London (1873–1886) with Azusa Ono, which spoke on topics such as "the condition of women" in Japanese society, Heian literature and the jury system. Baba began advocating for the revision of the "Unequal Treaties" with the West in the text "The Treaty Between Japan and England and The English in Japan" which was reviewed and supported by the editor of the Aesthetic Review and Art Observer Madame Ronniger, in a section entitled "The Treaty between Japan and England." In his spare time he took to theatre-going, watching Henry Irving in Richard III, reading the novels of Benjamin Disraeli, Bulwer Lytton and Charles Dickens. He would frequently visit the Houses of Parliament to observe Disraeli and Gladstone, being most moved by the Eastern Question which he noted provided "every opportunity to observe the benefit of possessing the representative institution for the mass of the people." He led an active social life in London and took to listening to preachers on Sunday such as Charles Voysey and discussing intellectual dialogue such as theism and unitarianism with William Kingdon Clifford and Kenkichi Kataoka.

== Japan ==
When he returned to Japan, Baba became an activist in the movement that called for a democratic constitution based on scientific principle and some of the Spencerian liberalist western ideals of freedom and representative government to enable man to enjoy these freedoms, thus co-founded the Kokuyū-kai (国友会) and Kyosondoshu. In 1881 he became vice-president of the newly formed party Jiyūtō (自由党), where he befriended President Itagaki Taisuke and Gotō Shōjirō. Together with Nakae Chōmin he became one of the leading theorists of the day. In 1882, he was dismissed by Itagaki for having opposed his ban on trips abroad.

Baba wrote articles for the magazine Kyōson (共存雑誌) for Jiyū (自由新聞) and Chōya newspapers (朝野新聞). He founded the Meiji Gijuku (明治義塾) evening school and opened a law firm in Japan. In 1885 Baba was arrested on charges of possessing explosives bought from an English merchant in Yokohama together with Oishi Masami; most likely due to his exercising of free speech against the existing government; but was released after some six months. In 1886 he went into exile in the United States, where he wrote the long essay (in English in 1888):The Political Condition of Japan, Showing the Depotism and Incompetency of the Cabinet and the Aims of the Popular Parties later dying in Philadelphia that same year.
