= Fukushima incident (1882) =

The Fukushima incident was a political tumult which took place in Fukushima Prefecture in 1882.

The incident started with the appointment of Mishima Michitsune as governor. His rule was contested by two groups, one in Aizu and the other in the east of the prefecture, which remained separate until the end of 1882, when they were drawn together by their shared persecution.

== Fukushima Jiyūtō ==
The Liberal Party (Jiyūtō) developed a significant organisation in Fukushima. Two branches, one in Aizu and another in the east of the prefecture were established in December 1881, two months after the Party itself was established. They were the largest party in the Fukushima Assembly, holding 24 out of the 62 seats, and also the most effectively organised. In addition, they had members in various positions of responsibility in both areas of influence: village heads (kochō), subdistrict heads (kuchō) and elected members of assemblies at village and subdistrict level. There were also a number of party members with positions of responsibility within the administration.

According to Sato Jiro, Mishima had received three secret orders upon appointment:

- To destroy the Jiyūtō
- To develop his own party, the newly created Rikken Teiseitō
- To build certain roads

One of the first things Mishima did was to purge the administration of ninety members of Jiyūtō – this included school teachers who were government employees.

== Action in Aizu ==
Mishima started setting up the Aizu Rukugun Rengōkai (Six Aizu Districts' Joint Committee) to rubber-stamp some controversial policies concerning the road he was building - and for which the local community would have to foot much of the bill. Mishima wanted this Rengōkai to consist of thirty members, five from each district. However, the rules committee set up to supervise the election, decided to make the number of representatives from each district reflect the size of the population, and that they should be directly elected by all male taxpayers twenty years old or older. Although Mishima originally wanted to have indirect elections he accepted this, and by early March 46 members had been elected. This election was questioned by the Aizu Jiyūtō, and Igarashi Chikarasuke, the administrative head of Yama district, was sacked and replaced by Satō Jirō.

When the Rengōkai met on 16 March, Nakajima Yuhachi was elected chairman. Two resolutions were accepted:

- All Aizu residents between the ages of 15 and 60 (excluding the disabled and the widowed) should provide one day of corvée labour each month for a period of two years
- Those disinclined to work could pay a substitute labour tax of fifteen sen a day for males, and 10 sen a day for females.

Two conditions were added to this:

- The Central government should grant supplementary funds
- The corvée labourers should only work on flat land, with all work in the mountains and bridges being done by professionals.

The Rengōkai did not deal with the course of the road, the level of supplementary funds from the government, or how the tax was to be gathered.

In June it was discovered that the contribution from central government had been reduced from 260,000 yen to 98,000 yen. However, the government also agreed an interest free loan to the Teiseito of 196,000 Yen, which had recruited unemployed ex-Samurai and established its headquarters, the Nisshinkan. Mishima, suspended the Rengōkai, taking charge of the road building himself. Furthermore, the corvée labour and taxes were deemed to start in March. Igarashi and other Jiyūtō activists were able to get a majority of the Rengōkai to sign a petition for a special session of the Rengōkai to oppose these developments. This was accompanied by Jiyūtō activists proposing civil disobedience against the levies, principally in Yama, Kawanuma and Ōnuma districts.

On 18 August the Jiyūtō members of the Rengōkai met in secret and resolved that Jiyūtō should organise more widespread and structured protests to the road building programme, utilising lawsuits and boycotts. That night the government reacted to the agitation by organising attacks on Jiyūtō activists while they were asleep. This is known as the Shimizuya jiken.
