= Etō Shinpei =

Japanese statesman (1834–1874)

- 江藤 新平
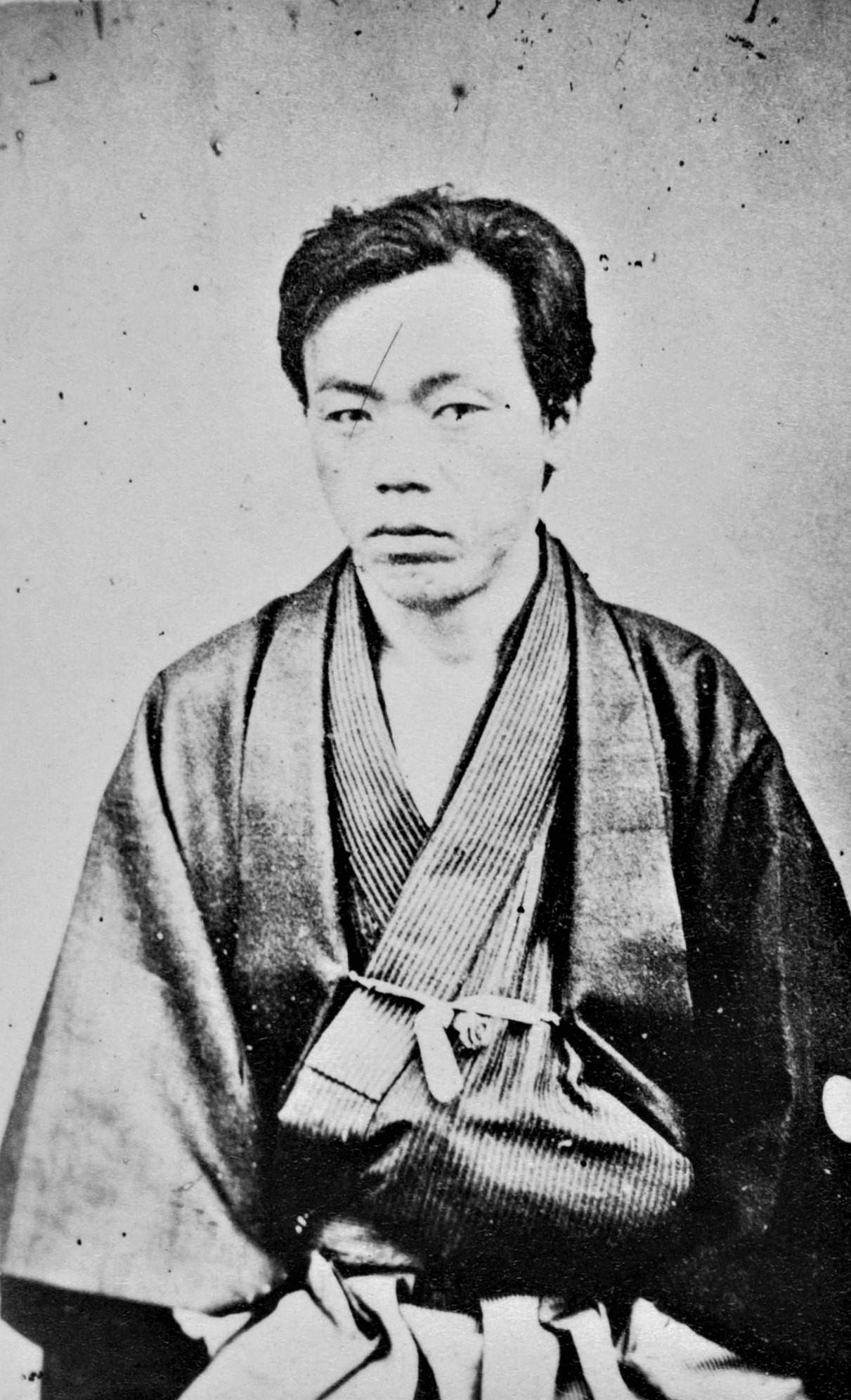

Lord of Justice
- In office 31 May 1872 – 25 October 1873
- Monarch: Meiji
- Preceded by: Office established
- Succeeded by: Ōki Takatō

Personal details
- Born: 18 March 1834 Saga, Hizen, Japan
- Died: 13 April 1874 (aged 40) Tokyo, Japan
- Party: Aikoku Kōtō
- Relatives: Kosaburo Eto (great-grandson)
- Known for: Saga Rebellion

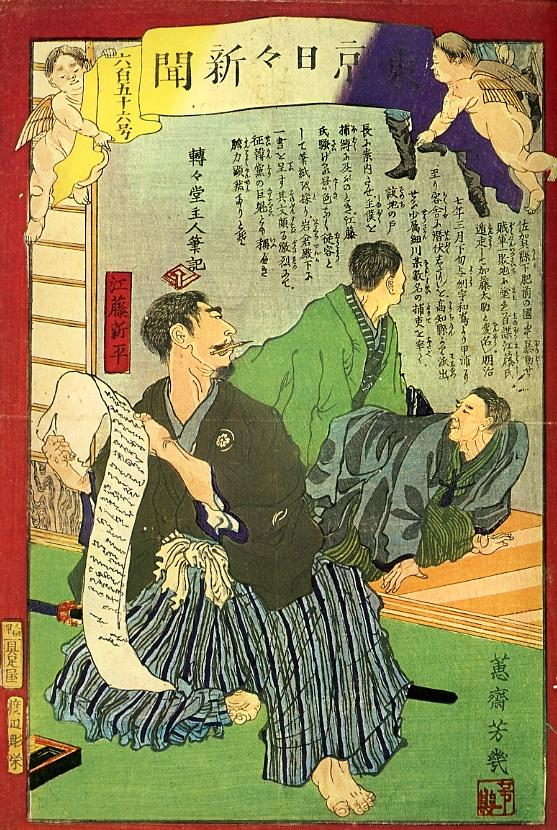
Etō Shinpei during the Saga Rebellion (Tōkyō Nichinichi Shimbun, Utagawa Yoshiiku, 1874)

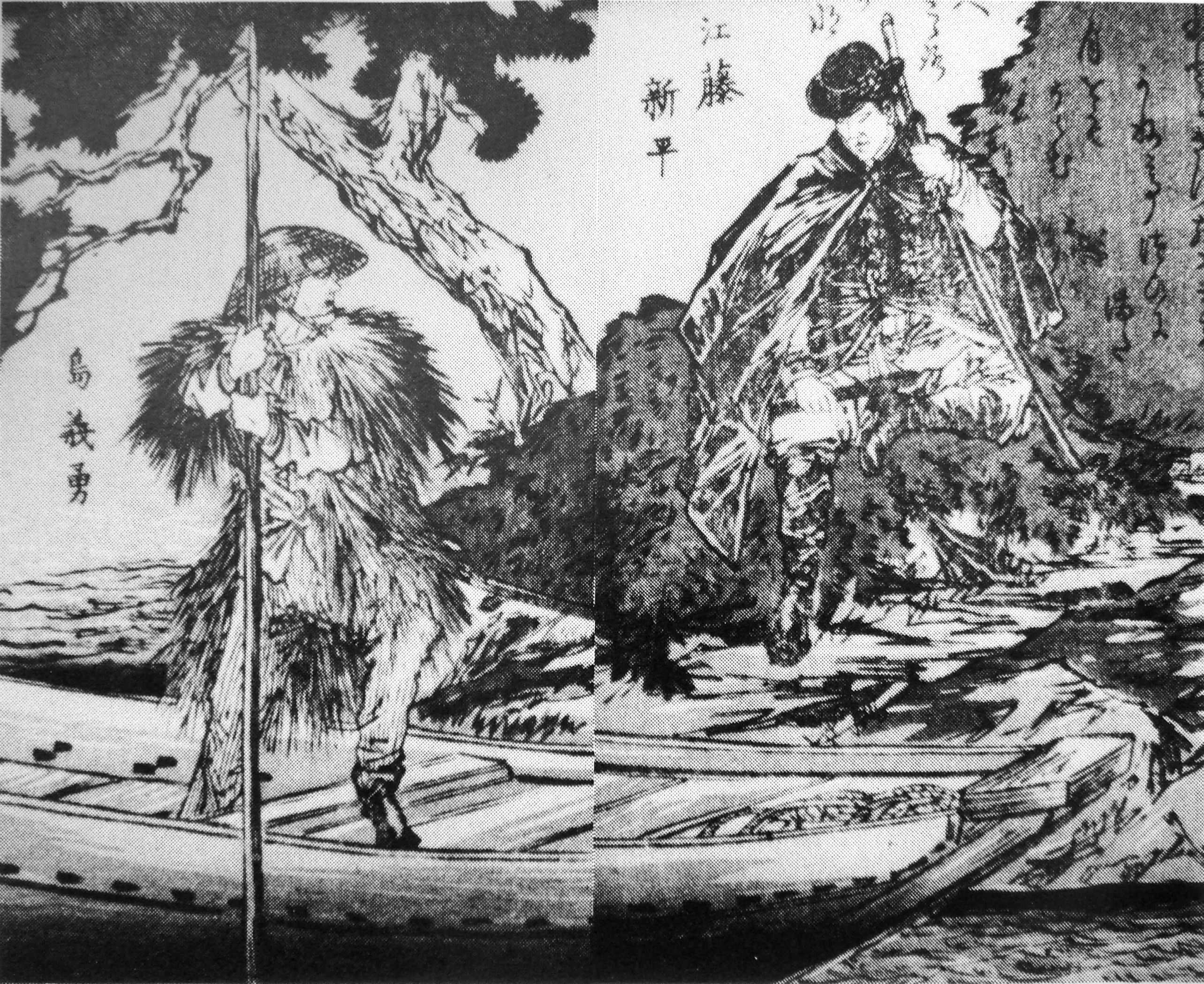
Etō Shinpei and Shima Yoshitake as fugitives 1874

Etō Shinpei (江藤 新平; 18 March 1834 – 13 April 1874) was a Japanese statesman during the early Meiji period, remembered chiefly for his role in the unsuccessful Saga Rebellion.

== Early life and Meiji bureaucrat ==
Etō was born into a crestless and poor samurai family in Yae (modern-day Saga), in Hizen Province (present-day Prefectures of Saga and Nagasaki), on the island of Kyushu. He lived near the house of Sagara Chian (Tomoyasu) who also played an influential role in Meiji Japan. In 1848 Etō entered the school of the Nabeshima Clan and soon drew attention as a gifted young man, but after his father lost his employment, he continued his studies in a private school run by Edayoshi Shinyō, an ardent adherent of National Studies (Kokugaku). Together with other ambitious young samurai such as Ōkuma Shigenobu, Soejima Taneomi, Ōki Takatō, Shima Yoshitake, Etō joined the Gizai-dōmei ("Ceremonial League") established by Edayoshi in 1850. Three years later he wrote a paper (Tokaisaku), in which he propagated the opening of Japan and a series of plans to gain economic and military strength. After his marriage (1857) he worked for the Saga domain.

During the Boshin War to overthrow the Tokugawa shogunate, he served as a general in the imperial army.

After the Meiji Restoration, Etō was appointed to a number of posts, including that of Lord of Justice in 1872, and was responsible for drafting Japan's first modern penal code the (Kaitei Ritsurei). In 1873, he became a sangi (Councilor) in the Daijō-kan, but resigned the same year, after the Seikanron proposal made by Saigō Takamori to invade Korea was rejected.

== Anti-government agitator and rebel ==
After resigning from the government, Etō returned home to his native Saga, and gathered together a group of disaffected former samurai who were unhappy with the current regime and loss of their social and economic privileges. He formed the Aikoku Kōtō political party which criticized the government and called for the formation of a national assembly. Receiving little support, he then resorted to armed insurrection (the Saga Rebellion), gathering some 3000 followers, attacking a local bank for funds, and capturing government offices. The revolt was quickly suppressed by government forces under Ōkubo Toshimichi, and Etō, along with 12 other ringleaders, was executed. Then their heads were displayed in public. It was the ultimate sanction in Japan.

== See also ==
- María Luz Incident
- Kosaburo Eto – great-grandson; committed protest suicide 95 years after Etō Shinpei's death.

== Reference and further reading ==
- Duus, Peter. The Abacus and the Sword: The Japanese Penetration of Korea, 1895–1910 (Twentieth-Century Japan - the Emergence of a World Power, 4). University of California Press (1998). ISBN 0-520-21361-0.
- Hane, Mikiso. Modern Japan: A Historical Survey. Westview Press (2001). ISBN 0-8133-3756-9
- Harries, Meirion. Soldiers of the Sun: The Rise and Fall of the Imperial Japanese Army. Random House; Reprint edition (1994). ISBN 0-679-75303-6
- Najita, Tetsuo. Japan: The Intellectual Foundations of Modern Japanese Politics. University Of Chicago Press (1980). ISBN 0-226-56803-2
- Ryōtarō Shiba 1971 Saigetsu (Kodansha).
