= Nakae Chōmin =

Japanese politician

- 中江 兆民
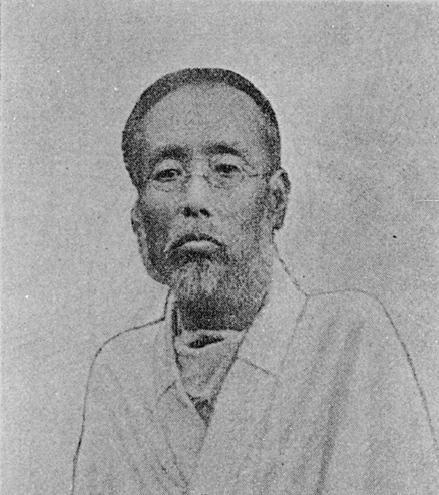
- Likeness from the Meiji Jinbutsu Shokan

Member of the House of Representatives
- In office 2 July 1890 – 27 February 1891
- Preceded by: Constituency established
- Succeeded by: Ryōhei Murayama
- Constituency: Osaka 4th

Personal details
- Born: 8 December 1847 Kōchi, Kōchi, Japan
- Died: 13 December 1901 (aged 54) Koishikawa, Tokyo, Japan
- Resting place: Aoyama Cemetery
- Party: Liberal
- Education: Daigakkō
- Known for: Development of liberalism

Nakae Chōmin (中江 兆民; December 8, 1847 – December 13, 1901) was the pen-name of a journalist, political theorist and statesman in Meiji-period Japan. His real name was Nakae Tokusuke (中江 篤助). His major contribution was the popularization of the egalitarian doctrines of the French philosopher Jean-Jacques Rousseau in Japan. As a result, Nakae is thought to have been a major force in the development of liberalism in early Japanese politics.

== Biography ==
Nakae was born in Kōchi, Tosa Domain (present day Kōchi Prefecture). His father was an ashigaru, or lower ranking foot soldier in the service of the Yamauchi clan of Tosa. Having displayed an early aptitude for Western learning, after studies at the domain academy, Nakae was selected to study French and Dutch at Nagasaki and Edo. Later, he worked as a translator for the French minister to Japan, Léon Roches.

After the Meiji Restoration, he was selected as a member of the Iwakura Mission and travelled abroad (under the patronage of the Justice Ministry) to study philosophy, history, and French literature in France, where he lived from 1871 until 1874. While in France, Nakae translated some of Rousseau's works into Japanese (most importantly, Rousseau's "Social Contrat") and Eugène Véron's L'esthétique. He joined Saionji Kinmochi at Emile Acollas' Law School for foreign students in Paris.

Upon his return to Japan, Nakae served as a lower-ranked secretary of the Genrōin. However, he soon became disenchanted by corruption and factionalism in Japanese government, and resigned to devote himself to other literary and educational activities.

In 1874, he established his own French language school. In 1881, he helped to start the daily newspaper, “Oriental Free Press” (東洋自由新聞, Tōyō Jiyū Shinbun), through which he propagated Western democratic ideas. The newspaper was soon suppressed by the authorities for propagation of republicanism and lese majesty. The newspaper reemerged as the milder “Free Press” (自由新聞, Jiyū Shinbun) the following year with Nakae as its chief editor. The newspaper continued to attack factionalism and corruption in government, and to agitate for revision of the unequal treaties and the rapid implementation of an elected national assembly. In 1887, Nakae was sentenced to exile from Tokyo under the Peace Preservation Ordinance for publishing critical articles about the Meiji oligarchy. He spent the next few years in Osaka, where he started the "Newspaper of the Dawn" (東雲新聞, Shinonome Shinbun). Nakae was pardoned after the promulgation of the Meiji Constitution in 1889, and he and his family moved back to Tokyo in October of that year.

During the 1890 General Election, Nakae successfully ran for a seat in the lower house of the Diet of Japan from the Osaka 4th District. He allied with Itagaki's Jiyūto political party, and its successor, the Rikken Jiyūtō, establishing a newspaper, Rikken Jiyūtō Shinbun, as the party's official mouthpiece. However, Nakae soon became disenchanted with the domination of the Jiyūtō by members of the former Tosa clan, and its blind opposition to policies of the Chōshū-dominated government. He left government for health reasons and for alcoholism, and retired to Hokkaido, where he again established a newspaper. He ran for office again in the 1892 General Election, and after re-election was a strong supporter of railroad development.

Nakae continued to write, despite poverty and illness, until his death of esophageal cancer in 1901. His grave is at Aoyama Cemetery, Tokyo.

== Works ==
- A Discourse by Three Drunkards on Government

== See also ==
- Fukuzawa Yukichi
- Natsume Sōseki
- Susumu Nishibe
- Tsuneari Fukuda
- Yamamoto Tsunetomo
