= Kosaburo Eto =

Japanese nationalist, thinker and social activist

Kosaburo Eto (江藤 小三郎, Etō Kosaburō; 20 April 1946 – 11 February 1969) was a Japanese nationalist, thinker, social activist, Japan Ground Self-Defense Force official, and member of a leading Japanese political family. He is best known for committing suicide through self-immolation as a nationalist protest in front of the Japanese Houses of Parliament.

== Early life ==
Kosaburo Eto was born in Saga prefecture on 20 April 1946, the great-grandson of Eto Shinpei, a statesman during the Meiji restoration (remembered chiefly for his role in the unsuccessful Saga Rebellion), the grandson of Eto Shinsaku, a member of the House of Representatives of Japan and close adviser of Inukai Tsuyoshi and the third son of Eto Natsuo, a member of the House of Representatives of Japan. He left Japan Ground Self-Defense Force Cadet School in Yokosuka without a diploma.

== Ritual suicide and an impact on Yukio Mishima ==
On 11 February 1969 (the National Foundation Day of Japan) aged 22, he committed suicide through self-immolation next to the Memorial Hall of Constitutional Politics, located in front of the Houses of Parliament. He left a kakuseisho (覚醒書) (suicide letter) expressing alarm over the state of the Nation. In 1969 the leading Japanese literary figure and nationalist Yukio Mishima noted in his Wakaki Samurai no tameno Seishin kohwa (『若きサムラヒのための精神講話』, Spiritual lectures for the young Samurai) as I am one of the readers who read the most intense criticism against the politics as a dream or art for seriousness of Young Kosaburo Eto, who set himself on fire.

== Aftermath ==
On 11 February 1975, a memorial ceremony in honour of the life of Kosaburo Eto took place at Nogi Shrine, in Akasaka, Tokyo.

== Jisei no Uta (death poem) ==
Eto's kakuseisho ended with the following jisei or death poem, a common element in Japanese ritual suicide.:

- 「あらあらし 空にこみとり大楠の 大御心を誰ぞ知るらん」

Under the silhouette of the big camphor tree swinging in the stiff wind against the sky, I think - who knows the Mikado's will, perhaps nobody knows it.

- 「かくすれば かくなるものと知りつつも やむにやまれぬ 大和魂」

I know if I take risks, it makes no difference to me, but I dare to act with a Yamato Spirit.

He wrote three kakuseisho and sent them to Shintaro Ishihara, Yukio Mishima, and Kiyoshi Oka.

== See also ==
- Kazuhisa Ogawa, military analyst, a contemporary at Shonen ko-ka gakko (少年工科学校, Japan Ground Self-Defense Force Cadet School).
