= Fukuchi Gen'ichirō =

Japanese critic and playwright

- 福地 源一郎
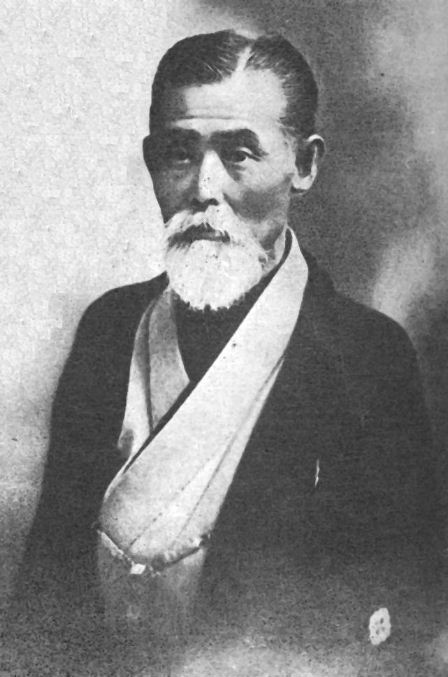
- Born: May 13, 1841; Nagasaki, Japan
- Died: January 4, 1906 (aged 64)
- Other name: Fukuchi Ōchi

Fukuchi Gen'ichirō (福地 源一郎; May 13, 1841 – January 4, 1906) was a Japanese politician, critic and author, also known under the pseudonym Fukuchi Ōchi (福地 桜痴).

== Biography ==
Fukuchi Gen'ichirō was born in Nagasaki, Japan. He traveled Europe as a translator, and in 1874, became a main writer for the Tokyo Nichi Nichi Shimbun newspaper. In 1882, he formed the Constitutional Imperial Rule Party.
