= April 16 incident =

1929 arrests of 700 Japanese socialists

The April 16th incident (Japanese: 四・一六事件) of 1929 was a campaign by the Japanese government against anti-government movements, including leftist movements. The incident stemmed from the government suppression of leftists in the March 15 incident of 1928, and ended in 600-700 arrests and the Japanese Communist Party was forced to go underground.

== Background ==
After the first elections with universal suffrage were held in 1928 in Japan, left-wing movements in Japan gained momentum. As a result, the Tanaka government's Ministry of Justice created a "thought section" to target left-wing groups. This led to the March 15 incident, which was specifically directed towards communists. Starting on March 15, multiple offices and homes were raided and 3,500 arrests were made over the entire year. Laws were then tightened against left-wing groups, including the ban against many groups. In addition, the maximum penalty for breaking the Peace Preservation Law was raised to the death penalty.

== Incident ==
The second wave of arrests since the March 15th incident began with the April 16th incident in 1929, after the authorities discovered that many communist leaders had been missed in the March 15th incident. On that one day, 600 to 700 suspected communists were arrested - later, half of them were found guilty.

== Aftermath ==
The fledgling Japanese Communist Party (JCP) was dealt a major blow by the arrests of April 16 and forced underground. This led the Soviet Union, which had supported the JCP, to turn its focus to China instead of Japan for a communist revolution.
