= Rikken Teiseitō =

Rikken Teiseitō 立憲帝政党
- Leader: Fukuchi Gen'ichirō
- Founded: March 16, 1882
- Dissolved: September 1, 1883
- Succeeded by: Shimpotō
- Headquarters: Tokyo
- Ideology: Conservatism

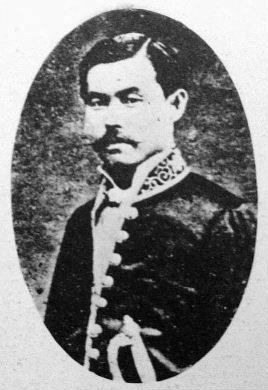
Fukuchi Gen'ichirō, founder of the Rikken Teiseitō

The Rikken Teiseitō (立憲帝政党, "Constitutional Imperial Rule Party") was a short-lived conservative political party in the Meiji period Empire of Japan. It was also known as simply the Teiseitō.

== History ==
The Teiseitō was founded in March 1882 by the editor of the Tokyo Nichi Nichi Shimbun, Fukuchi Gen'ichirō, and a number of bureaucrats and conservative journalists as a political support group for the conservative Meiji oligarchy. The new party was supported by Itō Hirobumi and Inoue Kaoru. It advocated a constitutional monarchy with a constitution, to be eventually granted by Emperor Meiji, an electoral franchise based on adult male property holders, and restrictions on freedom of speech and assembly. It viewed the populist political parties, especially the Rikken Kaishintō and the Jiyūtō, as its main rivals. It was disbanded in September 1883.
