= Seikanron =

1873 Japanese debate on invading Korea

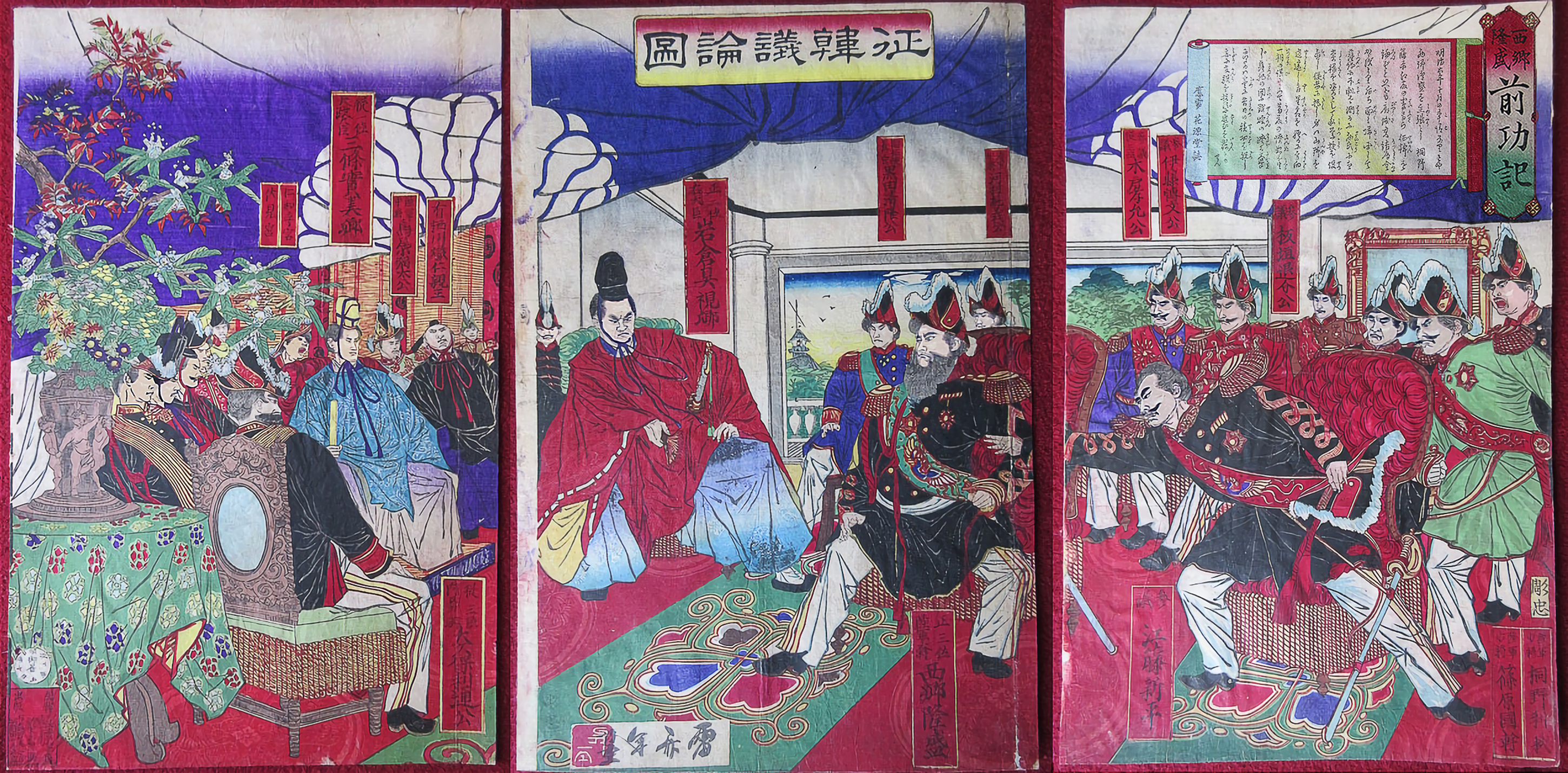
1877 painting depicting the debate over war on Korea, with Saigō Takamori sitting in the center.

In 1873 during the Meiji era, the Japanese government and the restoration coalition established against the bakufu debated intensely over the feasibility of a punitive military expedition against Korea (Japanese: 征韓論 seikanron, (Note: translated variously as 'Advocacy of a punitive expedition to Korea'; 'Proposal to Punish Korea', or 'Argument for a Conquest of Korea') Korean: 정한론). The Seikanron split the Meiji government into factions, but resulted in a decision not to send a military expedition to Korea.

== Historical background ==
After the Meiji Restoration and the overthrow of the Shogunate in 1868, the newly formed Meiji government embarked on reforms to centralize and modernize Japan. The Imperial side did not pursue its objective to expel foreign interests from Japan, instead adhering to the treaties signed during the bakumatsu period with the ultimate goal of revising them and building up the nation's strength by continuing with reforms begun under the shogunate. In foreign affairs, the government had taken steps to establish a foreign affairs bureau to take over Japan's external relations which was previously conducted by the bakufu.

Although the shogunate had been overthrown, the Ōuetsu Reppan Dōmei, an alliance of northeastern domains continued resistance to the new government. Enomoto Takeaki, a former shogunate naval officer, had taken control of eight of the best warships of the Shōgun's navy and joined the northeastern alliance. After the defeat of the Ōuetsu Reppan Dōmei, he had fled farther north to Hokkaido where he occupied the city of Hakodate and set up the Republic of Ezo. In the spring of 1869, the central government began operations against the last stronghold of military opposition and in May 1869 opposition forces surrendered. Enomoto Takeaki's refusal to surrender and his escape to Hokkaido with a large part of former Tokugawa Navy's best warships embarrassed the Meiji government politically. The imperial side had to rely on considerable military assistance from the most powerful domains as the government did not have enough power, especially naval power, to defeat Enomoto on its own. Although the rebel forces in Hokkaido surrendered, the government's response to the rebellion demonstrated the need for a strong centralized government. Even before the incident the restoration leaders had realized the need for greater political, economic and military centralization.

=== Japanese attempts to establish relations with Korea ===
During the Edo period Japan's relationship and trade with Korea were conducted through intermediaries with the Sō family in Tsushima, A Japanese outpost, called the waegwan, was allowed to be maintained in Tongnae near Pusan. The traders were confined to the outpost and no Japanese were allowed to travel to the Korean capital at Seoul. The bureau of foreign affairs wanted to change these arrangements to one based on modern state-to-state relations. In late 1868, a member of the Sō daimyō informed the Korean authorities that a new government had been established and an envoy would be sent from Japan.

In 1869 the envoy from the Meiji government arrived in Korea carrying a letter requesting to establish a goodwill mission between the two countries; the letter contained the seal of the Meiji government rather than the seals authorized by the Korean Court for the Sō family to use. It also used the character ko (皇) rather than taikun (大君) to refer to the Japanese emperor. The Koreans only used this character to refer to the Chinese emperor and to the Koreans it implied ceremonial superiority to the Korean monarch, which would make the Korean monarch a vassal or subject of the Japanese ruler. The Japanese were however just reacting to their domestic political situation where the Shōgun had been replaced by the emperor. The Koreans remained in the Sinocentric world where China was at the centre of interstate relations and as a result refused to receive the envoy.

Unable to force the Koreans into accepting a new set of diplomatic symbols and practices, the Japanese began to change them unilaterally. To an extent, this was a consequence from the abolition of the domains in August 1871, whereby it meant that was simply no longer possible for the Sō family of Tsushima to act as intermediaries with the Koreans. Another, equally important factor was the appointment of Soejima Taneomi as the new minister of foreign affairs, who had briefly studied law at Nagasaki with Guido Verbeck. Soejima was familiar with international law and pursued a strong forward policy in East Asia, where he used the new international rules in his dealings with the Chinese and the Koreans and with the Westerners. During his tenure, the Japanese slowly began to transform the traditional framework of relations managed by the Tsushima domain into the foundation for the opening of trade and the establishment of "normal" interstate, diplomatic relations with Korea.

== Meiji politics ==
The south western domains of Satsuma, Chōshu, Tosa and Hizen were the backbone of the Meiji regime and that gave the government its power, authority and its money. The daimyo of these domains were still very much a factor, and the domain elders were jealous of their institutional and parochial interests. As a consequence, local and national loyalties were frequently at odds.

=== Political and structural reforms ===
Many in the restoration coalition had recognized the need for centralized authority. Although the imperial side was victorious against the bakufu, the early Meiji government was weak, so the leaders had to maintain a strong standing with their domains whose military forces were essential for fitting the government's needs. Political divisions in the form of feudal domains, lord-vassal relations within the samurai elite and separation of social classes within Japanese society were major impediments to centralization. However, in Japan's historical memory there was an era of unification under a central government headed by the emperor and the Tokugawa years had spurred economic and cultural integration. For the Meiji regime it was also fortunate that personal relations had usually been established during the years that preceded the Restoration and by cooperation between the various domains during the military campaigns against the bakufu and hold-out domains, a high level of education and social skills also helped to lubricate and cement friendships between the member of the domains.

=== Abolition of the domains ===
In January 1869, the four south western domains of Satsuma, Choshu, Tosa, and Hizen had submitted a petition to the court stating that they be permitted to return their registers of their domains to the imperial government. By the time the court formally accepted the four-domain petition on July 25, 1869, and made it compulsory, most of the nearly three hundred domains had submitted similar requests. All daimyōs were now re-appointed governors (Chiji) of their domains, but without the privileges of hereditary succession. In return for surrendering their hereditary authority to the central government, they were also allowed to retain ten percent of the tax revenues for household expenses. As governors, the former daimyōs could name subordinates, but only if the subordinates met qualification levels established by the central government. The Return of the Registers (hanseki hōkan) was marked a first step toward centralization and the administrative unification of Japan. The Daimyos still retained much of their authority, but they now governed as national officers and not for themselves. In August 1871, the domains were fully abolished (haihan chiken) and replaced by prefectures.

=== Reform of government institutions ===
Another more important reform was the establishment of a much more powerful executive institution than had previously existed in the new government, the Dajokan. The top post, Minister of the Right (Udaijin), went to Sanjō Sanetomi. Below him were three Great Councillors (Dainagon); these positions went initially to two Court nobles - Iwakura Tomomi and Tokudaiji Sanenori and one former daimyo, Nabeshima Naomasa of Hizen. Nabeshima withdrew after a year and died in early 1871, but two more Court nobles were appointed to this office in December 1869 and November 1870, respectively. Next came the Councillors (Sangi), all of whom were samurai: initially two - Soejima Taneomi of Hizen and Maebara Issei of Chōshu, then four with the addition of Ōkubo Toshimichi of Satsuma and Hirosawa Saneomi of Chōshu. During the next two years the number of Sangi varied, from a minimum of two to a maximum of seven, and six other samurai held office at one time or another - Kido Koin of Chōshu, Ōkuma Shigenobu of Hizen, Saigō Takamori of Satsuma, and Sasaki Takayuki, Saito Toshiyuki, and Itagaki Taisuke, all from Tosa.

Under the Dajokan there were six departments or ministries that had been established: Civil Affairs (Mimbushō), Finance (Ōkurashō), War (Hyōbusho), Justice (Kyōbushō), Imperial Household (Kunaishō) and Foreign Affairs (Gaimushō). They were usually headed by imperial princes, Court nobles, or daimyo, but generally it was the samurai deputies who had effective control. Another decree issued at the same time, brought Court nobles and Daimyos together in a single order of nobility, to be called kazoku which also divided the samurai into two broad segments, shizoku (gentry) and sotsu (foot-soldiers). This replaced the existing multiplicity of ranks and instituted a review of hereditary stipends, and also revised the regulations concerning local office and finance.

=== Tensions with the Samurai ===
Serious divisions emerged in the restoration coalition that had overthrown the Shogunate. Reforms enacted by the Meiji government such as the abolition of the domains led to resentment.

== Debates ==
Saigō Takamori and his supporters insisted that Japan confront Korea due to the latter's refusal to recognize the legitimacy of Emperor Meiji as head of state of the Empire of Japan, and insulting treatment meted out to Japanese envoys attempting to establish trade and diplomatic relations. The war party also saw the issue in Korea as an ideal opportunity to find meaningful employment for the thousands of out-of-work samurai, who had lost most of their income and social standing in the new Meiji social and economic order. These samurai posed a threat to the government, and as a samurai himself Saigō sympathized with their situation.

According to orthodoxy, "Saigō himself volunteered to go to Korea as a special envoy, inviting an assassination attempt that would provide justification, if any were needed, for a punitive expedition." However Saigō's statement was an attempt to win over the support of Itagaki Taisuke. Additionally, while the expedition to Korea was aimed at providing income for unemployed samurai, Saigō did not object to the Inoue-Yoshida plan, which abolished samurai stipends. Thus Saigō's condemnation of Meiji's provocation against Korea in 1876 suggests that Saigō's intention may have merely been to "establish a firm relationship" with Korea. In any case, the other Japanese leaders strongly opposed these plans, partly from budgetary considerations, and partly from realization of the weakness of Japan compared with the Western countries from what they had witnessed during the Iwakura Mission.

While orthodox historians view the dispute as a matter of whether or not to invade Korea, the provocation against Korea in 1876 supports the claim that the Iwakura party never disagreed on the validity of an attack. Revisionists see the Seikanron as not a dispute of whether to invade, but when and how. The former because those returning from the Iwakura Mission believed that Japan was too weak to attract international attention and needed to focus on internal reforms, the latter because the separation of the government between the caretaker government and the Iwakura groups allowed power-struggle between them. (Ōkubo, for example, had no real position of power at that time, seeing as his position was taken up after his departure). The arguments against invading Korea were outlined in Ōkubo Toshimichi's "7 Points Document", dated October 1873, in which he argued that action against Korea was premature because Japan was in the stages of modernizing and an invasion would be far too costly for Japan to sustain. Ōkubo's views were supported by the anti-war faction which mostly consisted of those returning from the Iwakura Mission. Iwakura had the emperor reverse the decision to send Saigō as an envoy to Korea, thus putting an end to the debate.

As it was decided that no action was to be taken against Korea, many of the War Party, including Saigō and Itagaki, resigned from their government positions in protest. Saigō returned to his hometown of Kagoshima, although he never officially resigned from his role in the palace guard. Some historians (mainly orthodox) suggests that this political split paved the way for the 1874 Saga rebellion and the 1877 Satsuma Rebellion. Itagaki, on the other hand, became involved with the Aikoku Kōtō, a liberal political party, and rebelled against the Iwakura clique through legal means.

== See also ==
- Satsuma Rebellion
