= Aikoku Kōtō =

Public Party of Patriots
- Founder: Itagaki Taisuke; Etō Shinpei; Gotō Shōjirō
- Founded: January 1874
- Dissolved: 1875
- Ideology: Liberalism; Constitutionalism; Progressivism

The Aikoku Kōtō (愛国公党; "Public Party of Patriots") was a political party in Meiji-period Japan.

The Aikoku Kōtō was formed on 12 January 1874 by Itagaki Taisuke, Etō Shinpei, Gotō Shōjirō and others as part of the Freedom and People's Rights Movement. Its purpose was to petition the Meiji government to establish a national assembly and on 17 January submitted to the government a "Written Proposal for the Establishment of a House of Representatives".

The Aikoku Kōto stood on the theory of innate human rights, criticized the tyrannical government, and advocated the creation of a government in which the emperor and subjects were one (kunmin ittai). To this end, they also advocated that the commoners, including samurai, wealthy farmers, and wealthy merchants, be given the right to participate in government and that a Diet be established.

Fearing arrest after the failed Saga Rebellion, Itagaki disbanded it soon after its foundation in 1875.

However, Itagaki, Ueki Emori and others revived the party on May 5, 1890 in response to the situation after the split in the Daidōdan movement, who wanted to rally the former Liberal Party members to the Aikoku Kōtō (Patriotic Public Party). On May 14, the three factions decided to join together to form the Gung Tora Club, and on August 4, the Aikoku Kōtō was dissolved, and the four factions, including the Kyushu Dōshikai, joined together to form the Rikken Jiyū-to (Constitutional Liberal Party) on September 15.

The Aikoku Kōtō can be regarded as the first political party in Japan. It should not be confused with the Aikokusha movement in the latter half of the 1870s or with later ultranationalist movements with similar names.

== See also ==
- Liberalism in Japan
- List of liberal parties
- Liberal democracy
