= Government of Meiji Japan =

Historical government during Japan's centralization

The Government of Meiji Japan (明治政府, Meiji seifu) was the government that was formed by politicians of the Satsuma Domain and Chōshū Domain in the 1860s. The Meiji government was the early government of the Empire of Japan.

Politicians of the Meiji government were known as the Meiji oligarchy, who overthrew the Tokugawa shogunate.

== Early developments ==
After the Meiji Restoration, the leaders of the samurai who overthrew the Tokugawa shogunate had no clear agenda or pre-developed plan on how to run Japan. They did have a number of things in common; according to Andrew Gordon, “It was precisely their intermediate status and their insecure salaried position, coupled with their sense of frustrated ambition and entitlement to rule, that account for the revolutionary energy of the Meiji insurgents and their far-reaching program of reform”. most were in their mid-40s, and most were from the four tozama domains of western Japan (Chōshū, Satsuma, Tosa and Hizen). Although from lower-ranked samurai families, they had risen to military leadership roles in their respective domains, and came from a Confucian-based educational background which stressed loyalty and service to society. Finally, most either had first-hand experience in travel overseas, or second-hand experience through contacts with foreign advisors in Japan. As a result, they knew of the military superiority of the western nations and of the need for Japan to unify, and to strengthen itself to avoid the colonial fate of its neighbors on the Asian continent.

However, immediately after the resignation of Tokugawa Yoshinobu in 1867, with no official centralized government, the country was a collection of largely semi-independent daimyōs controlling feudal domains, held together by the military strength of the Satchō Alliance, and by the prestige of the Imperial Court in Kyoto.

In early March 1868, with the outcome of the Boshin War still uncertain, the new Meiji government summoned delegates from all of the domains to Kyoto to establish a provisional consultative national assembly. In April 1868, the Charter Oath was promulgated, in which Emperor Meiji set out the broad general outlines for Japan's development and modernization.

Two months later, in June 1868, the Seitaisho was promulgated to establish the new administrative basis for the Meiji government. This administrative code was drafted by Fukuoka Takachika and Soejima Taneomi (both of whom had studied abroad and who had a liberal political outlook), and was a mixture of western concepts such as division of powers, and a revival of ancient structures of bureaucracy dating back to Nara period. A central governmental structure, or Daijōkan, was established.

The Daijōkan had seven departments:

- Legislative (divided into an Upper Assembly of appointed bureaucrats, and a Lower Assembly of domain representatives)
- Executive
- Shinto
- Finance
- Military
- Foreign Affairs
- Civil Affairs

A separate Justice Ministry was established to create a form of separation of powers in imitation of the western countries.

The government instigated Fuhanken Sanchisei, dividing territory into urban prefectures or municipalities (fu) and rural prefectures (ken). Local government in Japan consisted of area confiscated from the Tokugawa, administered from the Department of Civil Affairs, and 273 semi-independent domains. Agents from the central government were sent to each of the domains to work towards administrative uniformity and conformation to the directives of the central government.

In early 1869, the national capital was transferred from Kyoto to Edo, which was renamed Tokyo (Eastern Capital).

== Abolition of the domains ==
In March 1869, the central government led by Ōkubo Toshimichi of Satsuma felt strong enough to effect further centralization. After merging the armies of Satsuma and Chōshū into a combined force, Ōkubo and Kido Takayoshi convinced the daimyō of Satsuma, Chōshū, Hizen and Tosa to surrender their domains to the emperor. Other daimyō were forced to do the same, and all were reappointed as “governors” to their respective domains, which were now treated as sub-divisions of the central government.

In the spring of 1871, Ōkubo, Kido, Inoue Kaoru, Yamagata Aritomo, Saigō Takamori, Ōyama Iwao, Sanjō Sanetomi and Iwakura held a secret meeting during which it was decided to proceed with abolition of the han domains entirely. Later that year, all of the ex-daimyō were summoned to the Emperor, and he issued a decree converting the domains to prefectures headed by a bureaucratic appointee from the central government. The daimyō were generously pensioned off into retirement, and their castles became the local administrative centers for the central government. This decree resulted in 305 units of local administration, which were reduced to 72 prefectures and 3 municipalities by the end of the year through various mergers, so that by the end of 1871, Japan had become a fully centralized state. The transition was made gradually, so that there was no disruption to the lives of the common people, and no outbreaks of resistance or violence. The central government absorbed all of the debts and obligations of the domains, and many former officials in the domains found new employment with the central government.

In 1871, the central government supported the creation of consultative assembles at the lowest levels of government, at the town, village and county level. The membership of the prefectural assemblies was drawn from these local assemblies. As the local assemblies only had the power of debate, and not legislation, they provided an important safety valve, without the ability to challenge the authority of the central government.

== Reorganization of the central government ==
In August 1869, during abolition of feudal domains and redrawing of local administrative boundaries, the central government itself was restructured to reinforce centralized authority. The idea of division of powers was abandoned. The new government was based on a national assembly (which met only once), an appointive Council of Advisors (Sangi), and eight Ministries:

- Civil Affairs (Home Ministry from 1873)
- Foreign Affairs
- Finance
- Army
- Navy
- Imperial Household
- Justice
- Public Works
- Education

Decision-making in the government was restricted to a closed oligarchy of perhaps 20 individuals (from Satsuma, Chōshū, Tosa, Hizen, and the Imperial Court). The Home Ministry, which appointed all prefectural governors and controlled police apparatus, was the most powerful, and Ōkubo left the Ministry of Finance to head the Home Ministry when it was established.

== Events leading to Okuma's resignation ==
One of the pressures on the early Meiji government was the division between those members of the oligarchy who favored some form of representative government, based on overseas models, and the more conservative faction who favored centralized, authoritarian rule.

A major proponent of representative government was Itagaki Taisuke, a powerful leader of Tosa forces who had resigned from his Council of State position over the Korean affair in 1873. Itagaki sought peaceful rather than rebellious means to gain a voice in government. Such movements were called The Freedom and People's Rights Movement. He started a movement aimed at establishing a constitutional monarchy and a national assembly. Itagaki and others wrote the Tosa Memorial in 1874 criticizing the unbridled power of the oligarchy and calling for the immediate establishment of representative government. Dissatisfied with the pace of reform after having rejoined the Council of State in 1875, Itagaki organized his followers and other democratic proponents into the nationwide Aikokusha (Society of Patriots) to push for representative government in 1878. In 1881, in an action for which he is best known, Itagaki helped found the Jiyūtō (Liberal Party), which favored French political doctrines. In 1882 Ōkuma Shigenobu established the Rikken Kaishintō (Constitutional Progressive Party), which called for a British-style constitutional democracy. In response, government bureaucrats, local government officials, and other conservatives established the Rikken Teiseitō (Imperial Rule Party), a pro-government party, in 1882. Numerous political demonstrations followed, some of them violent, resulting in further government political restrictions. The restrictions hindered the political parties and led to divisiveness within and among them. The Jiyūtō, which had opposed the Kaishintō, was disbanded in 1884, and Ōkuma resigned as Kaishintō president.

== Establishment of a national assembly ==
Government leaders, long preoccupied with violent threats to stability and the serious leadership split over the Korean affair, generally agreed that constitutional government should someday be established. Kido Takayoshi had favored a constitutional form of government since before 1874, and several proposals that provided for constitutional guarantees had been drafted. The oligarchy, however, while acknowledging the realities of political pressure, was determined to keep control. The Osaka Conference of 1875 resulted in the reorganization of government with an independent judiciary and an appointed Council of Elders tasked with reviewing proposals for a constitution. The emperor declared that "constitutional government shall be established in gradual stages" as he ordered the Genrōin to draft a constitution. In 1880, delegates from twenty-four prefectures held a national convention to establish the Kokkai Kisei Dōmei (League for Establishing a National Assembly).

Although the government was not opposed to parliamentary rule, confronted with the drive for "people's rights," it continued to try to control the political situation. New laws in 1875 prohibited press criticism of the government or discussion of national laws. The Public Assembly Law (1880) severely limited public gatherings by disallowing attendance by civil servants and requiring police permission for all meetings. Within the ruling circle, however, and despite the conservative approach of the leadership, Ōkuma continued as a lone advocate of British-style government, a government with political parties and a cabinet organized by the majority party, answerable to the national assembly. He called for elections to be held by 1882 and for a national assembly to be convened by 1883; in doing so, he precipitated a political crisis that ended with an 1881 imperial rescript declaring the establishment of a national assembly in 1890 and his dismissal from government.

Rejecting the British model, Iwakura Tomomi and other conservatives borrowed heavily from the Prussian constitutional system. Itō Hirobumi, one of the Meiji oligarchy and a Chōshū native long involved in government affairs, was charged with drafting Japan's constitution. He led a Constitutional Study Mission abroad in 1882, spending most of his time in Germany. He rejected the United States Constitution as "too liberal" and the British system as too unwieldy and having a parliament with too much control over the monarchy; the French and Spanish models were rejected as tending toward despotism.

== Strengthening of state authority ==
On Itō's return, one of the first acts of the government was to establish the kazoku peerage system with new ranks for the nobility. Five hundred persons from the old court nobility, former daimyō, samurai and commoners who had provided valuable service to the government were organized in five ranks: prince, marquis, count, viscount, and baron.

Itō was put in charge of the new Bureau for Investigation of Constitutional Systems in 1884, and the Council of State was replaced in 1885 with a cabinet headed by Itō as prime minister. The positions of chancellor, minister of the left, and minister of the right, which had existed since the seventh century as advisory positions to the emperor, were all abolished. In their place, the Privy Council was established in 1888 to evaluate the forthcoming constitution and to advise the emperor. To further strengthen the authority of the state, the Supreme War Council was established under the leadership of Yamagata Aritomo a Chōshū native who has been credited with the founding of the modern Imperial Japanese Army and was to become the first constitutional Prime Minister. The Supreme War Council developed a German-style general staff system with a chief of staff who had direct access to the emperor and who could operate independently of the army minister and civilian officials.

== The Meiji Constitution ==
When finally granted by the Emperor as a sign of his sharing his authority and giving rights and liberties to his subjects, the 1889 Constitution of the Empire of Japan (the Meiji Constitution) provided for the Imperial Diet (Teikoku Gikai), composed of a House of Representatives and a House of Peers. The House of Representatives was popularly elected with a very limited franchise of male citizens who paid 15 yen in national taxes (about 1 percent of the population) being eligible candidates. The House of Peers was composed of nobility and imperial appointees. There was also the provision for the creation of a Cabinet composed of ministers of State directly responsible to the Emperor and independent of the legislature. Functionally, the Diet was able to approve government legislation and initiate laws, make representations to the government, and submit petitions to the Emperor.

Nevertheless, in spite of these institutional changes, sovereignty still resided in the Emperor on the basis of his divine ancestry. The new constitution specified a form of government that was still authoritarian in character, with the Emperor holding the ultimate power and only minimal concessions made to popular rights and parliamentary mechanisms. Party participation was recognized as part of the political process. The Meiji Constitution was to last as the fundamental law until 1947, when it was supplanted by Japan's current constitution.

== Elections and political power ==
The first national election was held in 1890, and 300 members were elected to the lower house. Voting was restricted to males over twenty-five who paid income tax of minimally fifteen yen, a qualification to be lowered in 1900 and 1919 with universal male suffrage passed after much debate in 1925. Women never obtained the franchise until after World War II when a new constitution was introduced.

The Jiyūtō and Kaishintō parties had been revived in anticipation of the election and together won more than half of the seats. The House of Representatives soon became the arena for disputes between the politicians and the government bureaucracy over large issues, such as the budget, the ambiguity of the constitution on the Diet's authority, and the desire of the Diet to interpret the "will of the Emperor" versus the oligarchy's position that the cabinet and administration should "transcend" all conflicting political forces. The main leverage the Diet had was in its approval or disapproval of the budget, and it successfully wielded its authority henceforth.

In the early years of constitutional government, the strengths and weaknesses of the Meiji Constitution were revealed. A small clique of Satsuma and Chōshū elite continued to rule Japan, becoming institutionalized as an extraconstitutional body of genrō (elder statesmen). Collectively, the genrō made decisions reserved for the Emperor, and the genrō, not the Emperor, controlled the government politically. Throughout the period, however, political problems were usually solved through compromise, and political parties gradually increased their power over the government and held an ever larger role in the political process as a result.

== Political struggles ==
After the bitter political rivalries between the inception of the Diet in 1890 and 1894, when the nation was unified for the war effort against China, there followed five years of unity, unusual cooperation, and coalition cabinets. From 1900 to 1912, the Diet and the cabinet cooperated even more directly, with political parties playing larger roles. Throughout the entire period, the old Meiji oligarchy retained ultimate control but steadily yielded power to the opposition parties. The two major figures of the period were Yamagata Aritomo, whose long tenure (1868–1922) as a military and civil leader, including two terms as prime minister, was characterized by his intimidation of rivals and resistance to democratic procedures, and Itō Hirobumi, who was a compromiser and, although overruled by the genrō, wanted to establish a government party to control the House during his first term. When Itō returned as prime minister in 1898, he again pushed for a government party, but when Yamagata and others refused, Itō resigned. With no willing successor among the genrō, the Kenseitō (Constitutional Party) was invited to form a cabinet under the leadership of Ōkuma and Itagaki, a major achievement in the opposition parties' competition with the genrō. This success was short-lived: the Kenseitō split into two parties, the Kenseitō led by Itagaki and the Kensei Hontō (Real Constitutional Party) led by Ōkuma, and the cabinet ended after only four months. Yamagata then returned as prime minister with the backing of the military and the bureaucracy. Despite broad support of his views on limiting constitutional government, Yamagata formed an alliance with Kenseitō. Reforms of electoral laws, an expansion of the House to 369 members, and provisions for secret ballots won Diet support for Yamagata's budgets and tax increases. He continued to use imperial ordinances, however, to keep the parties from fully participating in the bureaucracy and to strengthen the already independent position of the military. When Yamagata failed to offer more compromises to the Kenseitō, the alliance ended in 1900, beginning a new phase of political development.

== Itō becomes Prime Minister ==
Itō and his protégé, Saionji Kinmochi finally succeeded in forming a progovernment party—the Rikken Seiyūkai (Constitutional Association of Political Friendship) —in September 1900, and a month later Itō became prime minister of the first Seiyūkai cabinet. The Seiyūkai held the majority of seats in the House, but Yamagata's conservative allies had the greatest influence in the House of Peers, forcing Itō to seek imperial intervention. Tiring of political infighting, Itō resigned in 1901. Thereafter, the prime ministership alternated between Yamagata's protégé, Katsura Tarō and Saionji. The alternating of political power was an indication of the two sides' ability to cooperate and share power and helped foster the continued development of party politics.

== End of the Meiji era ==
In 1911, Japan ended all unequal treaties. The Meiji period ended with the death of the Emperor Meiji in 1912 and the beginning of the Taishō era (1912–1926) as Crown Prince Yoshihito became the new emperor (Emperor Taishō). The end of the Meiji era was marked by huge government domestic and overseas investments and military programs, nearly exhausted credit, and a lack of foreign exchange to pay debts. But, the "Meiji regime" lasted until the end of the World War II in 1945.

The beginning of the Taishō era was marked by a political crisis that interrupted the earlier politics of compromise. When Prime Minister Saionji attempted to cut the military budget, the army minister resigned, bringing down the Seiyūkai cabinet. Both Yamagata and Saionji refused to resume office, and the genrō were unable to find a solution. Public outrage over the military manipulation of the cabinet and the recall of Katsura for a third term led to still more demands for an end to genrō politics. Despite old guard opposition, the conservative forces formed a party of their own in 1913, the Rikken Dōshikai (Constitutional Association of Allies), a party that won a majority in the House over the Seiyūkai in late 1914.
