= Itagaki Taisuke =

Japanese politician (1837–1919)

Count Itagaki Taisuke
- 板垣 退助
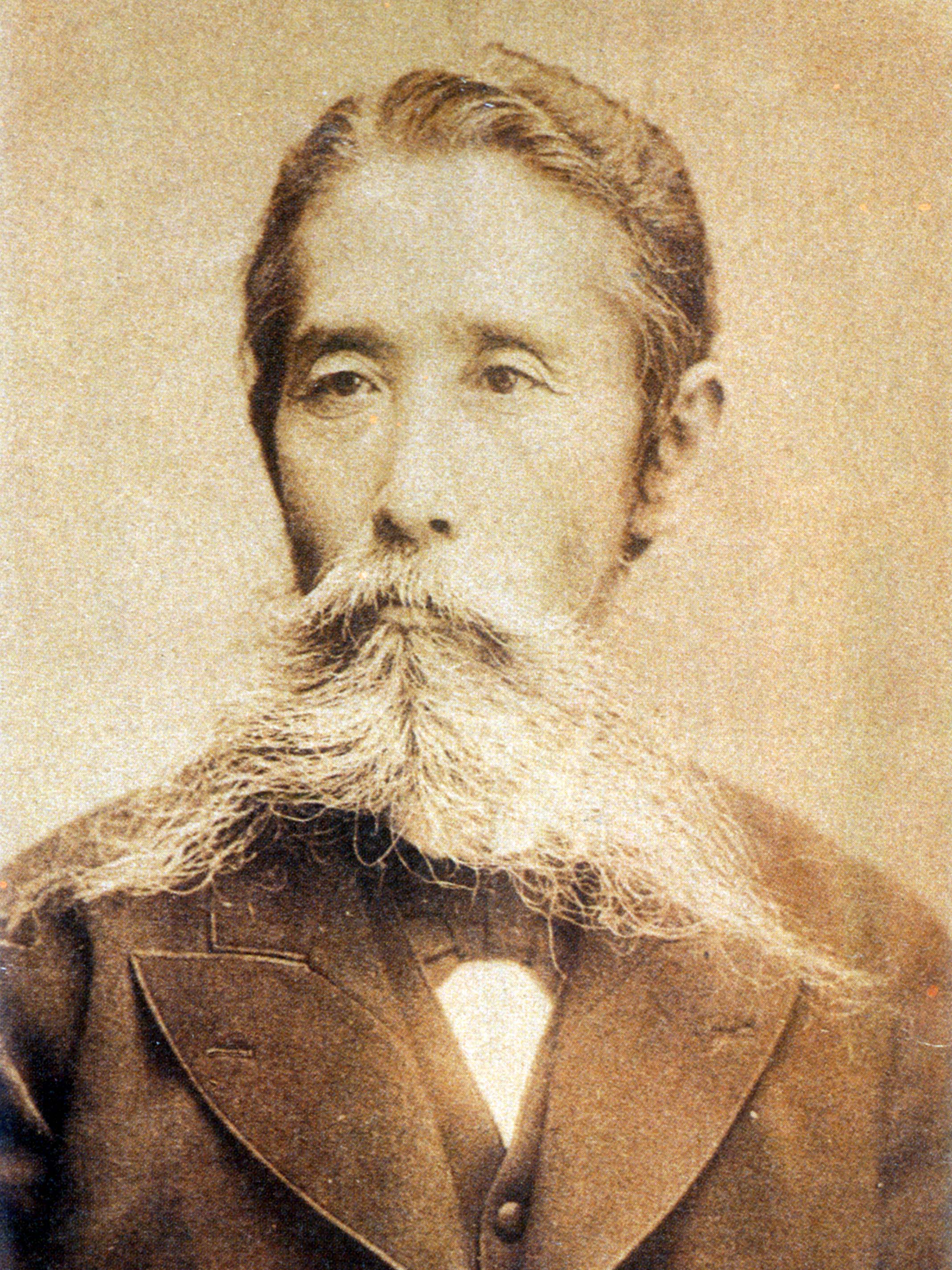

Minister of Home Affairs
- In office 14 April 1896 – 20 September 1896
- Prime Minister: Itō Hirobumi
- Preceded by: Nomura Yasushi
- Succeeded by: Kabayama Sukenori
- In office 30 June 1898 – 27 October 1898
- Prime Minister: Ōkuma Shigenobu
- Preceded by: Yoshikawa Akimasa
- Succeeded by: Saigō Tsugumichi

Personal details
- Born: 21 May 1837 Tosa Domain, Japan
- Died: 16 July 1919 (aged 82) Tokyo, Japan
- Party: Jiyūtō (1881–1884); Jiyūtō (1890–1898); Kenseitō (1898–1900)
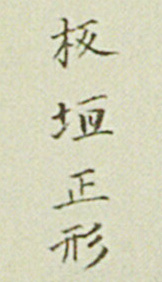
- Signature

Count Itagaki Taisuke (板垣 退助; 21 May 1837 – 16 July 1919) was a Japanese samurai, politician, and leader of the Freedom and People's Rights Movement (自由民権運動, Jiyū Minken Undō), which evolved into Japan's first political party, the Liberal Party (Jiyūtō). His activism in favour of a parliamentary democracy was a pivotal influence on the political development of Meiji Japan.

A native of Tosa Domain, Itagaki was a leading figure in the Meiji Restoration and held a series of posts in the new government, including that of Councillor of State (参議, sangi). In 1873, he resigned from government after his proposal for a military expedition to Korea, a policy known as Seikanron, was rejected by the ruling oligarchy. After his resignation, Itagaki formed the Aikoku Kōtō (Public Party of Patriots), Japan's first political association, and launched a political movement aimed at establishing a representative assembly. He submitted a memorial to the government in 1874 calling for the creation of a national assembly, which, though initially dismissed, sparked a nationwide debate and is considered the foundational event of the Freedom and People's Rights Movement.

Itagaki organized his political followers in his native Tosa into the Risshisha, and in 1881, he founded the Liberal Party (Jiyūtō), widely regarded as Japan's first modern political party. He survived an assassination attempt in 1882 and travelled to Europe the same year, deepening his exposure to Western political thought. After the Meiji Constitution was promulgated in 1889, Itagaki continued his political career, serving as Minister of Home Affairs in cabinets led by Itō Hirobumi and Ōkuma Shigenobu.

== Early life ==
Itagaki was born into a middle-ranking samurai family in Tosa Domain (present-day Kōchi Prefecture). Following the Meiji Restoration in 1868, he was appointed to several posts in the new Meiji government, becoming a Councillor of State (sangi) in 1869. He was part of the coalition that overthrew the Tokugawa shogunate and was involved in the early formation of the new regime.

== Advocacy for representative government ==
=== The Seikanron debate and resignation ===
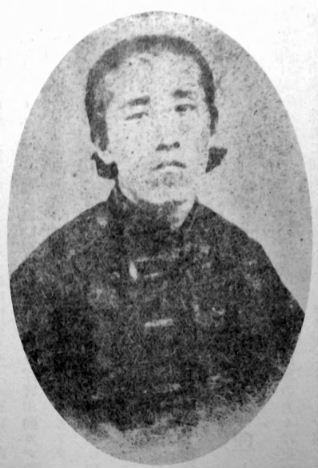
Itagaki c. 1870

The first major schism within the Meiji oligarchy occurred in 1873 over the question of invading Korea, a debate known as the Seikanron. Itagaki, along with Saigō Takamori, Etō Shimpei, Gotō Shōjirō and other councillors, was a key advocate for a military expedition. Proponents of the invasion argued that it would provide an outlet for the disaffected samurai class, which had lost its traditional status and privileges after the Restoration, and would enhance Japan's international prestige. However, the plan was strongly opposed by leaders such as Ōkubo Toshimichi, Iwakura Tomomi, Ōkuma Shigenobu, and Ōki Takatō. Having just returned from the Iwakura Mission to the West, they argued that Japan's primary focus should be on internal reforms and modernization, not foreign military adventures.

The "peace party" ultimately prevailed, and the proposal to invade Korea was rejected in October 1873. Angered by the decision, Itagaki, Saigō, Etō Shimpei, Gotō Shōjirō, and Soejima Taneomi resigned from the government. While Saigō returned to his native Satsuma Domain and later led an armed rebellion, Itagaki chose a different path of opposition. He pursued his objectives through political means, a decision that Akita describes as making him "truly a revolutionary" for choosing non-violent political action over the traditional method of armed revolt. Itagaki declared, "Saigō fights the government with arms, but we will fight it with people's rights (minken)."

=== The Tosa Memorial and political agitation ===
On 12 January 1874, shortly after his resignation, Itagaki formed the Aikoku Kōtō (Public Party of Patriots), Japan's first political association. The party's prospectus, heavily influenced by Western political thought, was a strong critique of the Meiji oligarchy and a call for representative government. It declared: "When men were created by heaven, there were attached to them certain fixed, inalienable rights... these rights, having been bestowed upon men equally by heaven, cannot be usurped by human power."

A few days later, on 17 January, Itagaki and a group of eight associates, including Gotō Shōjirō and Etō Shimpei, submitted the "Memorial for the Establishment of an Elective Assembly" (民撰議院設立建白書, Minsen Giin Setsuritsu Kenpakusho) to the government. The memorial was a skillfully drafted document that criticized the unchecked power of the oligarchy, stating that "the governing power lies not with the Crown on the one hand, nor with the people on the other, but with the officials alone." It argued that to remedy the arbitrary nature of government and to strengthen the nation, a "council-chamber chosen by the people" must be established. The memorial invoked the principle of "no taxation without representation" and asserted that a national assembly would create a sense of unity between the government and the people, thereby making the country strong.

The government's initial reaction was dismissive. Ōkubo Toshimichi wrote that "no one is impressed by it," and that the petition was a "blunder" by disgruntled former officials. However, the memorial's publication in the press sparked a nationwide debate on the nature of government and representative institutions, marking the beginning of the Freedom and People's Rights Movement.

Realizing that a political movement required an organized base, Itagaki returned to his native Tosa and founded the Risshisha (Self-Help Society) in April 1874. While initially focused on providing employment and education for the local samurai, the Risshisha quickly evolved into a political organization dedicated to advocating for popular rights and a national assembly. In February 1875, Itagaki took a leading role in establishing a nationwide federation of similar local societies, the Aikokusha (Patriotic Society), in Osaka. However, this first attempt at a national organization quickly collapsed due to a lack of funds and Itagaki's own temporary return to the government. The Aikokusha was successfully revived in 1878, after the suppression of the Satsuma Rebellion, and it became the nucleus for a more widespread and coordinated campaign of political agitation.

=== The Osaka Conference and return to government ===
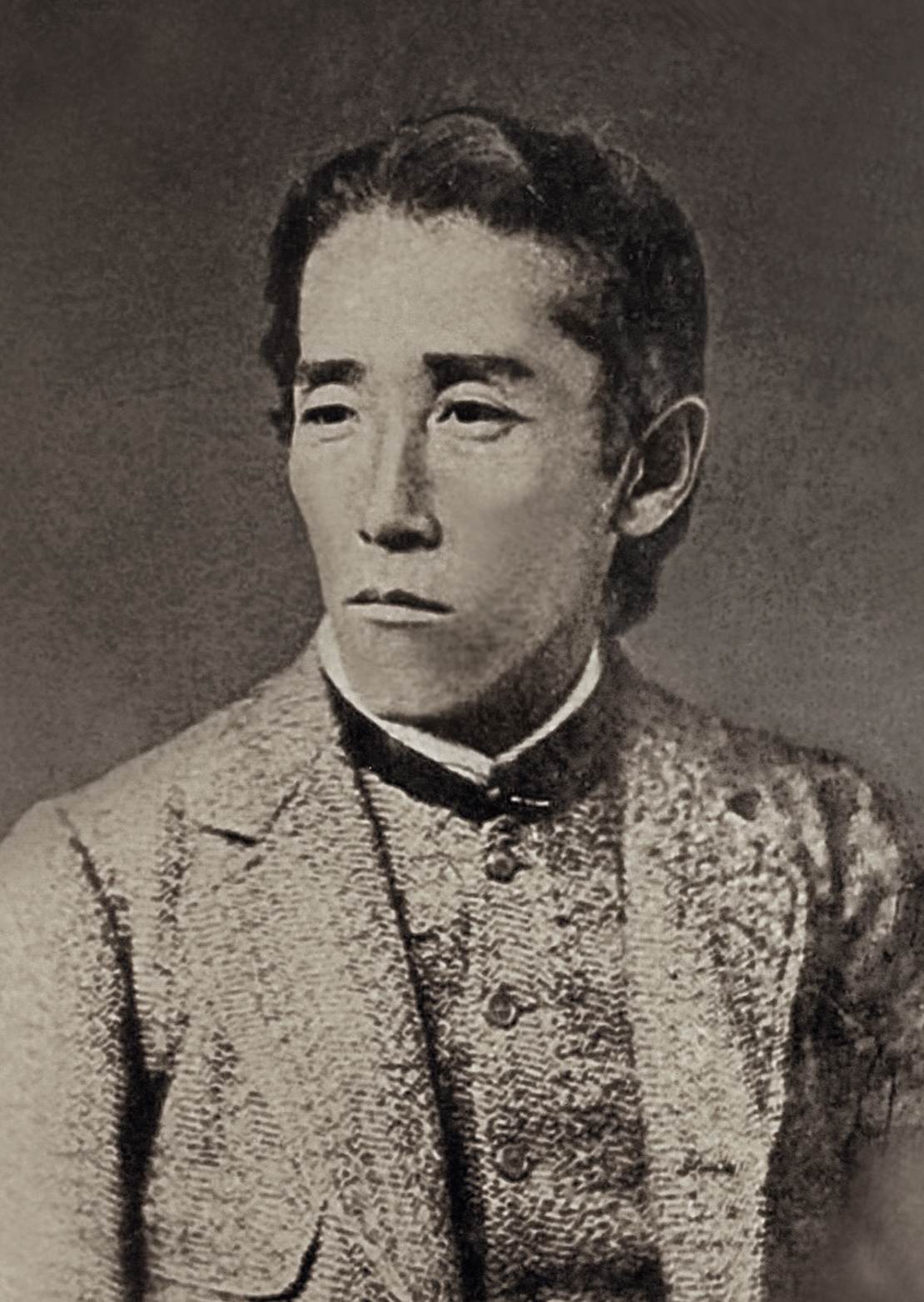
Itagaki in 1880

In 1875, key government leaders, particularly Ōkubo and Kido Takayoshi, sought to strengthen the regime by bringing dissenting figures back into the fold. This led to the Osaka Conference of 1875, where Itagaki was persuaded by Itō Hirobumi and Inoue Kaoru to rejoin the government. Itagaki's return was conditional on the government's acceptance of a gradual move toward constitutional government. The agreement reached at the conference resulted in the creation of the Genrōin (Chamber of Elders), a nominated proto-senate, and the Daishin-in (Supreme Court), as well as an assembly of prefectural governors.

Itagaki served once again as a sangi, but his tenure was short-lived. He found himself at odds with his more conservative colleagues over the interpretation of the Osaka agreement and the limited scope of the new institutions. He resigned in October 1875, concluding that he could not effectively work for his goals from within the oligarchy.

== Leader of the Jiyūtō (Liberal Party) ==
=== Formation and platform ===
Following the Imperial Rescript of 1881, which promised the establishment of a national assembly by 1890, the democratic movement entered a new phase focused on the formation of political parties. Seizing the momentum, Itagaki and his followers transformed the League for the Establishment of a National Assembly into the Liberal Party (Jiyūtō), which was officially founded on 29 October 1881, with Itagaki as its president. The Jiyūtō was Japan's first modern political party and was composed of a loose network of rural political societies. Its prospectus, written mainly by Nakae Chōmin, declared, "Liberty is the natural state of man and the preservation of liberty is man's great duty". A stern warrior leader, Itagaki became an effective public speaker and the symbol of the movement. The party drew its main support from rural landowners, who were resentful of the government's fiscal policies, particularly the heavy land tax.

=== Assassination attempt and European tour ===
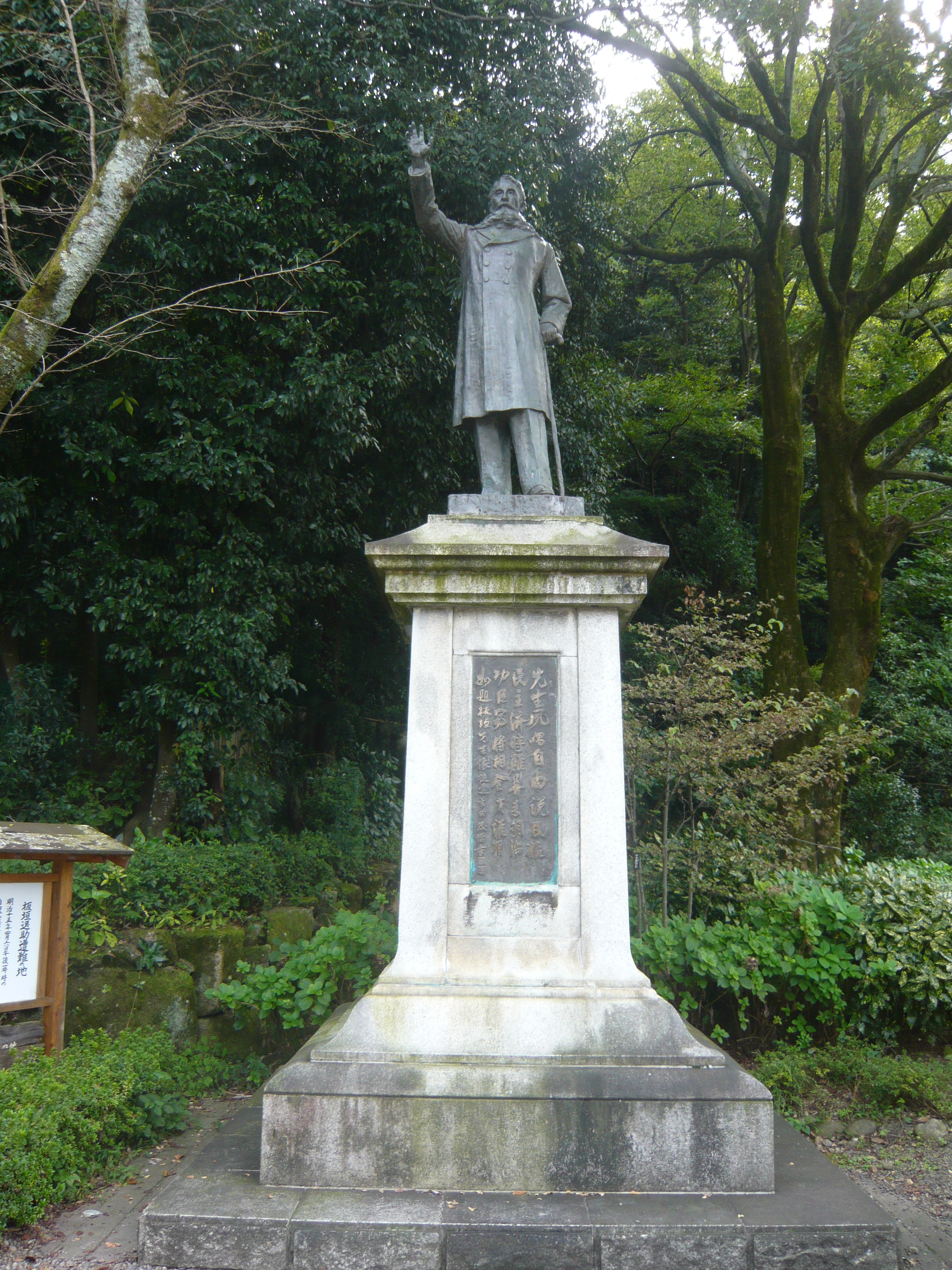
Monument in Gifu marking the site of the 1882 assassination attempt on Itagaki

The growing radicalism of the democratic movement and the government's repressive measures created a highly charged political atmosphere. On 6 April 1882, while giving a speech in Gifu, Itagaki was attacked and stabbed by a would-be assassin, an elementary school teacher who felt Itagaki was a traitor. He survived the attack, and the incident was widely reported to have prompted his famous declaration: "Itagaki may die, but liberty will not!" (板垣死すとも自由は死せず, Itagaki shisutomo, jiyū wa shisezu). Immediately after the stabbing, local doctors—aware of the governor of Gifu's anti-Jiyūtō stance—refused to treat Itagaki, fearing they would be stigmatised; he was instead treated by Gotō Shimpei. The event elevated Itagaki's status as a heroic leader of the democratic cause.

While convalescing, Itagaki, together with Gotō Shōjirō, was persuaded by the government to undertake a tour of Europe from November 1882 to June 1883 to study constitutional systems. While in London, Itagaki met with the philosopher Herbert Spencer, who advised him that Japan should not rush into constitutional reform. The trip was widely seen as an attempt by the government to remove Itagaki from the Japanese political scene at a critical time. It was controversially funded by the Mitsui company, a firm with close government ties, which led to accusations that Itagaki had been bought off. This sparked a bitter conflict between the Jiyūtō and its rival, the Rikken Kaishintō led by Ōkuma Shigenobu, which accused Itagaki of betraying the movement. The dispute discredited both parties and undermined the unity of the opposition.

=== Internal conflict and dissolution ===
During Itagaki's absence, the Jiyūtō was plagued by internal dissent and growing radicalism. The severe economic depression of the early 1880s, caused by the government's deflationary policies, impoverished many of the party's rural supporters. This led to a series of local peasant uprisings, such as the Fukushima incident of 1882 and the Chichibu incident of 1884, in which some radicalized Jiyūtō members were involved. The violence associated with these incidents created a deep rift within the party between its landowning leadership and its impoverished rural base. Faced with increasing government suppression, internal divisions, and the radicalization of its rank-and-file members, the Jiyūtō leadership decided to dissolve the party on 29 October 1884.

== Later career ==
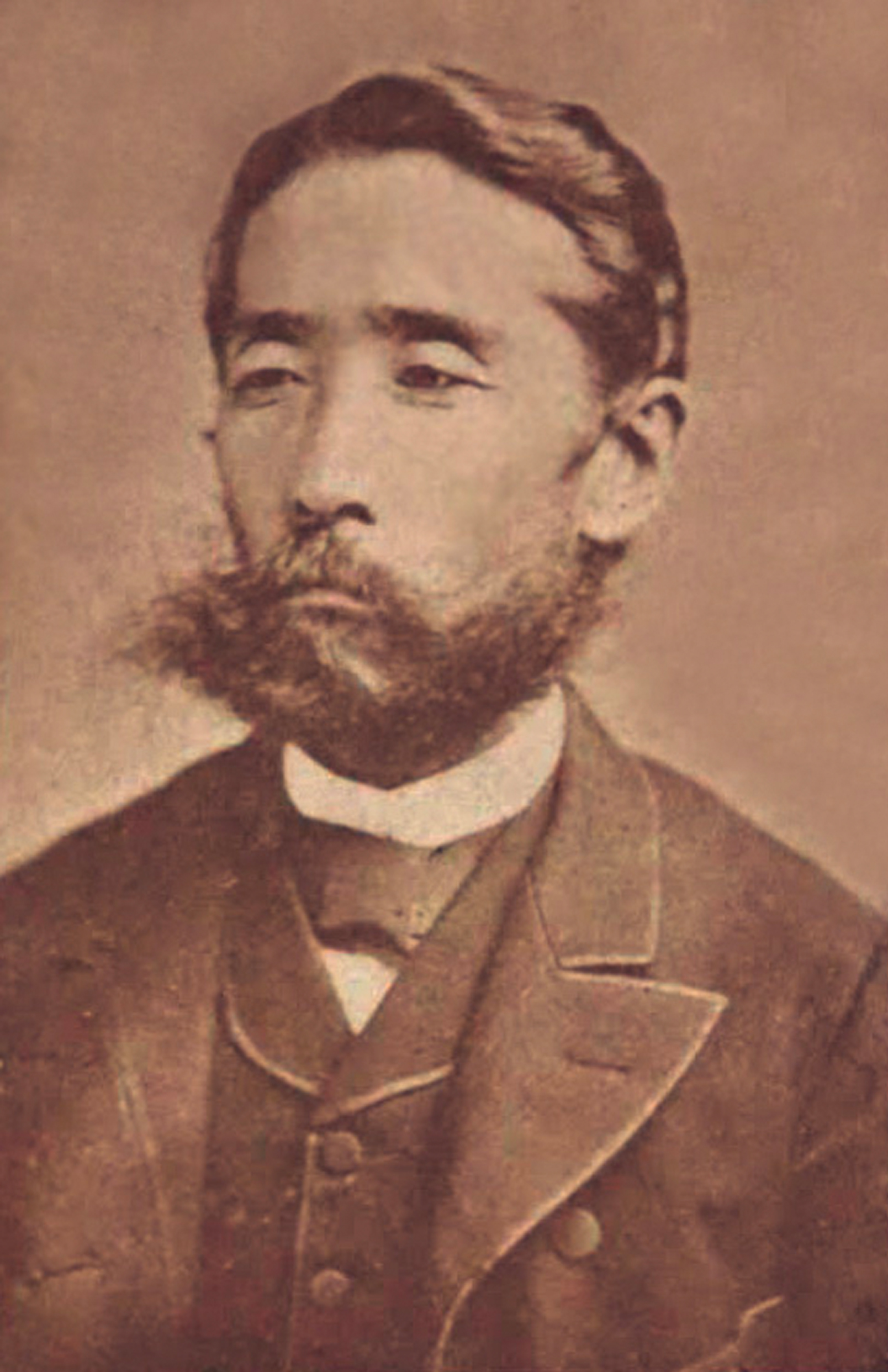
Itagaki in 1886

After the promulgation of the Meiji Constitution in 1889 and the opening of the Imperial Diet in 1890, Itagaki continued to be a major figure in Japanese politics. The Liberal Party, led by Itagaki, was reestablished shortly in 1890 before the opening of the Diet as the Rikken Jiyūtō, soon after renamed the Jiyūtō.

=== Service in the Itō cabinet ===
Itagaki's influence and the strength of his former Jiyūtō followers in the Diet made him a key figure for the Meiji oligarchs, who struggled to control a majority in the House of Representatives. In 1896, during the second Itō cabinet, Itagaki was appointed Minister of Home Affairs. His entry into the cabinet was the result of a coalition between Itō and the Jiyūtō to secure the passage of the budget and other government legislation. As a condition of joining, Itagaki had to formally leave the party, though he retained his influence over it. His tenure was short, however, as he resigned in late 1896 over disagreements with Itō regarding cabinet appointments and political strategy.

=== The Kenseitō and the first party cabinet ===
In June 1898, Itagaki's Liberal Party merged with Ōkuma's Progressive Party (Shimpotō) to form the Constitutional Party (Kenseitō). Facing a parliamentary impasse after refusing to give Itagaki a cabinet seat in his third government, Prime Minister Itō Hirobumi resigned and recommended that Ōkuma and Itagaki be appointed to form the next government. On 30 June 1898, the Ōkuma–Itagaki cabinet, Japan's first party-based government, was formed, with Ōkuma as Prime Minister and Foreign Minister, and Itagaki as Minister of Home Affairs.

The cabinet was short-lived. Emperor Meiji observed that the two leaders had little control over their own party members, who constantly harassed them for positions and favours. Itagaki expressed the difficulties of dealing with the entrenched bureaucracy: "The present Government officials are in their nature a political party supported by the strong clans, and they are a very powerful body. The subordinates are in a position to rule their heads." The cabinet collapsed in just four months due to internal strife, particularly over Education Minister Ozaki Yukio's controversial speech alluding to the possibility of a Japanese republic. Pressured by conservative factions and the military, Itagaki denounced Ozaki to the emperor. When Ōkuma defended Ozaki and appointed a replacement without consulting the former Jiyūtō faction, Itagaki resigned on 27 October 1898. His resignation, followed by those of his supporters, led to the fall of the cabinet. After the cabinet's collapse, the Kenseitō split into two parties, with Itagaki's faction retaining the Kenseitō name while Ōkuma's faction formed the Kensei Hontō. Itagaki's Kenseitō would later become the basis for the Rikken Seiyūkai, founded by Itō Hirobumi in 1900. Itagaki retired from public life in 1900 and died on 16 July 1919.

== Political views and legacy ==
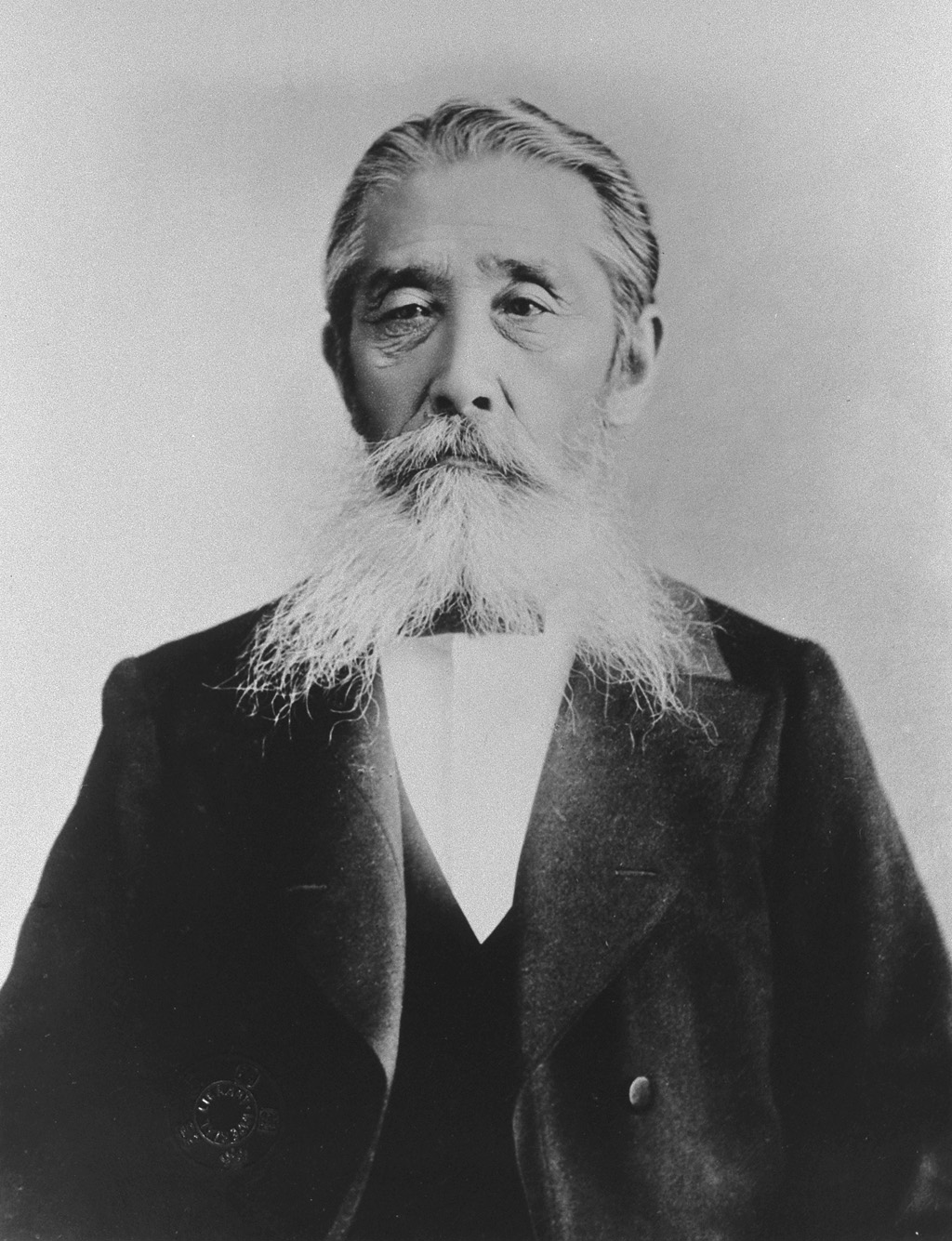
Itagaki c. 1910s

Itagaki Taisuke's political career embodies the complexities and contradictions of Japan's early democratic movement. While he is celebrated as a champion of liberty and representative government, his political thought evolved over time and was not always consistently liberal. Initially, his vision for a representative assembly was elitist; the 1874 memorial suggested that the franchise be limited to the samurai and the wealthier farmers and merchants, who he believed had "produced the leaders of the revolution of 1868." This reflected the samurai-led origins of the movement and its initial concern with the status of a disaffected elite.

However, as the movement grew and absorbed a wider base of support, particularly from the rural gentry and commoners, Itagaki's views appeared to become more populist. His organization of the Jiyūtō as a national party with a broad-based platform was a landmark in Japanese political history. His popularity with commoners was attributed in part to his willingness to speak from the same platform as them, a rarity among ex-samurai of his status. At the same time, he was often criticized by his contemporaries and later historians as a political opportunist who was willing to compromise with the oligarchy and abandon his followers for a post in the government, as he did in 1875.

Despite these contradictions, Itagaki's primary legacy is his role as the central figure in the Freedom and People's Rights Movement. By channelling the discontent of various groups into a political movement that called for a constitution and a national assembly, he played a crucial part in compelling the Meiji oligarchs to move toward constitutional government. His decision to pursue his goals through political organization and agitation, rather than armed rebellion, set a precedent for non-violent opposition in modern Japan and laid the foundations for the country's party system.

== Honors ==
=== Peerages ===
- Count (9 May 1887)

=== Decorations ===
- Grand Cordon of the Order of the Rising Sun (29 September 1896)
- Grand Cordon of the Order of the Rising Sun with Paulownia Flowers (16 July 1919; posthumous)

Political offices
Preceded by Yoshikawa Akimasa	Home Minister; 14 April 1896 – 20 September 1896	Succeeded by Kabayama Sukenori
Preceded by Yoshikawa Akimasa	Home Minister; 30 June 1898 – 8 November 1898	Succeeded by Saigō Tsugumichi
