= Liberal Party (Japan, 1881) =

Japanese political parties

The Jiyūtō (自由党, "Liberal Party") is the name of several liberal political parties in the history of Japan, two of which existed in the Empire of Japan prior to 1945.

== Liberal Party of 1881 ==
The first Liberal Party of Japan was formed on October 18, 1881, by Itagaki Taisuke and other members of the Freedom and People's Rights Movement (League for the Establishment of a National Assembly) to agitate for the establishment of a national assembly, with a membership based on the ideals of liberal democracy under a constitutional monarchy. It attracted a wide following of former samurai who were discontent because they were no longer an elite class and no longer received stipends from the government. The Jiyūtō also aimed for suffrage for samurai and an elected assembly in each prefecture. Itagaki was party president, with Nakajima Nobuyuki as vice-president. Other notable members included Gotō Shōjirō, Baba Tatsui, Tetchō Suehiro, Ueki Emori, and Nakae Chōmin.

The Meiji government viewed the growth of the Jiyūtō with misgivings, suspecting it of harboring tendencies towards republicanism. The party was also made vulnerable due to peasant uprisings in rural areas led or inspired by local Jiyūtō members. The Jiyūtō voted to dissolve itself on October 29, 1884, on the eve of the Chichibu Incident.

In 1887, Gotō Shojirō regrouped some members of the former Jiyūtō into a proto-party called the Daidō Danketsu Movement. The Daidō Danketsu split into two groups (Daidō Club led by Kōno Hironaka and Daidō Kyōwakai led by Ōi Kentarō and Nakae Chōmin ) in March 1889. In 1890, they were merged by Itagaki Taisuke to form the Constitutional Liberal Party, which was later renamed the Liberal Party. Some politicians who supported Gotō didn't join this party and formed National Liberal Party.

== See also ==
- Liberalism worldwide
- List of liberal parties
- Liberalism in Japan
