= Kuroda cabinet =

Japanese cabinet from 1888 to 1889

Kuroda Cabinet
- 2nd Cabinet of Japan
- 1888–1889
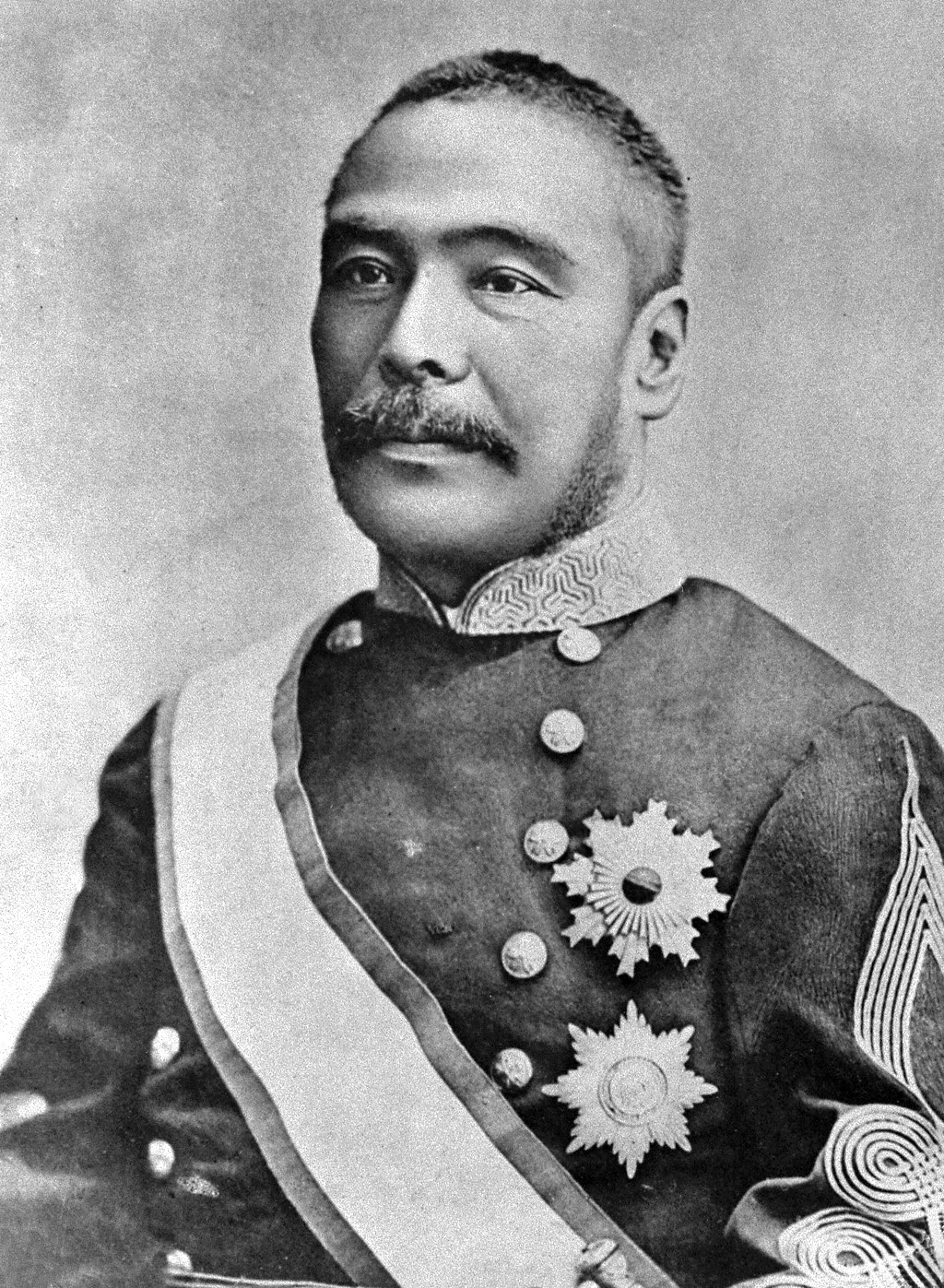
- Prime Minister Kuroda Kiyotaka
- Date formed: April 30, 1888
- Date dissolved: October 25, 1889

People and organisations
- Emperor: Meiji
- Prime Minister: Kuroda Kiyotaka
- Total no. of members: 14
- Member party: Meiji oligarchy

History
- Predecessor: First Itō Cabinet
- Successor: Sanjō caretaker cabinet

The Kuroda Cabinet is the second Cabinet of Japan led by Kuroda Kiyotaka from April 30, 1888 to October 25, 1889. It was the first in the series of "transcendental cabinets" (Japanese: 超然内閣, romanized: Chōzen naikaku) ostensibly standing above political parties and accountable only to the Japanese Emperor, not the National Diet.

== Cabinet ==
Kuroda Cabinet
Portfolio	Minister	Political party	Term start	Term end
Prime Minister	Count Kuroda Kiyotaka	Independent	April 30, 1888	October 25, 1889
Minister for Foreign Affairs	Count Ōkuma Shigenobu	Independent	April 30, 1888	October 25, 1889
Minister of Home Affairs	Count Yamagata Aritomo	Military (Army)	April 30, 1888	October 25, 1889
Minister of Home Affairs	Count Matsukata Masayoshi (acting)	Independent	December 3, 1888	October 3, 1889
Minister of Finance	Count Matsukata Masayoshi	Independent	April 30, 1888	October 25, 1889
Minister of the Army	Count Ōyama Iwao	Military (Army)	April 30, 1888	October 25, 1889
Minister of the Navy	Count Saigō Jūdō	Military (Navy)	April 30, 1888	October 25, 1889
Minister of Justice	Count Yamada Akiyoshi	Military (Army)	April 30, 1888	October 25, 1889
Minister of Education	Viscount Mori Arinori	Independent	April 30, 1888	February 12, 1889
Minister of Education	Vacant		February 12, 1889	February 16, 1889
Minister of Education	Count Ōyama Iwao (acting)	Military (Army)	February 16, 1889	March 22, 1889
Minister of Education	Viscount Enomoto Takeaki	Military (Navy)	March 22, 1889	October 25, 1889
Minister of Agriculture and Commerce	Viscount Enomoto Takeaki (acting)	Military (Navy)	April 30, 1888	July 25, 1888
Minister of Agriculture and Commerce	Count Inoue Kaoru	Independent	July 25, 1888	October 25, 1889
Minister of Communications	Viscount Enomoto Takeaki	Military (Navy)	April 30, 1888	March 22, 1889
Minister of Communications	Count Gotō Shōjirō	Independent	March 22, 1889	October 25, 1889
Minister without portfolio	Count Itō Hirobumi	Independent	April 30, 1888	October 25, 1889
Chief Cabinet Secretary	Komaki Masanari	Independent	May 28, 1888	October 25, 1889
Director-General of the Cabinet Legislation Bureau	Inoue Kowashi	Independent	May 28, 1888	October 25, 1889

== Sources ==
- Hunter, Janet (1984). "Kuroda Cabinet". Concise Dictionary of Modern Japanese History. University of California Press. p. 267. ISBN 978-0-520-04390-9.

Preceded by First Itō Cabinet	Cabinet of Japan; 1888–1889	Succeeded by Sanjō caretaker cabinet
