= Sanjō caretaker cabinet =

Cabinet of Japan in 1889

- Caretaker Cabinet of Japan
- October – December 1889
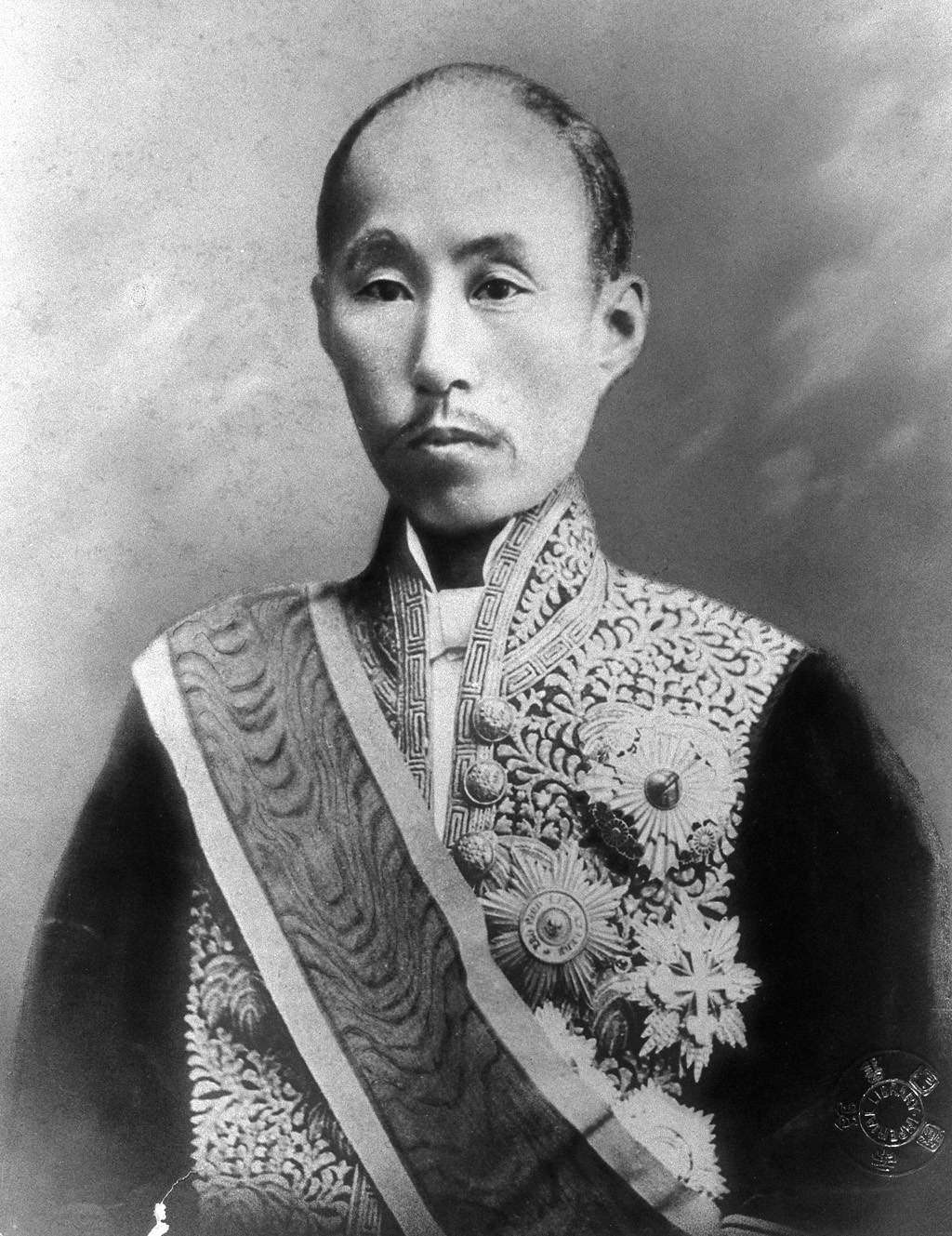
- Prime Minister Sanjō Sanetomi
- Date formed: October 25, 1889
- Date dissolved: December 24, 1889

People and organisations
- Emperor: Meiji
- Prime Minister: Sanjō Sanetomi
- Total no. of members: 13

History
- Predecessor: Kuroda Cabinet
- Successor: First Yamagata Cabinet

The Sanjō caretaker cabinet is a caretaker Cabinet of Japan led by Sanjō Sanetomi from October 25, 1889, to December 24, 1889.

== Cabinet ==
Sanjō caretaker cabinet
Portfolio	Minister	Political party	Term start	Term end
Prime Minister	Prince Sanjō Sanetomi	Independent	October 25, 1889	December 24, 1889
Minister for Foreign Affairs	Count Ōkuma Shigenobu	Independent	October 25, 1889	December 24, 1889
Minister of Home Affairs	Count Yamagata Aritomo	Military (Army)	October 25, 1889	December 24, 1889
Minister of Finance	Count Matsukata Masayoshi	Independent	October 25, 1889	December 24, 1889
Minister of the Army	Count Ōyama Iwao	Military (Army)	October 25, 1889	December 24, 1889
Minister of the Navy	Count Saigō Jūdō	Military (Navy)	October 25, 1889	December 24, 1889
Minister of Justice	Count Yamada Akiyoshi	Military (Army)	October 25, 1889	December 24, 1889
Minister of Education	Viscount Enomoto Takeaki	Military (Navy)	October 25, 1889	December 24, 1889
Minister of Agriculture and Commerce	Count Inoue Kaoru	Independent	October 25, 1889	December 23, 1889
Minister of Agriculture and Commerce	Vacant		December 23, 1889	December 24, 1889
Minister of Communications	Count Gotō Shōjirō	Independent	October 25, 1889	December 24, 1889
Minister without portfolio	Count Itō Hirobumi	Independent	October 25, 1889	October 30, 1889
Chief Cabinet Secretary	Komaki Masanari	Independent	October 25, 1889	December 24, 1889
Director-General of the Cabinet Legislation Bureau	Inoue Kowashi	Independent	October 25, 1889	December 24, 1889

Preceded by Kuroda Cabinet	Cabinet of Japan; 1889	Succeeded by First Yamagata Cabinet
