= First Itō cabinet =

Japanese cabinet from 1885 to 1888

First Itō Cabinet
- 1st Cabinet of Japan
- 1885–1888
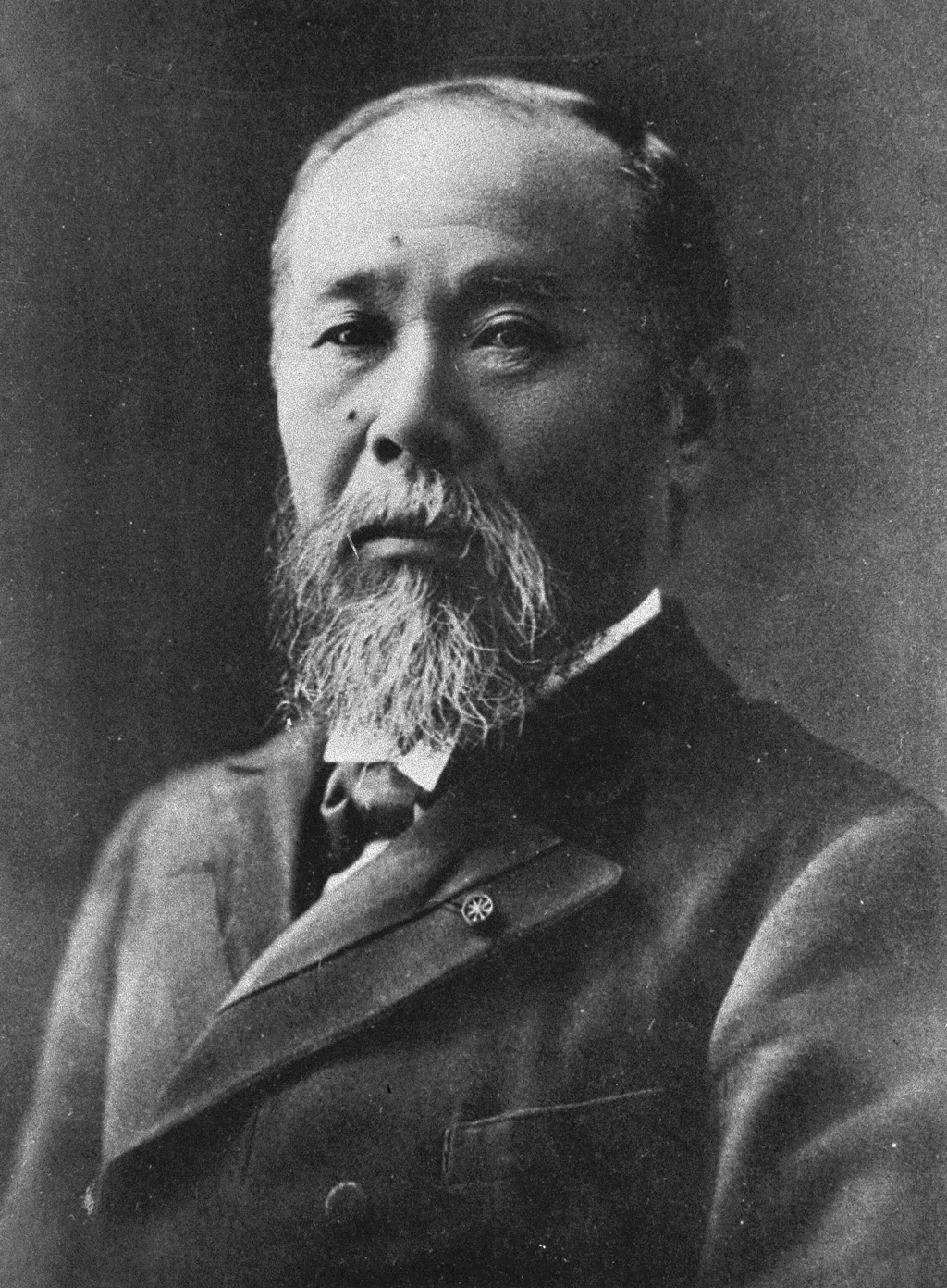
- Prime Minister Itō Hirobumi
- Date formed: December 22, 1885
- Date dissolved: April 30, 1888

People and organisations
- Emperor: Meiji
- Prime Minister: Itō Hirobumi
- No. of ministers: 16
- Member party: Meiji oligarchy

History
- Successor: Kuroda Cabinet

The First Itō Cabinet is the first Cabinet of Japan led by Itō Hirobumi from December 22, 1885 to April 30, 1888. The cabinet composed of ministry heads replaced the Daijō-kan.

== Cabinet ==
First Itō Cabinet
Portfolio	Minister	Political party	Term start	Term end
Prime Minister	Count Itō Hirobumi	Independent	December 22, 1885	April 30, 1888
Minister for Foreign Affairs	Count Inoue Kaoru	Independent	December 22, 1885	September 17, 1887
Minister for Foreign Affairs	Count Itō Hirobumi (acting)	Independent	September 17, 1887	February 1, 1888
Minister for Foreign Affairs	Count Ōkuma Shigenobu	Independent	February 1, 1888	April 30, 1888
Minister of Home Affairs	Count Yamagata Aritomo	Military (Army)	December 22, 1885	April 30, 1888
Minister of Finance	Count Matsukata Masayoshi	Independent	December 22, 1885	April 30, 1888
Minister of the Army	Count Ōyama Iwao	Military (Army)	December 22, 1885	April 30, 1888
Minister of the Navy	Count Saigō Jūdō	Military (Navy)	December 22, 1885	April 30, 1888
Minister of Justice	Count Yamada Akiyoshi	Military (Army)	December 22, 1885	April 30, 1888
Minister of Education	Viscount Mori Arinori	Independent	December 22, 1885	April 30, 1888
Minister of Agriculture and Commerce	Viscount Tani Tateki	Military (Army)	December 22, 1885	July 26, 1887
Minister of Agriculture and Commerce	Count Saigō Jūdō	Military (Navy)	March 16, 1886	July 10, 1886
Minister of Agriculture and Commerce	Count Yamagata Aritomo (acting)	Military (Army)	July 10, 1886	June 24, 1887
Minister of Agriculture and Commerce	Viscount Hijikata Hisamoto	Independent	July 26, 1887	September 17, 1887
Minister of Agriculture and Commerce	Count Kuroda Kiyotaka	Independent	September 17, 1887	April 30, 1888
Minister of Communications	Viscount Enomoto Takeaki	Military (Navy)	December 22, 1885	April 30, 1888
Chief Cabinet Secretary	Viscount Tanaka Mitsuaki	Independent	December 22, 1885	April 30, 1888
Director-General of the Cabinet Legislation Bureau	Viscount Yamao Yōzō	Independent	December 23, 1885	February 7, 1888
Director-General of the Cabinet Legislation Bureau	Inoue Kowashi	Independent	February 7, 1888	April 30, 1888

Preceded by New (Daijō-kan)	Cabinet of Japan; 1885–1888	Succeeded by Kuroda Cabinet
