= First Yamagata cabinet =

Japanese cabinet from 1889 to 1891

First Yamagata Cabinet
- 3rd Cabinet of Japan
- 1889–1891
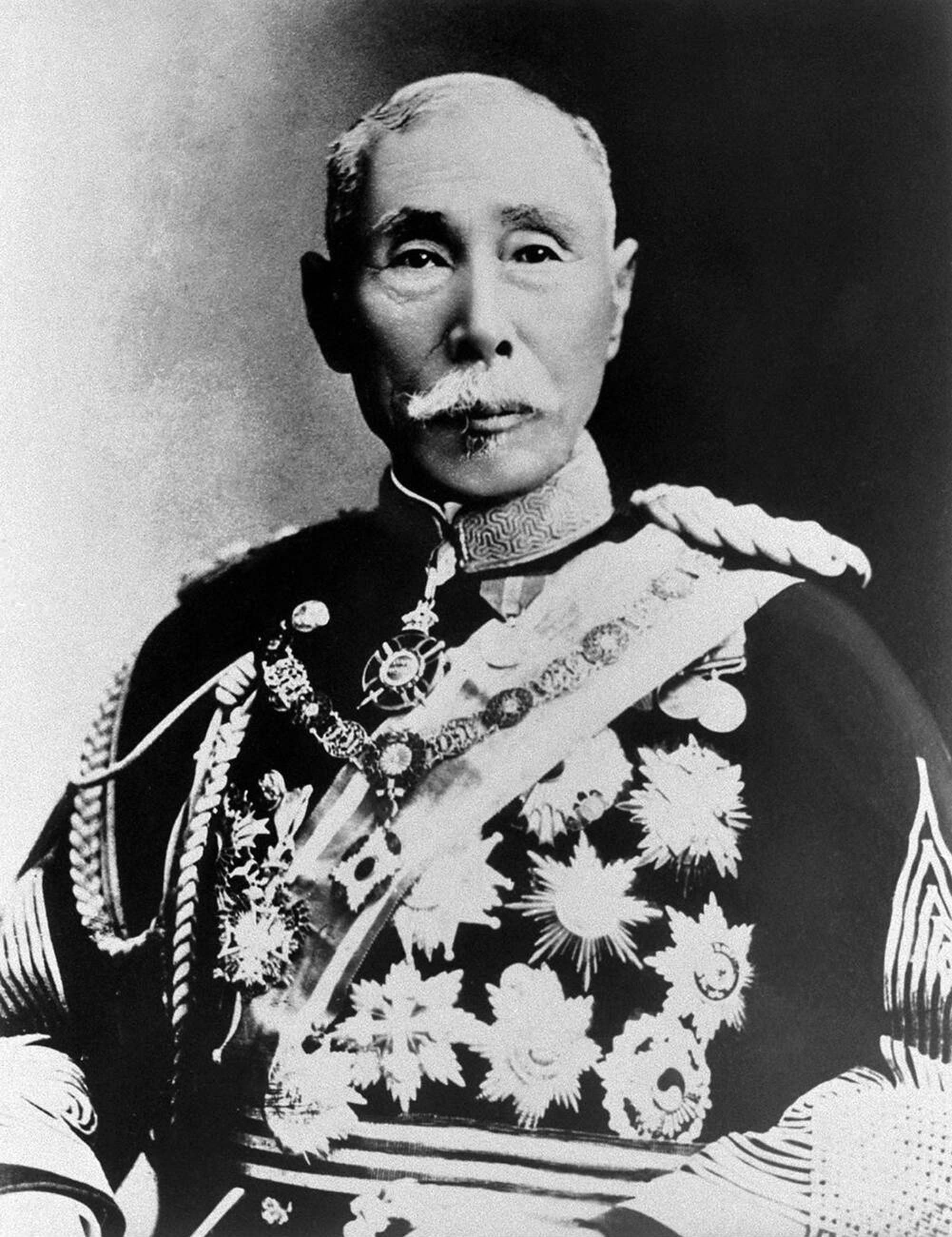
- Prime Minister Yamagata Aritomo
- Date formed: December 24, 1889
- Date dissolved: May 6, 1891

People and organisations
- Emperor: Meiji
- Prime Minister: Yamagata Aritomo
- Total no. of members: 13
- Member party: Meiji oligarchy Taiseikai; Kokumin Jiyutō
- Status in legislature: Minority
- Opposition party: Liberal Party; Rikken Kaishintō

History
- Election: 1890 general election
- Legislature term: 1890–1892
- Predecessor: Sanjō caretaker cabinet
- Successor: First Matsukata Cabinet

The First Yamagata Cabinet is the third Cabinet of Japan led by Yamagata Aritomo from December 24, 1889 to May 6, 1891.

== Cabinet ==
First Yamagata Cabinet
Portfolio	Minister	Political party	Term start	Term end
Prime Minister	Count Yamagata Aritomo	Military (Army)	December 24, 1889	May 6, 1891
Minister for Foreign Affairs	Viscount Aoki Shūzō	Independent	December 24, 1889	May 6, 1891
Minister of Home Affairs	Count Yamagata Aritomo	Military (Army)	December 24, 1889	May 17, 1890
Minister of Home Affairs	Count Saigō Jūdō	Military (Navy)	May 17, 1890	May 6, 1891
Minister of Finance	Count Matsukata Masayoshi	Independent	December 24, 1889	May 6, 1891
Minister of the Army	Count Ōyama Iwao	Military (Army)	December 24, 1889	May 6, 1891
Minister of the Navy	Count Saigō Jūdō	Military (Navy)	December 24, 1889	May 17, 1890
Minister of the Navy	Viscount Kabayama Sukenori	Military (Navy)	May 17, 1890	May 6, 1891
Minister of Justice	Count Yamada Akiyoshi	Military (Army)	December 24, 1889	May 6, 1891
Minister of Education	Viscount Enomoto Takeaki	Military (Navy)	December 24, 1889	May 17, 1890
Minister of Education	Yoshikawa Akimasa	Independent	May 17, 1890	May 6, 1891
Minister of Agriculture and Commerce	Iwamura Michitoshi	Independent	December 24, 1889	May 17, 1890
Minister of Agriculture and Commerce	Mutsu Munemitsu	Independent	May 17, 1890	May 6, 1891
Minister of Communications	Count Gotō Shōjirō	Independent	December 24, 1889	May 6, 1891
Minister without portfolio	Count Ōki Takatō	Independent	December 24, 1889	May 6, 1891
Chief Cabinet Secretary	Baron Sufu Kohei	Independent	December 24, 1889	May 6, 1891
Director-General of the Cabinet Legislation Bureau	Inoue Kowashi	Independent	December 24, 1889	May 6, 1891

Preceded by Sanjō caretaker cabinet	Cabinet of Japan; 1889–1891	Succeeded by First Matsukata Cabinet
