= Matsukata Cabinet =

Matsukata Cabinet may refer to:

- First Matsukata Cabinet, the Japanese government led by Matsukata Masayoshi from 1891 to 1892
- Second Matsukata Cabinet, the Japanese government led by Matsukata Masayoshi from 1896 to 1898
