= First Matsukata cabinet =

Japanese cabinet from 1891 to 1892

First Matsukata Cabinet
- 4th Cabinet of Japan
- 1891–1892
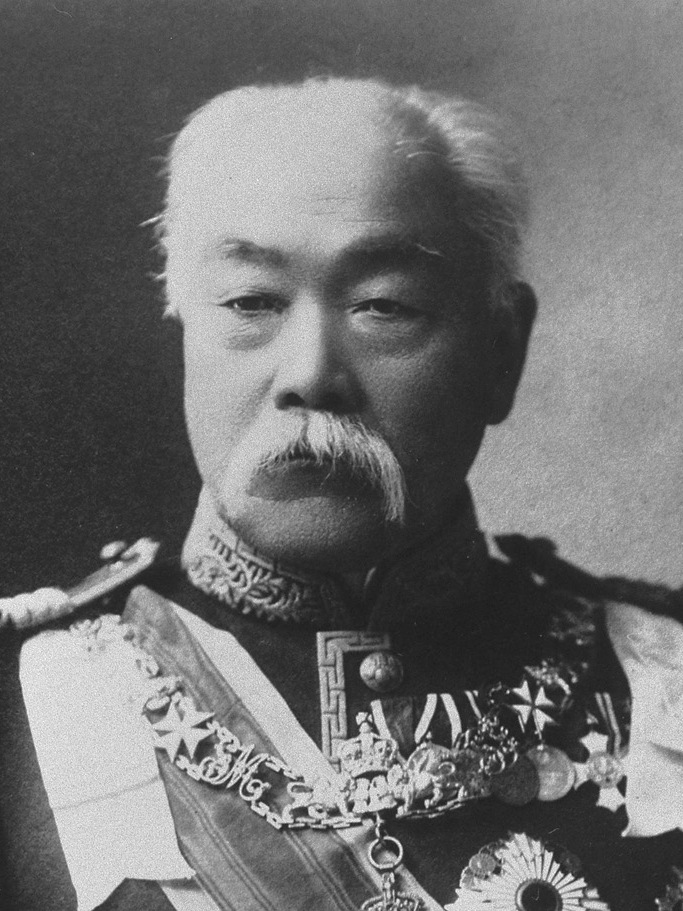
- Prime Minister Matsukata Masayoshi
- Date formed: May 6, 1891
- Date dissolved: August 8, 1892

People and organisations
- Emperor: Meiji
- Prime Minister: Matsukata Masayoshi
- Total no. of members: 22
- Member party: Meiji oligarchy Chuo Club; Dokuritsu Club; Kinki Club
- Status in legislature: Minority
- Opposition party: Liberal Party; Rikken Kaishintō

History
- Election: 1892 general election
- Legislature terms: 1890–1892; 1892–March 1894
- Predecessor: First Yamagata Cabinet
- Successor: Second Itō Cabinet

The First Matsukata Cabinet is the fourth Cabinet of Japan led by Matsukata Masayoshi from May 6, 1891, to August 8, 1892.

== Cabinet ==
First Matsukata Cabinet
Portfolio	Minister	Political party	Term start	Term end
Prime Minister	Count Matsukata Masayoshi	Independent	May 6, 1891	August 8, 1892
Minister for Foreign Affairs	Viscount Aoki Shūzō	Independent	May 6, 1891	May 29, 1891
Minister for Foreign Affairs	Viscount Enomoto Takeaki	Military (Navy)	May 29, 1891	August 8, 1892
Minister of Home Affairs	Count Saigō Jūdō	Military (Navy)	May 6, 1891	June 1, 1891
Minister of Home Affairs	Viscount Shinagawa Yajirō	Independent	June 1, 1891	March 11, 1892
Minister of Home Affairs	Count Soejima Taneomi	Independent	March 11, 1892	June 8, 1892
Minister of Home Affairs	Count Matsukata Masayoshi (acting)	Independent	June 8, 1892	July 14, 1892
Minister of Home Affairs	Kōno Togama	Rikken Kaishintō	July 14, 1892	August 8, 1892
Minister of Finance	Count Matsukata Masayoshi	Independent	May 6, 1891	August 8, 1892
Minister of the Army	Count Ōyama Iwao	Military (Army)	May 6, 1891	May 17, 1891
Minister of the Army	Viscount Takashima Tomonosuke	Military (Army)	May 17, 1891	August 8, 1892
Minister of the Navy	Viscount Kabayama Sukenori	Military (Navy)	May 6, 1891	August 8, 1892
Minister of Justice	Count Yamada Akiyoshi	Military (Army)	May 6, 1891	June 1, 1891
Minister of Justice	Viscount Tanaka Fujimaro	Independent	June 1, 1891	June 23, 1892
Minister of Justice	Kōno Togama	Rikken Kaishintō	June 23, 1892	August 8, 1892
Minister of Education	Yoshikawa Akimasa	Independent	May 6, 1891	June 1, 1891
Minister of Education	Count Ōki Takatō	Independent	June 1, 1891	August 8, 1892
Minister of Agriculture and Commerce	Mutsu Munemitsu	Independent	May 6, 1891	March 14, 1892
Minister of Agriculture and Commerce	Kōno Togama	Rikken Kaishintō	March 14, 1892	July 14, 1892
Minister of Agriculture and Commerce	Viscount Sano Tsunetami	Independent	July 14, 1892	August 8, 1892
Minister of Communications	Count Gotō Shōjirō	Independent	May 6, 1891	August 8, 1892
Minister without portfolio	Count Ōki Takatō	Independent	May 6, 1891	June 1, 1891
Chief Cabinet Secretary	Baron Sufu Kohei	Independent	May 6, 1891	June 15, 1891
Chief Cabinet Secretary	Hirayama Narinobu	Independent	June 16, 1891	August 8, 1892
Director-General of the Cabinet Legislation Bureau	Inoue Kowashi	Independent	May 6, 1891	May 8, 1891
Director-General of the Cabinet Legislation Bureau	Vacant		May 8, 1891	June 10, 1891
Director-General of the Cabinet Legislation Bureau	Saburo Ozaki	Independent	June 10, 1891	August 8, 1892

Preceded by First Yamagata Cabinet	Cabinet of Japan; 1891–1892	Succeeded by Second Itō Cabinet
