= Itō Cabinet =

Itō Cabinet may refer to:

- First Itō Cabinet, the Japanese government led by Itō Hirobumi from 1885 to 1888
- Second Itō Cabinet, the Japanese government led by Itō Hirobumi from 1892 to 1896
- Third Itō Cabinet, the Japanese government led by Itō Hirobumi in 1898
- Fourth Itō Cabinet, the Japanese government led by Itō Hirobumi from 1900 to 1901
