= Gotō Shōjirō =

Japanese samurai and politician (1838-1897)

Senior Second Rank Count Gotō Shōjirō
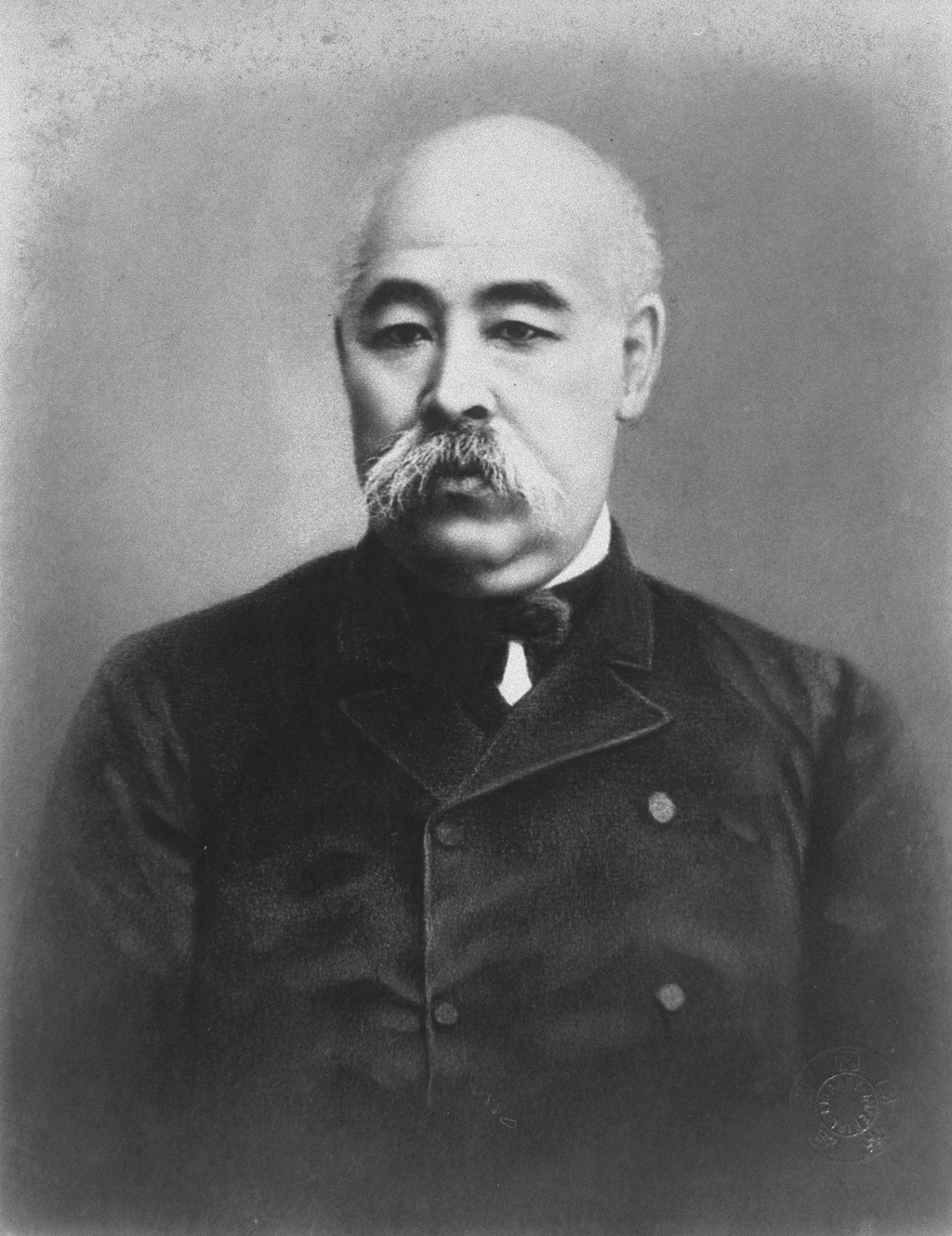

Minister of Agriculture and Commerce
- In office 8 August 1892 – 22 January 1894
- Prime Minister: Itō Hirobumi
- Preceded by: Sano Tsunetami
- Succeeded by: Enomoto Takeaki

Minister of Communications
- In office 22 March 1889 – 8 August 1892
- Prime Minister: Kuroda Kiyotaka; Yamagata Aritomo; Matsukata Masayoshi
- Preceded by: Enomoto Takeaki
- Succeeded by: Kuroda Kiyotaka

Vice Chairman of the Genrōin
- In office 28 April 1875 – 28 March 1876
- Chairman: Vacant
- Preceded by: Position established
- Succeeded by: Kōno Togama

Member of the Genrōin
- In office 25 April 1875 – 28 April 1875

Governor of Osaka Prefecture
- In office 23 May 1868 – 24 January 1870
- Monarch: Meiji
- Preceded by: Tadaosa Daigo
- Succeeded by: Yuri Kimimasa

Personal details
- Born: 13 April 1838 Kōchi, Tosa, Japan
- Died: 4 August 1897 (aged 59) Hakone, Kanagawa, Japan
- Resting place: Aoyama Cemetery
- Party: Jiyūto
- Children: Gotō Taketarō
- Relatives: Iwasaki Yanosuke (son-in-law); Ōe Taku (son-in-law)

Japanese name
- Kanji: 後藤 象二郎
- Hiragana: ごとう しょうじろう
Transcriptions
- Romanization: Gotō Shōjirō

Count Gotō Shōjirō (後藤 象二郎; 13 April 1838 – 4 August 1897) was a Japanese samurai and politician during the Bakumatsu and early Meiji period of Japanese history. He was a leader of Freedom and People's Rights Movement (自由民権運動, jiyū minken undō) which would evolve into a political party.

== Early life ==
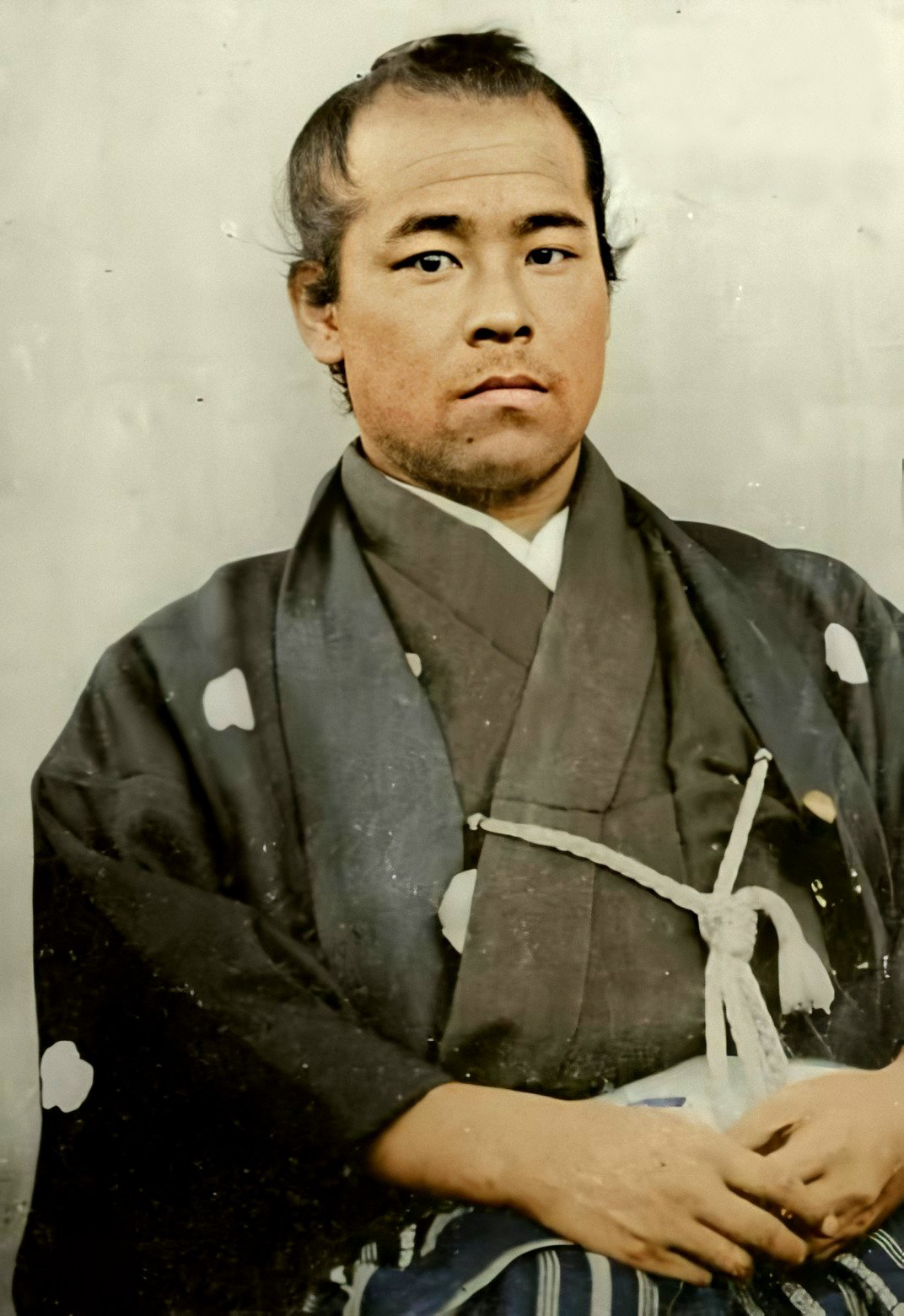
Shojiro as a feudal retainer of the Tosa Domain

Gotō was born in Tosa Domain (present day Kōchi Prefecture). Together with fellow Tosa samurai Sakamoto Ryōma, he was attracted by the radical pro-Imperial Sonnō jōi movement. After being promoted, he essentially seized power within the Tosa Domain's politics and exerted influence on Tosa daimyō Yamauchi Toyoshige to call on shōgun Tokugawa Yoshinobu to return power peacefully to the Emperor.

== Meiji statesman and liberal agitator ==
After the Meiji Restoration, Gotō was appointed to a number of posts, including that of Governor of Osaka, and sangi (councillor), but later left the Meiji government in 1873 over disagreement with the government's policy of restraint toward Korea (i.e. the Seikanron debate) and, more generally, in opposition to the Chōshū-Satsuma domination of the new government. Jointly with Itagaki Taisuke, he submitted a memorandum calling for the establishment of a popularly elected parliament. In 1874, together with Itagaki Taisuke, and Etō Shinpei and Soejima Taneomi of Hizen Province, he formed the Aikoku Kōtō (Public Party of Patriots), declaring, "We, the thirty millions of people in Japan are all equally endowed with certain definite rights, among which are those of enjoying and defending life and liberty, acquiring and possessing property, and obtaining a livelihood and pursuing happiness. These rights are by Nature bestowed upon all men, and, therefore, cannot be taken away by the power of any man." This anti-government stance appealed to the discontented remnants of the samurai class and the rural aristocracy (who resented centralized taxation) and peasants (who were discontented with high prices and low wages).

After the Osaka Conference of 1875, he returned briefly to the government, participating in the Genrōin. He also managed a coal mine in Kyūshū (the Takashima Coal Mine), but finding it to be losing money, sold his interest to Iwasaki Yatarō.

In 1881, he returned to politics, assisting Itagaki Taisuke found the Jiyūto (Liberal Party) which developed the daidō danketsu (coalition) movement in 1887.

== Meiji bureaucrat ==
In 1889, Gotō joined the Kuroda Cabinet as Communications Minister, remaining in that post under the First Yamagata Cabinet and First Matsukata Cabinet. Under the new kazoku peerage system, he was elevated to hakushaku (count). In the Second Itō Cabinet he became Agriculture and Commerce minister. He was implicated in a scandal involving futures trading, and was forced to retire. After a heart attack, he retired to his summer home in Hakone, Kanagawa, where he died in 1896. His grave is at the Aoyama Cemetery in Tokyo.

== Notes ==
Political offices
Preceded by Sano Tsunetami	Minister of Agriculture & Commerce; August 1892 – January 1894	Succeeded by Enomoto Takeaki
Preceded by Enomoto Takeaki	Minister of Communications; March 1889 – August 1892	Succeeded by Kuroda Kiyotaka
