= Watanabe Kunitake =

Japanese politician (1846–1919)

Senior Second Rank Viscount Watanabe Kunitake
- 渡辺 国武
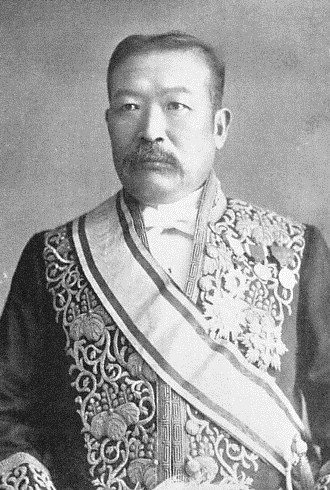

Minister of Finance
- In office 19 October 1900 – 14 May 1901
- Prime Minister: Itō Hirobumi
- Preceded by: Matsukata Masayoshi
- Succeeded by: Saionji Kinmochi (acting); Sone Arasuke
- In office 27 August 1895 – 18 September 1896
- Prime Minister: Itō Hirobumi
- Preceded by: Matsukata Masayoshi
- Succeeded by: Matsukata Masayoshi
- In office 8 August 1892 – 17 March 1895
- Prime Minister: Itō Hirobumi
- Preceded by: Matsukata Masayoshi
- Succeeded by: Matsukata Masayoshi

Minister of Communications
- In office 17 March 1895 – 9 October 1895
- Prime Minister: Itō Hirobumi
- Preceded by: Kuroda Kiyotaka
- Succeeded by: Shirane Sen'ichi
Gubernatorial offices
Governor of Fukuoka Prefecture
In office 12 August 1881 – 11 May 1882
Monarch	Meiji
Preceded by	Kiyoshi Watanabe
Succeeded by	Kishira Shunsuke
Governor of Tokushima Prefecture
In office 1876–1879
Monarch	Meiji
Preceded by	Keimei Tomioka
Succeeded by	Kunimichi Kitagaki
Governor of Kōchi Prefecture
In office 26 August 1876 – 7 June 1879
Monarch	Meiji
Preceded by	Iwasaki Nagatake
Succeeded by	Kunimichi Kitagaki

Personal details
- Born: 29 March 1846 Okaya, Shinano, Japan
- Died: 11 May 1919 (aged 73) Izusan, Shizuoka Japan
- Party: Rikken Seiyūkai
- Other party: Independent (1876–1900)
- Relatives: Takeshi Watanabe (grandson)

Viscount Watanabe Kunitake (渡辺 国武; 29 March 1846 – 11 May 1919) was a Japanese politician, cabinet minister and deputy prime minister, who lived in the Meiji and Taishō periods. Noted primarily for his role as finance minister, he was also the younger brother of Count Watanabe Chiaki.

== Early life ==
Watanabe was born in 1846. in the hamlet of Tobori in Shinano Province, now part of Okaya, Nagano Prefecture, where his father was a samurai in the service of Takashima Domain. He lost his parents while still a small child and was raised by his grandparents and elder brother. After attending the domainal academy to study military arts, he was sent to Edo to enroll in the academy run by Sakuma Shōzan. However, after Sakuma's assassination, he stayed at the domain's Edo residence, where he studied the French language. In 1868, he was sent to Kyoto as part of the retinue of his daimyō, Suwa Tadaaya, who had been assigned guard duties at Kyoto Palace, and it was at this time that he first met Ōkubo Toshimichi, whom he refused entrance to the Palace on the grounds that his pass was not in order.

== Early Meiji period ==
In 1871, following the Meiji Restoration, Watanabe and his brother were called to Tokyo, and were able to secure positions at the new Ministry of Popular Affairs with Ōkubo's assistance. In 1873, he joined the Ministry of the Treasury. However, with the Seikanron debate and issues caused by the Freedom and People's Rights Movement, Ōkubo called upon Watanabe as a troubleshooter for the Home Ministry, sending him a governor of Kōchi Prefecture and Tokushima Prefecture in 1876, and with the start of the Satsuma Rebellion, sending him as governor of Fukuoka Prefecture in 1877, and back to Kōchi in 1879. Ultimately unsuccessful in assisting Ōkubo, he resigned his posts and retired to seclusion in Kyoto, where he devoted his time to studies of French, German and English, as well as classical Latin and Greek. With the government reorganization of 1881, Watanabe was recalled to government service by Matsukata Masayoshi in 1882 as Chief of the Research Bureau of the Finance Ministry, followed by Budgetary Director in 1886 and Finance Secretary in 1888.

== Cabinet Minister ==
Following Matsukata's resignation in the aftermath of the election scandal precipitated by Shinagawa Yajirō in 1892, Watanabe was appointed Minister of Finance under the 2nd Itō Hirobumi administration. During his tenure, the government was in a budgetary deadlock, as the opposition parties demanded a large reduction in public spending, whereas the military was pushing for more warships. The impasse was only resolved through the personal intervention of Emperor Meiji, and Watanabe was replaced as Finance Minister by Matsukata on 17 March 1896, but returned to the same post from 27 August to 18 September of the same year. Watanabe was involved in establishment of the Committee on the Monetary System that was charged with the analysis of the best monetary system for Japan's economy in the long run.

Watanabe also held the post of Communications Minister in 1895 under the 2nd Itō administration and also served as Itō's vice premier.

In 1900, Watanabe became one of the founding organizers of the Rikken Seiyūkai political party. He was reappointed as Finance Minister under the 4th Itō administration in 1900–1901, despite having had a falling out with Itō earlier on the subject of political appointments. During his tenure, he attempted to impose an austerity budget, with implementation of a sugar tax and a liquor tax, and cutbacks in government enterprises. The measures passed the lower house, but were blocked by the upper house, resulting in another deadlocked Diet of Japan which was resolved only through his resignation.

== Later years and death ==
Following his resignation, Watanabe largely retired from public life. He made a trip to Russia before the Russo-Japanese War of 1904–1905 and returned a strong proponent of the conflict, and was a leader in the opposition to the Treaty of Portsmouth. After suffering from a stroke, he retired to his villa in Azabu, Tokyo, and subsequently to Izu, where he died in 1919 at the age of 73. A lifelong bachelor, he adopted Chifuyu Watanabe the third son of his brother Chiaki as his heir. Watanabe wrote poems and prose as well as he played the Japanese harp, koto.

Political offices
Preceded by Matsukata Masayoshi	Minister of Finance; 8 August 1892 – 17 March 1896	Succeeded by Matsukata Masayoshi
Preceded by Matsukata Masayoshi	Minister of Finance; 27 August 1896 – 18 September 1896	Succeeded by Matsukata Masayoshi
Preceded by Matsukata Masayoshi	Minister of Finance; 10 October 1900 – 14 May 1901	Succeeded by Saionji Kinmochi
Preceded by Kuroda Kiyotaka	Minister of Communications; 17 March 1895 – 9 October 1895	Succeeded by Shirane Sen'ichi
