= Kuroda Kiyotaka =

Prime Minister of Japan from 1888 to 1889

Count Kuroda Kiyotaka
- 黒田 清隆
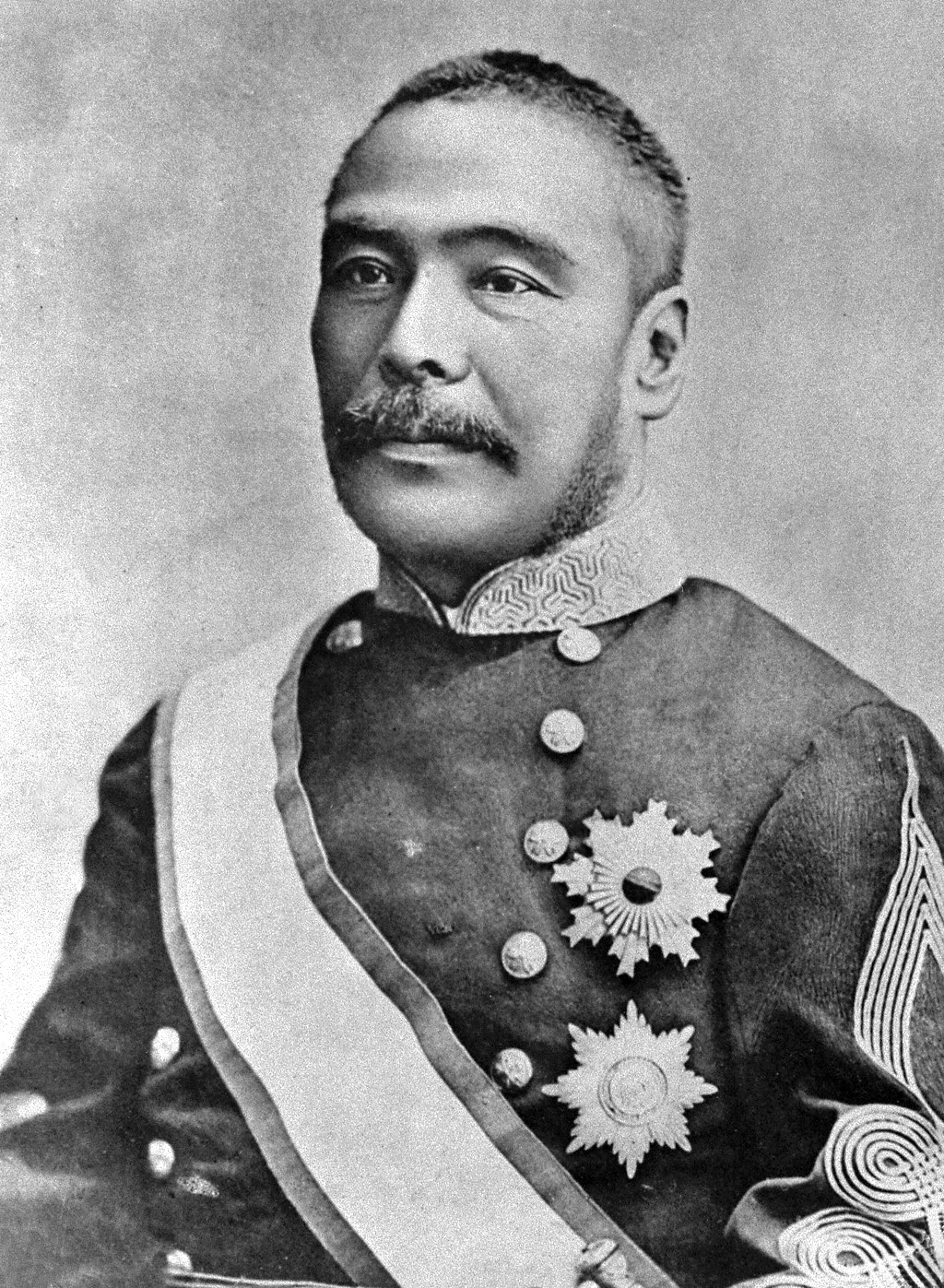

Prime Minister of Japan
- In office 30 April 1888 – 25 October 1889
- Monarch: Meiji
- Preceded by: Itō Hirobumi
- Succeeded by: Sanjō Sanetomi (caretaker); Yamagata Aritomo

President of the Privy Council
- In office 17 March 1894 – 23 August 1900
- Monarch: Meiji
- Vice President: Higashikuze Michitomi
- Preceded by: Yamagata Aritomo
- Succeeded by: Saionji Kinmochi

Acting Prime Minister of Japan
- In office 31 August 1896 – 18 September 1896
- Monarch: Meiji
- Preceded by: Itō Hirobumi
- Succeeded by: Matsukata Masayoshi

Minister of Communications
- In office 8 August 1892 – 17 March 1895
- Prime Minister: Itō Hirobumi
- Preceded by: Gotō Shōjirō
- Succeeded by: Watanabe Kunitake

Minister of Agriculture and Commerce
- In office 17 September 1887 – 30 April 1888
- Prime Minister: Itō Hirobumi
- Preceded by: Hijikata Hisamoto
- Succeeded by: Inoue Kaoru

Director of the Hokkaidō Development Commission
- In office 2 August 1874 – February 1882
- Monarch: Meiji
- Preceded by: Higashikuze Michitomi (1871)
- Succeeded by: Saigō Jūdō

Personal details
- Born: 9 November 1840 Kagoshima, Satsuma, Japan
- Died: 23 August 1900 (aged 59) Tokyo, Japan
- Cause of death: Intracerebral hemorrhage
- Party: Independent
- Spouse: Kuroda Taki (m. 1880)

Japanese name
- Kyūjitai: 黑田 淸隆
- Shinjitai: 黒田 清隆
Transcriptions
- Romanization: Kuroda Kiyotaka

Count Kuroda Kiyotaka (黒田 清隆; 9 November 1840 – 23 August 1900) was a Japanese politician and general who served as prime minister of Japan from 1888 to 1889. He was one of the genrō, or senior statesman of the Meiji era. Born in the Satsuma Domain to a samurai family, Kuroda was involved in the colonization of Hokkaido, the Japan–Korea Treaty of 1876, and the suppression of the Satsuma Rebellion in 1877. After his tenure as prime minister, which ended due to his inability to revise the unequal treaties imposed on Japan, Kuroda also served as Minister of Communications and President of the Privy Council.

== Biography ==
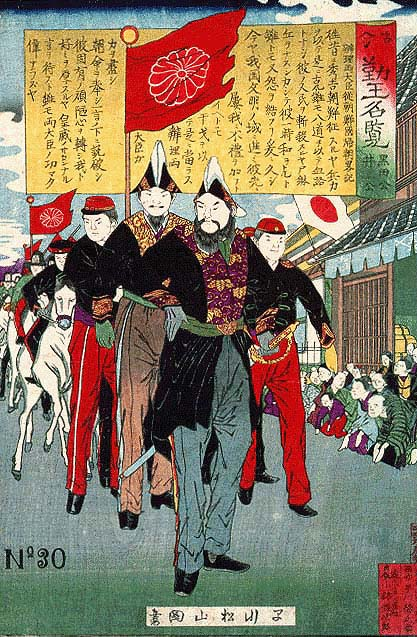
Nishiki-e painting of Kuroda Kiyotaka

=== Satsuma samurai ===
Kuroda was born to a samurai family serving the Shimazu daimyō of the Satsuma Domain, in Kyūshū.

In 1862, Kuroda was involved in the Namamugi incident, in which Satsuma retainers killed a British national who refused to bow down to the daimyo's procession. This led to the Anglo-Satsuma War in 1863, in which Kuroda played an active role. Immediately after the war, he went to Edo where he studied gunnery under Egawa Hidetatsu.

Returning to Satsuma, Kuroda became an active member of the Satsuma-Chōshū joint effort to overthrow the Tokugawa shogunate. Later, as a military leader in the Boshin War, he became famous for sparing the life of Enomoto Takeaki, who had stood against Kuroda's army at the Battle of Hakodate.

=== Political and diplomatic career ===
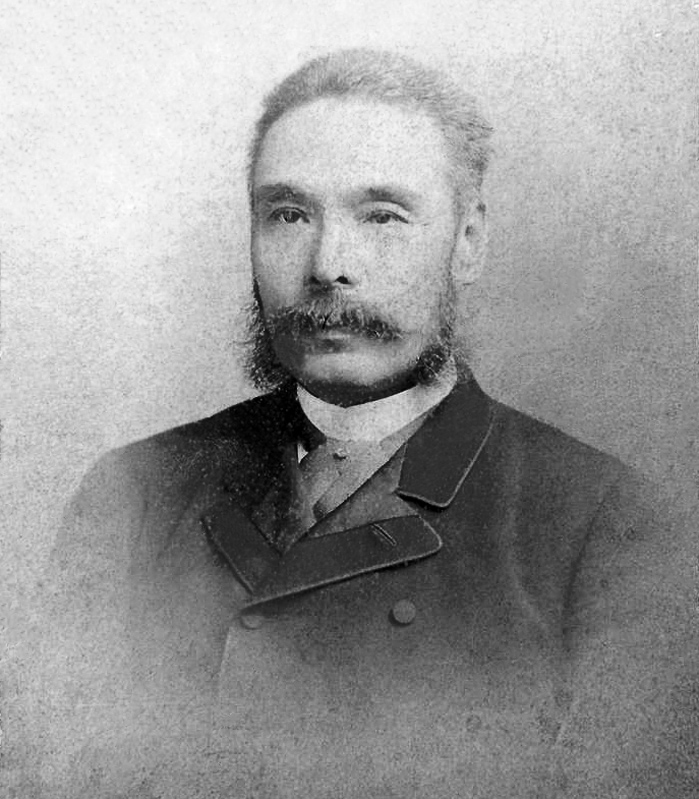
Kiyotaka Kuroda at a young age

Under the new Meiji government, Kuroda in 1870 became a pioneer-diplomat to Sakhalin, then known in Japanese as Karafuto and claimed by both Japan and the Russian Empire. Fearing Russia's push eastward, Kuroda returned to Tokyo and advocated quick development and settlement of Japan's northern frontier.

In 1871, he traveled to Europe and the United States for five months, and upon returning to Japan, he was put in charge of colonization efforts in Hokkaidō.

In 1874, Kuroda was named director of the Hokkaidō Development Commission, and organized a colonist-militia scheme to settle the island with unemployed ex-samurai and retired soldiers who would serve as both farmers and as a local militia. He was also promoted to lieutenant general in the Imperial Japanese Army. Kuroda invited agricultural experts from the United States to visit Hokkaidō, and to provide advice on what crops and production methods might be successful.

Kuroda was dispatched as an envoy to Korea in 1875, and negotiated the Japan–Korea Treaty of 1876. In 1877, he was sent as part of the force to suppress the Satsuma Rebellion. In 1878, he became de facto leader of Satsuma Domain following the assassination of Ōkubo Toshimichi.

Shortly before he left office in Hokkaidō, Kuroda became the central figure in the Hokkaidō Colonization Office Scandal of 1881. As part of the government's privatization program, Kuroda attempted to sell the assets of the Hokkaidō Colonization Office to a trading consortium created by some of his former Satsuma colleagues for a nominal price. When the terms of the sale were leaked to the press, the resultant public outrage caused the sale to fall through. Also in 1881, Kuroda's wife died of a lung disease, but on rumors that Kuroda had killed her in a drunken rage, the body was exhumed and examined. Kuroda was cleared of charges, but rumors of his problems with alcohol abuse persisted.

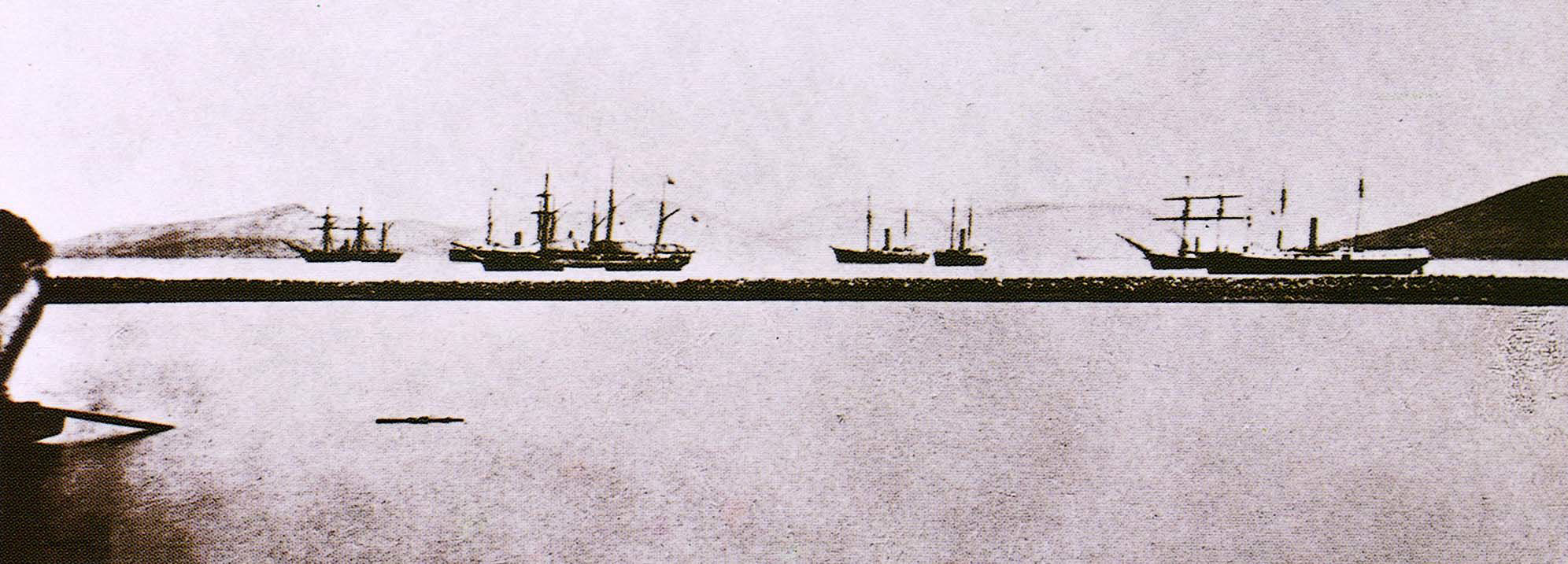
The embassy of Kuroda Kiyotaka, in Pusan, on its way to Ganghwa Island (江華島), Korea, 16 January 1876. There were 2 warships (Nisshin, Moshun and 3 troop transports of the Imperial Japanese Navy, and one liner for the embassy led by Kuroda.

In 1887, Kuroda was appointed to the cabinet post of Minister of Agriculture and Commerce.

=== Prime Minister (1888–1889) ===
Kuroda Kiyotaka became the 2nd Prime Minister of Japan, after Itō Hirobumi in 1888. During his term, he oversaw the promulgation of the Meiji Constitution. However, the vexing issue of Japan's inability to secure revision of the unequal treaties created considerable controversy. After drafts of proposed revisions drawn up by his foreign minister Ōkuma Shigenobu became public in 1889, the plan to appoint foreigners as judicial officers to abolish consular jurisdiction met with great opposition, and on 18 October a bombing occurred. In response to this, nearly all cabinet members abandoned amending the treaty, and Kuroda had no choice but to agree. On 25 October, Kuroda was forced to resign. He was succeeded by Sanjō Sanetomi as acting prime minister. Then, on 24 December 1889, Yamagata Aritomo, an army Field Marshal (Gensui) became the next prime minister of Japan.

=== Later life ===
Kuroda served as Minister of Communications in 1892 under the 2nd Itō Cabinet. He was appointed a genrō in November 1889, and became President of the Privy Council in 1895.

Kuroda died of a brain hemorrhage in 1900 and Enomoto Takeaki presided over his funeral ceremonies. His grave is at the Aoyama Cemetery in Tokyo.

== Honours ==
From the corresponding Japanese Wikipedia article

=== Peerages and other titles ===
- Count (7 July 1884)
- Genrō (1 November 1889)

=== Decorations ===
- Grand Cordon of the Order of the Rising Sun (2 November 1877)
- Grand Cordon of the Order of the Rising Sun with Paulownia Flowers (20 August 1895)
- Grand Cordon of the Order of the Chrysanthemum (25 August 1900; posthumous)

== See also ==
- List of Ambassadors from Japan to South Korea

Political offices
Preceded by Hijikata Hisamoto	Minister of Agriculture and Commerce; 1887–1888	Succeeded by Inoue Kaoru
Preceded by Itō Hirobumi	Prime Minister of Japan; 1888–1889	Succeeded by Sanjō Sanetomi; Acting
Preceded by Gotō Shōjirō	Minister of Communications; 1892–1895	Succeeded by Watanabe Kunitake
Preceded by Yamagata Aritomo	President of the Privy Council; 1894–1900	Succeeded by Saionji Kinmochi
Preceded by Itō Hirobumi	Prime Minister of Japan; Acting; 1896	Succeeded by Matsukata Masayoshi
