= Enomoto Takeaki =

Japanese samurai and admiral (1836–1908)

Senior Second Rank Viscount Enomoto Takeaki
- 榎本 武揚
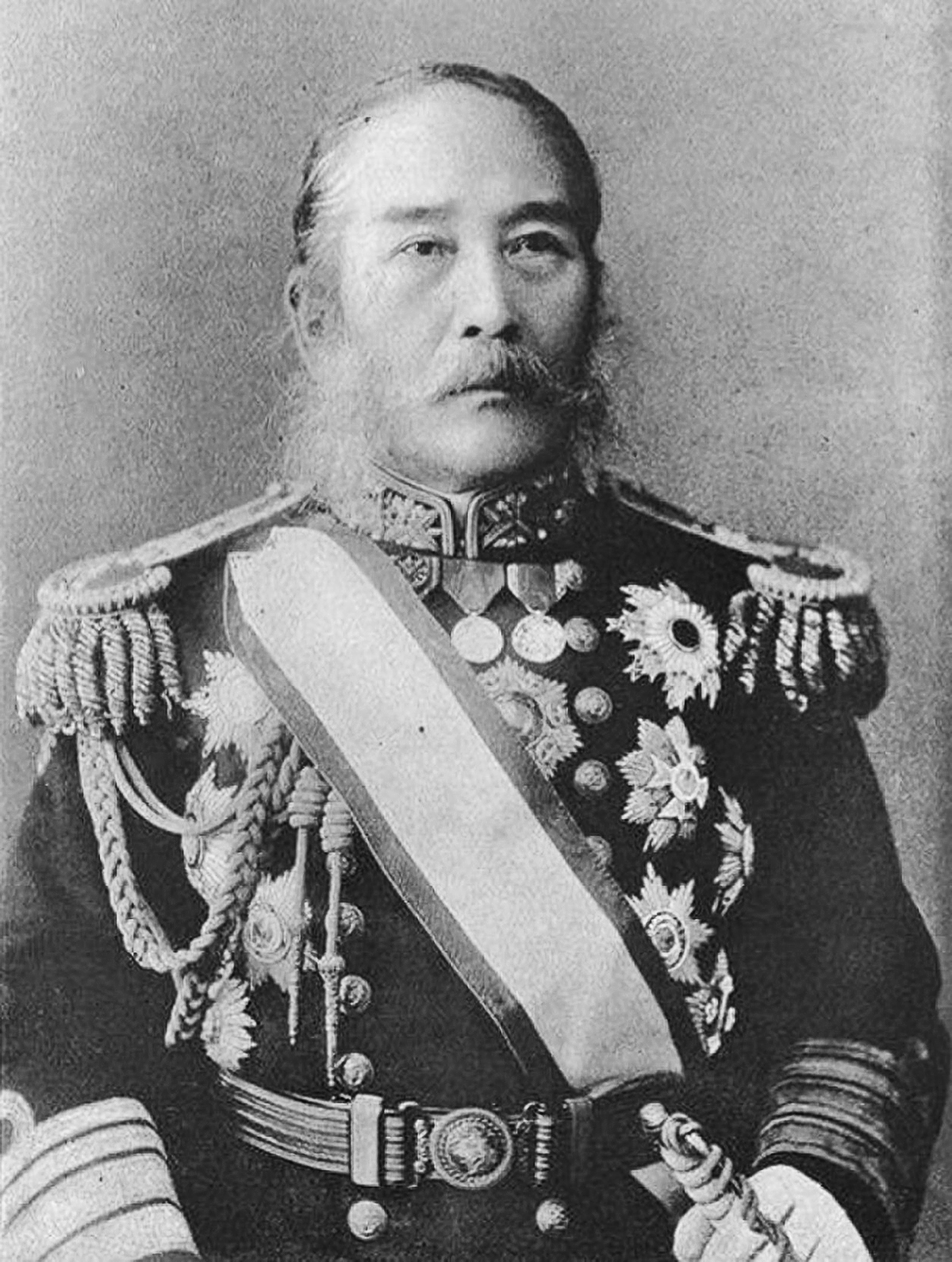

Sosai of the Republic of Ezo
- In office 27 January 1869 – 27 June 1869
- Vice President: Matsudaira Tarō
- Preceded by: Position established
- Succeeded by: Position abolished

Minister of Agriculture and Commerce
- In office 22 January 1894 – 29 March 1897
- Prime Minister: Itō Hirobumi; Matsukata Masayoshi
- Preceded by: Gotō Shōjirō
- Succeeded by: Ōkuma Shigenobu

Minister for Foreign Affairs
- In office 29 May 1891 – 8 August 1892
- Prime Minister: Matsukata Masayoshi
- Preceded by: Aoki Shūzō
- Succeeded by: Mutsu Munemitsu

Minister of Education
- In office 22 March 1889 – 17 May 1890
- Prime Minister: Kuroda Kiyotaka; Yamagata Aritomo
- Preceded by: Mori Arinori; Ōyama Iwao (acting)
- Succeeded by: Yoshikawa Akimasa

Minister of Communications
- In office 22 December 1885 – 22 March 1889
- Prime Minister: Itō Hirobumi; Kuroda Kiyotaka
- Preceded by: Office established
- Succeeded by: Gotō Shōjirō

Lord Admiral of the Navy
- In office 28 February 1880 – 7 April 1881
- Monarch: Meiji
- Preceded by: Kawamura Sumiyoshi
- Succeeded by: Kawamura Sumiyoshi

Personal details
- Born: 5 October 1836 Edo, Japan
- Died: 26 October 1908 (aged 72) Tokyo, Japan
- Resting place: Kisshō-ji, Bunkyō-ku, Tokyo; 35°43′39″N 139°45′13″E
- Spouse: Hayashi Tatsu (m. 1867; died 1892)
- Children: Enomoto Takenori (son); Enomoto Kinu (daughter); Enomoto Harunosuke (son); Enomoto Hisashi (son); Ishii Fujiko (daughter); Enomoto Takako (daughter)
- Parents: Enomoto Takeyuki (father); Koto (mother)
- Relatives: Enomoto Takeshi (brother)
- Education: Nagasaki Naval Training Center

Military service
- Allegiance: Tokugawa bakufu Republic of Ezo; Empire of Japan
- Branch/service: Imperial Japanese Navy
- Years of service: 1874–1908
- Rank: Vice Admiral
- Battles/wars: Boshin War; Battle of Hakodate; Naval Battle of Hakodate Bay

Viscount Enomoto Takeaki (榎本 武揚; 5 October 1836 – 26 October 1908) was a Japanese samurai and admiral of the Tokugawa navy of Bakumatsu period Japan, who remained faithful to the Tokugawa shogunate and fought against the new Meiji government until the end of the Boshin War. He later served in the Meiji government as one of the founders of the Imperial Japanese Navy.

== Biography ==
=== Early life ===
Enomoto was born as a member of a samurai family in the direct service of the Tokugawa clan in the Shitaya district of Edo (modern Taitō, Tokyo). Enomoto started learning Dutch in the 1850s, and after Japan's forced "opening" by Commodore Matthew Perry in 1854, he studied at the Tokugawa shogunate's Naval Training Center in Nagasaki and at the Tsukiji Warship Training Center in Edo.

At the age of 26, Enomoto was sent to the Netherlands to study western techniques in naval warfare and to procure western technologies. He stayed in Europe from 1862 to 1867, and became fluent in both the Dutch and English languages.

Enomoto returned to Japan on board the Kaiyō Maru, a steam warship purchased from the Netherlands by the Shogunal government. During his stay in Europe, Enomoto had realized that the telegraph would be an important means of communication in the future, and started planning a system to connect Edo and Yokohama. Upon his return, Enomoto was promoted to Kaigun Fukusōsai (海軍副総裁), the second highest rank in the Tokugawa Navy, at the age of 31. He also received the court title of Izumi-no-kami (和泉守).

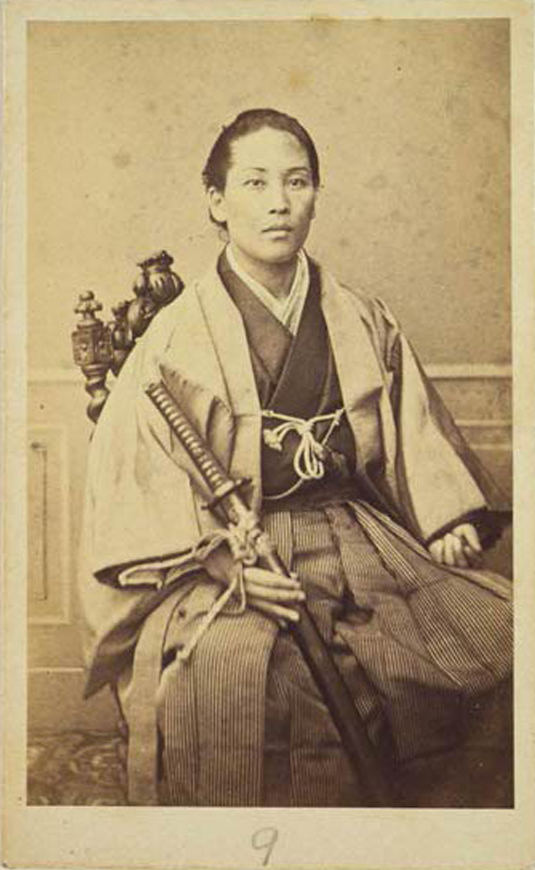
Enomoto in The Hague, 1864

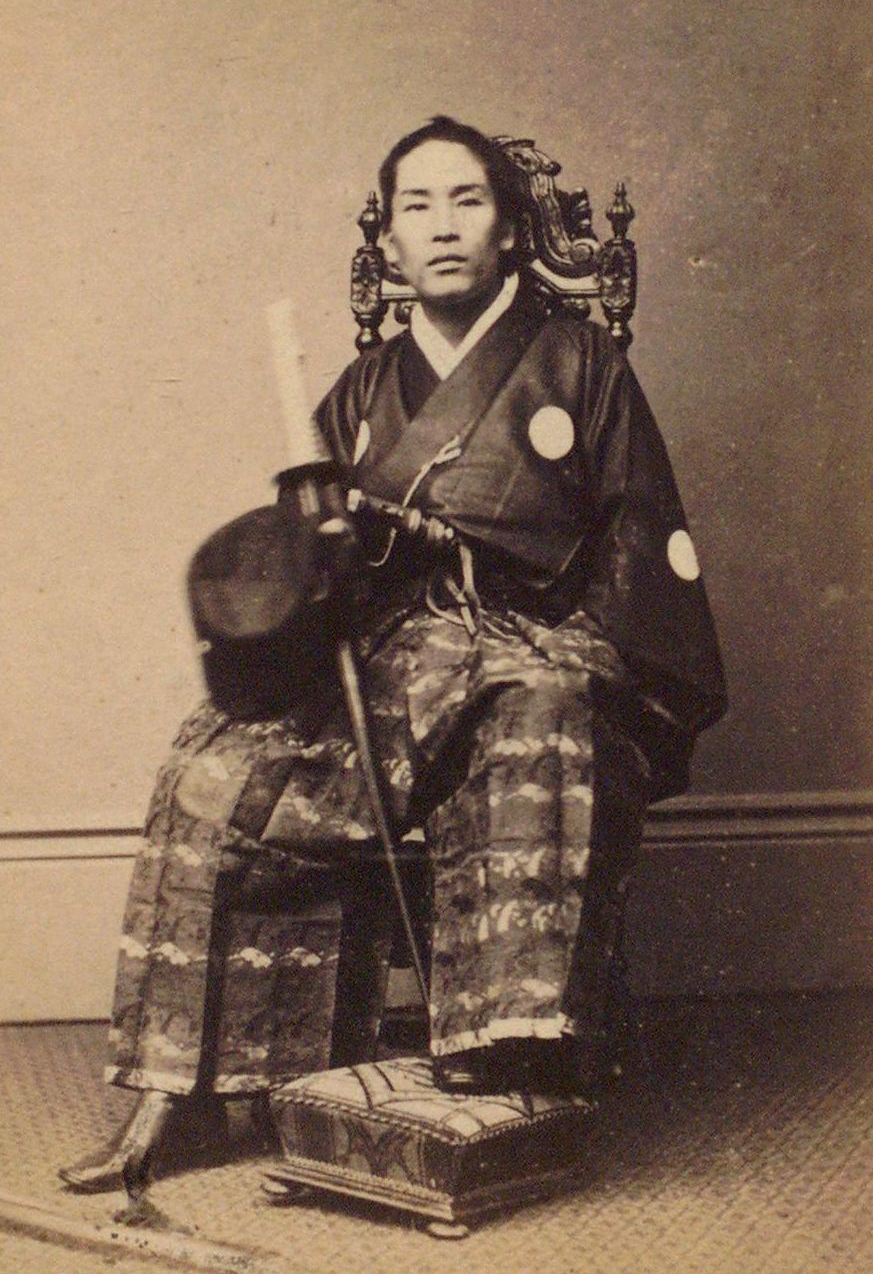
Enomoto Takeaki in The Netherlands 1863-1866

=== Boshin War and Meiji Restoration ===
During the Meiji Restoration, after the surrender of Edo in 1868 during the Boshin War to forces loyal to the Satchō Alliance, Enomoto refused to deliver up his warships, and escaped to Hakodate in Hokkaido with the remainder of the Tokugawa Navy and a handful of French military advisers and their leader Jules Brunet. His fleet of eight steam warships was the strongest in Japan at the time.

Enomoto hoped to create an independent country under the rule of the Tokugawa family in Hokkaido, but the Meiji government refused to accept partition of Japan. On 27 January 1869, the Tokugawa loyalists declared the foundation of the Republic of Ezo and elected Enomoto as president.

The Meiji government forces engaged and defeated Enomoto's forces in the Naval Battle of Hakodate in May 1869. Following the Battle of Hakodate on 27 June 1869, the Republic of Ezo collapsed, and Hokkaido came under the rule of the central government headed by the Meiji Emperor.

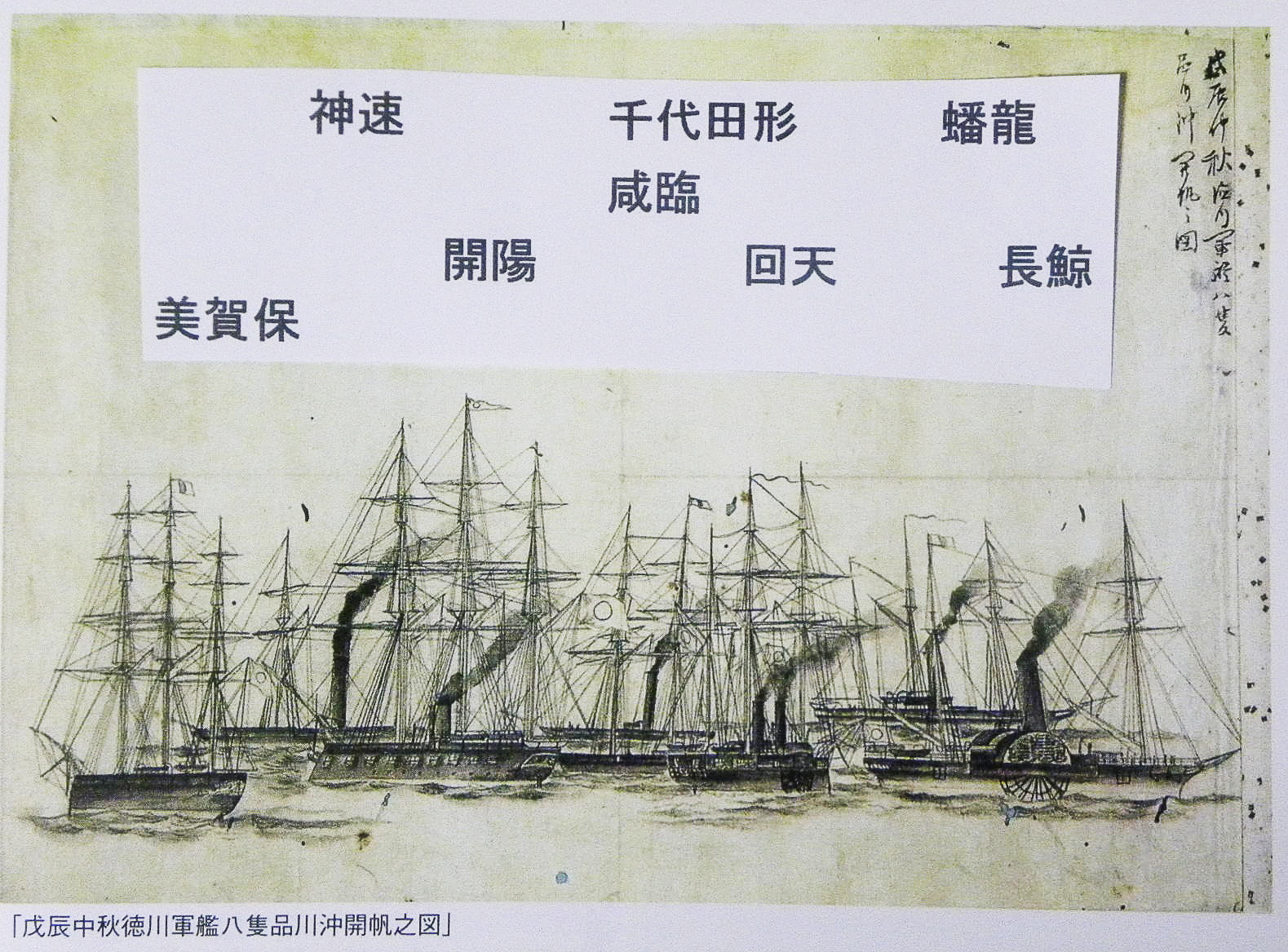
8 Tokugawa Warships led by Enomoto sailing Off Shinagawa 1868

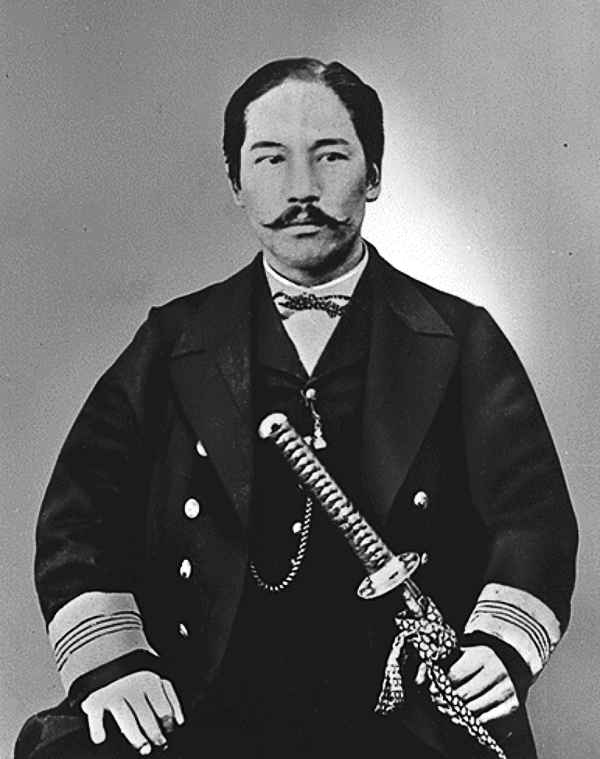
Enomoto Takeaki in Ezo, aged 32 (c. 1868–1869)

=== As a Meiji politician ===
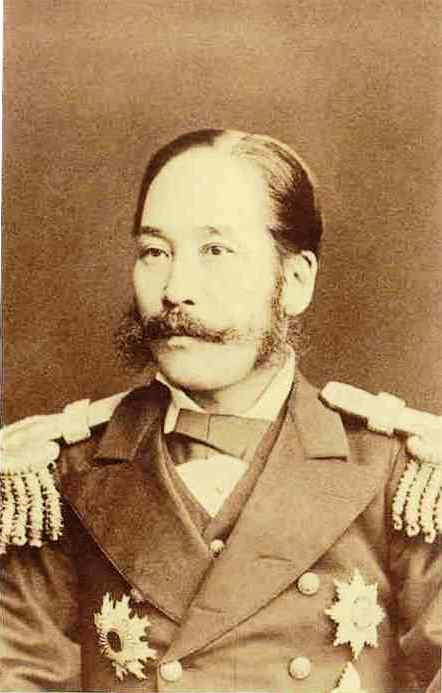
Enomoto Takeaki, unknown date

After his surrender, Enomoto was arrested, accused of high treason and imprisoned. However, the leaders of the new Meiji government (largely at the insistence of Kuroda Kiyotaka) realized that Enomoto's various talents and accumulated knowledge could be of use, and pardoned him in 1872. Enomoto became one of the few former Tokugawa loyalists who made the transition to the new ruling elite, as politics at the time was dominated by men from Chōshū and Satsuma, who had a strong bias against outsiders in general, and former Tokugawa retainers in particular. However, Enomoto was an exception, and rose quickly within the new ruling clique, to a higher status than any other member of the former Tokugawa administrations.

In 1874, Enomoto was given the rank of vice-admiral in the fledgling Imperial Japanese Navy. The following year, he was sent to Russia as a special envoy to negotiate the Treaty of St. Petersburg. The successful conclusion of the treaty was very well received in Japan and further raised Enomoto's prestige within the ruling circles, and the fact that Enomoto had been chosen for such an important mission was seen as evidence of reconciliation between former foes in the government.

In 1880, Enomoto became Navy Minister (海軍卿). In 1885, his diplomatic skills were again called upon to assist Itō Hirobumi in concluding the Convention of Tientsin with Qing China. Afterwards, Enomoto held a series of high posts in the Japanese government. He was Japan's first Minister of Communications (1885–1888) after the introduction of the cabinet system in 1885. He was also Minister of Agriculture and Commerce from 1894 to 1897, Minister of Education from 1889 to 1890 and Foreign Minister from 1891 to 1892.

In 1887, Enomoto was ennobled to the rank of viscount under the kazoku peerage system, and was selected as a member of the Privy Council.

Enomoto was especially active in promoting Japanese emigration through settler colonies in the Pacific Ocean and South and Central America. In 1891, he established—against the will of the cabinet of Matsukata Masayoshi—a "section for emigration" in the Foreign Ministry, with the task of encouraging emigration and finding new potential territories for Japanese settlement overseas. Two years later, after leaving the government, Enomoto also helped to establish a private organization, the "Colonial Association", to promote external trade and emigration.

== Death ==
Enomoto died in 1908 at the age of 72. His grave is at the temple of Kisshō-ji, Bunkyō-ku, Tokyo (35°43′39″N 139°45′13″E).

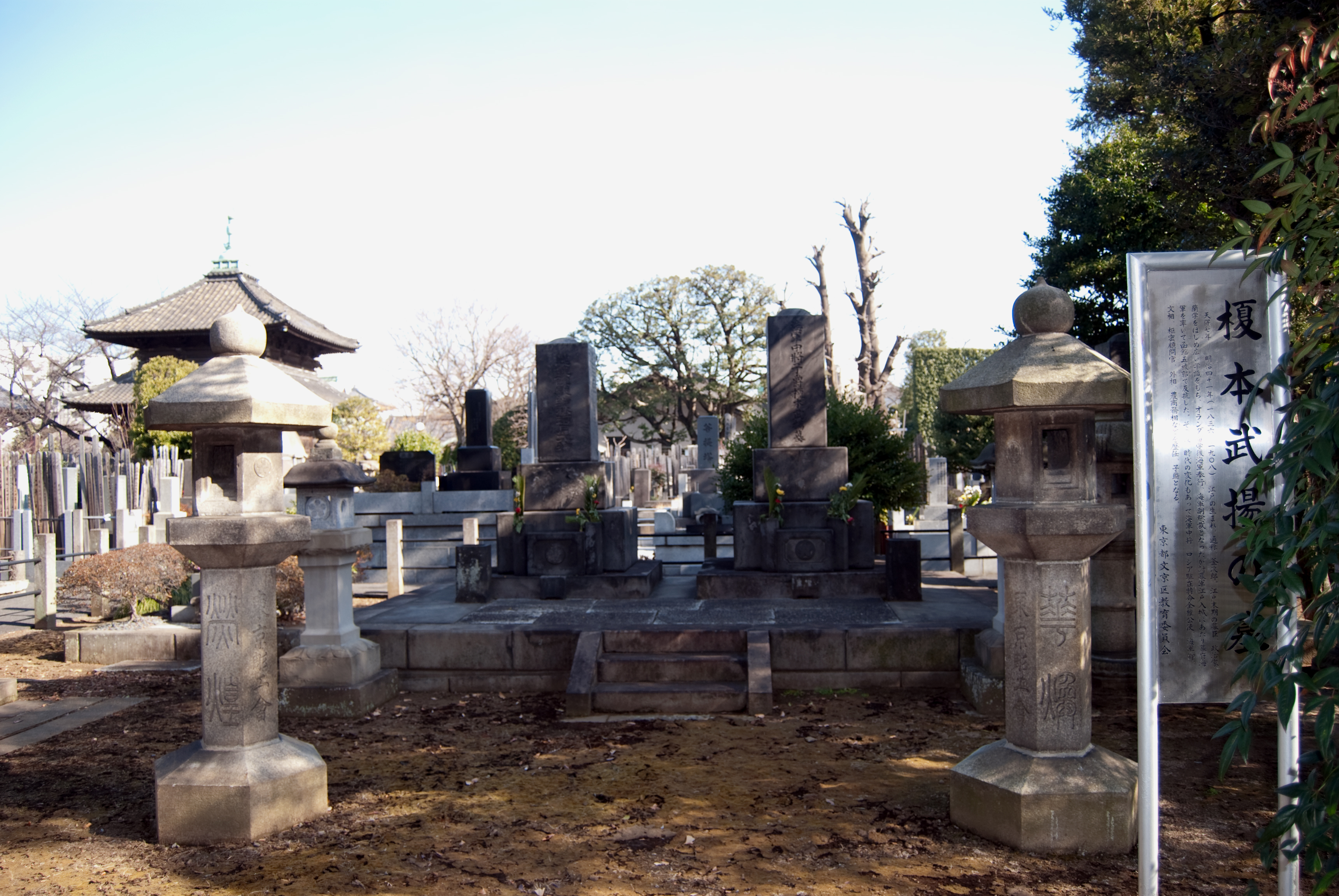
Tomb of Enomoto Takeaki in Kisshō-ji

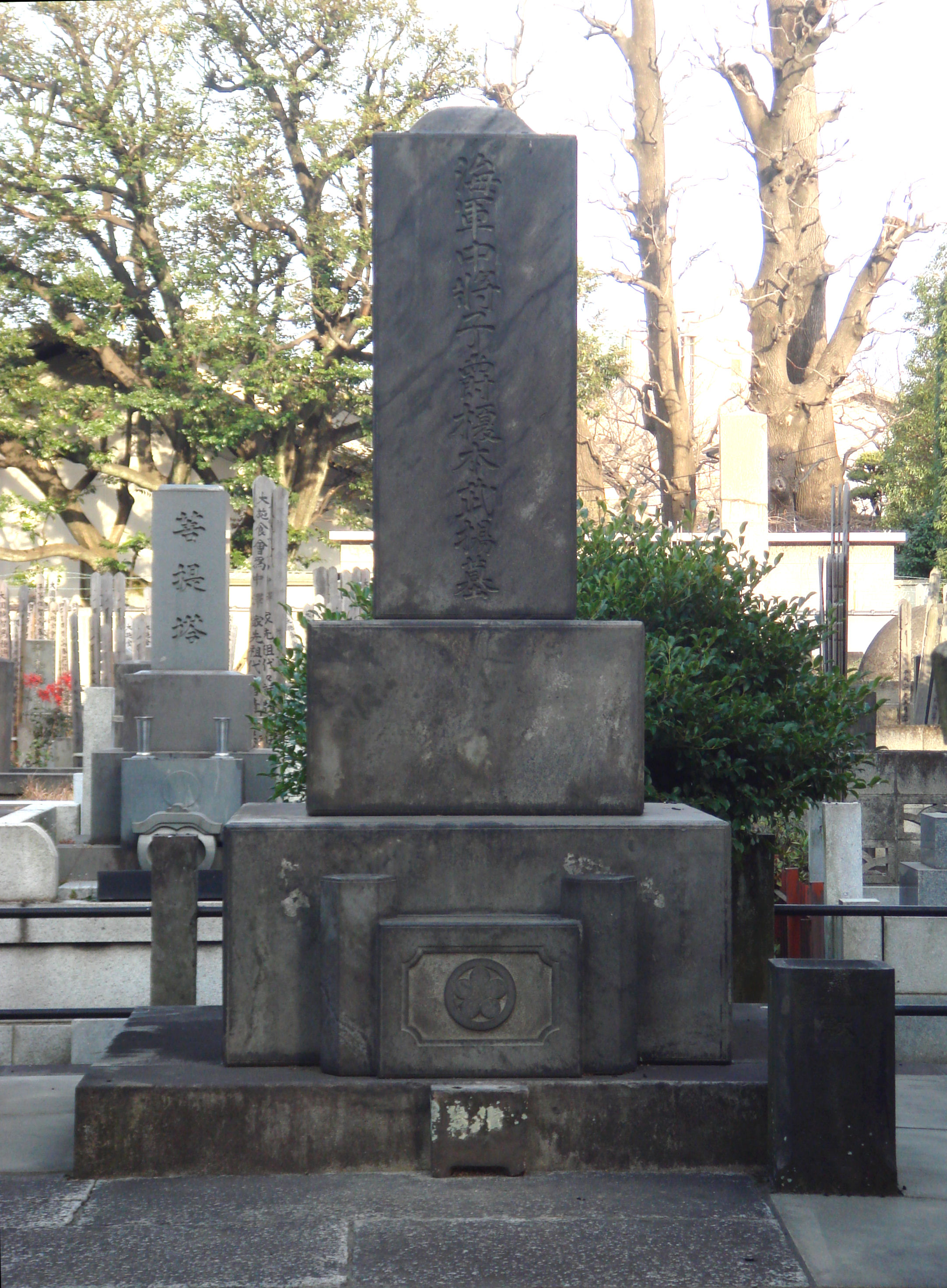
Close up Tomb of Enomoto Takeaki in Kisshō-ji

== Honours ==
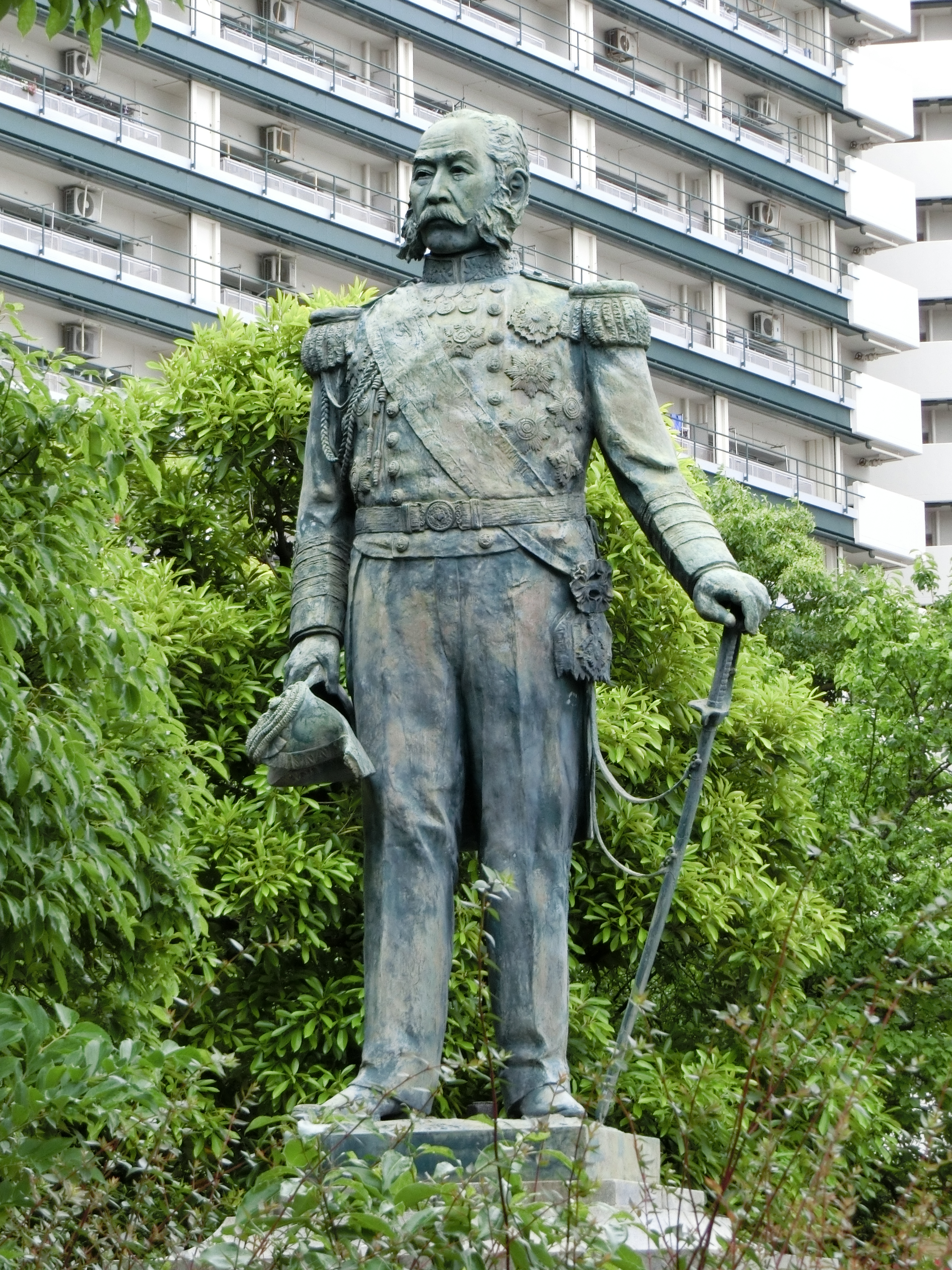
A statue of Enomoto Takeaki in Tokyo.

- Grand Cordon of the Order of the Rising Sun (1886)
- Senior Second Rank (1896)
- Grand Cordon of the Order of the Paulownia Flowers (1908)

== See also ==
- Jules Brunet
- Imperial Japanese Navy
- Naval Battle of Hakodate

== Notes ==
Government offices
New creation	President of Ezo; Jan 1869 – Jun 1869	Position abolished
Political offices
Preceded by Kawamura Sumiyoshi	Naval Lord (Ministry of Military Affairs); Feb 1880 – Apr 1881	Succeeded by Kawamura Sumiyoshi
New creation	Minister of Communications; Dec 1885 – Mar 1889	Succeeded by Gotō Shōjirō
Preceded by Ōyama Iwao	Minister of Education; Mar 1889 – May 1890	Succeeded by Yoshikawa Akimasa
Preceded by Aoki Shūzō	Minister for Foreign Affairs; May 1891 – Aug 1892	Succeeded by Mutsu Munemitsu
Preceded by Kuroda Kiyotaka	Minister of Agriculture & Commerce; Apr–Jul 1888 (interim)	Succeeded by Inoue Kaoru
Preceded by Gotō Shōjirō	Minister of Agriculture & Commerce; Jan 1894 – March 1897	Succeeded by Ōkuma Shigenobu
