= Inoue Kaoru =

Japanese politician (1836–1915)

Junior First Rank Marquess Inoue Kaoru GCMG
- 井上 馨
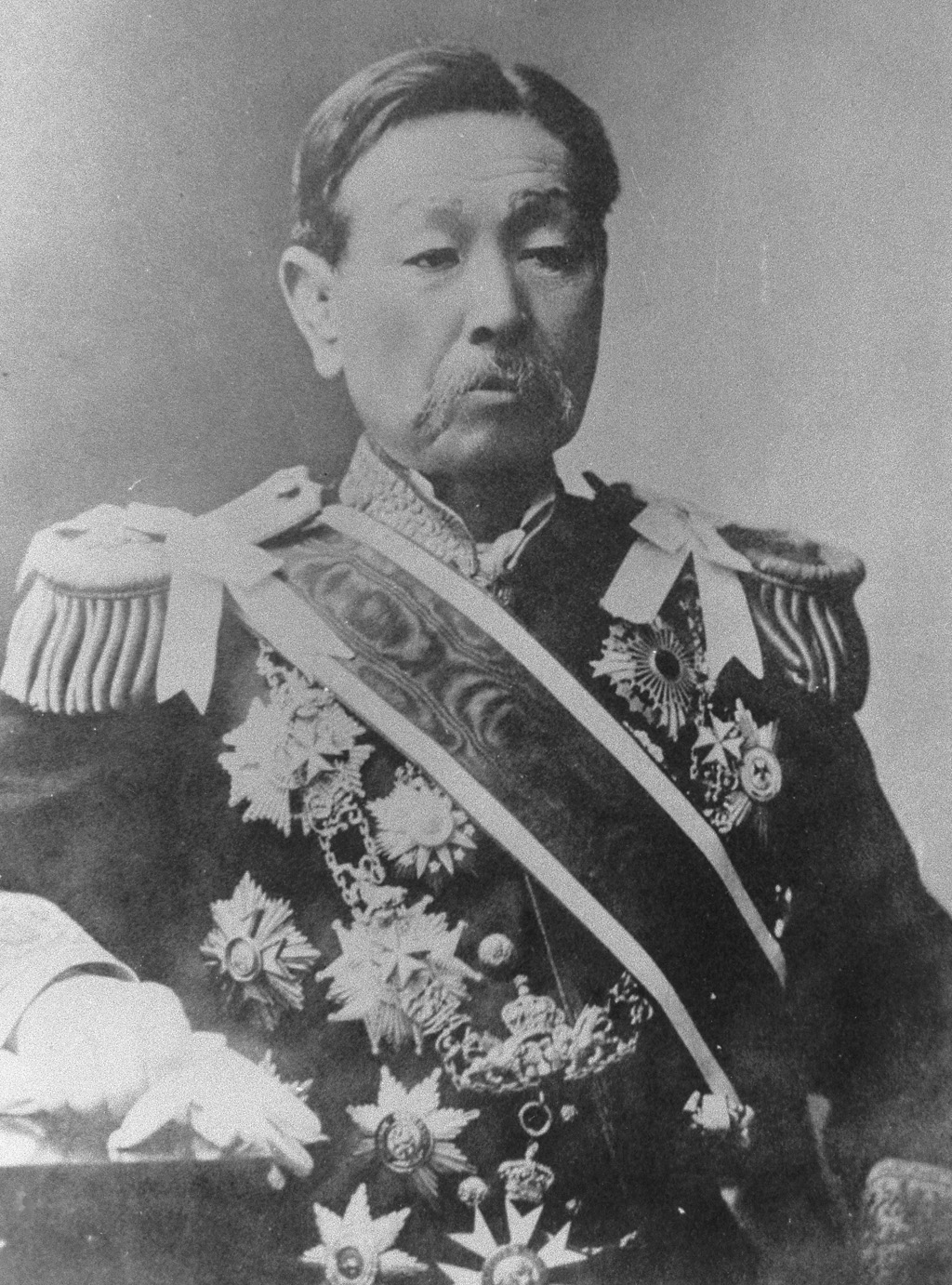
- Marquis Inoue Kaoru

Minister of Finance
- In office 12 January 1898 – 30 June 1898
- Prime Minister: Itō Hirobumi
- Preceded by: Matsukata Masayoshi
- Succeeded by: Matsuda Masahisa

Minister of Home Affairs
- In office 8 August 1892 – 15 October 1894
- Prime Minister: Itō Hirobumi
- Preceded by: Kōno Togama
- Succeeded by: Nomura Yasushi

Minister of Agriculture and Commerce
- In office 25 July 1888 – 23 December 1889
- Prime Minister: Kuroda Kiyotaka
- Preceded by: Kuroda Kiyotaka
- Succeeded by: Iwamura Michitoshi

Minister for Foreign Affairs
- In office 22 December 1885 – 17 September 1887
- Prime Minister: Itō Hirobumi
- Preceded by: Office established
- Succeeded by: Itō Hirobumi

Member of the House of Peers
- In office 21 September 1907 – 1 September 1915 Hereditary peerage

Personal details
- Born: 16 January 1836 Yuda, Suō, Japan
- Died: 1 September 1915 (aged 79) Ihara, Shizuoka, Japan
- Relatives: Katsunosuke Inoue (adopted nephew)
- Nickname: Shiji Bunta (志道 聞多)

Marquess Inoue Kaoru GCMG (井上 馨; 16 January 1836 – 1 September 1915) was a Japanese politician and a prominent member of the Meiji oligarchy during the Meiji period of the Empire of Japan. As one of the senior statesmen (Genrō) in Japan during that period, he had a tremendous influence on the selection of the nation's leaders and formation of its policies.

== Early life and education ==
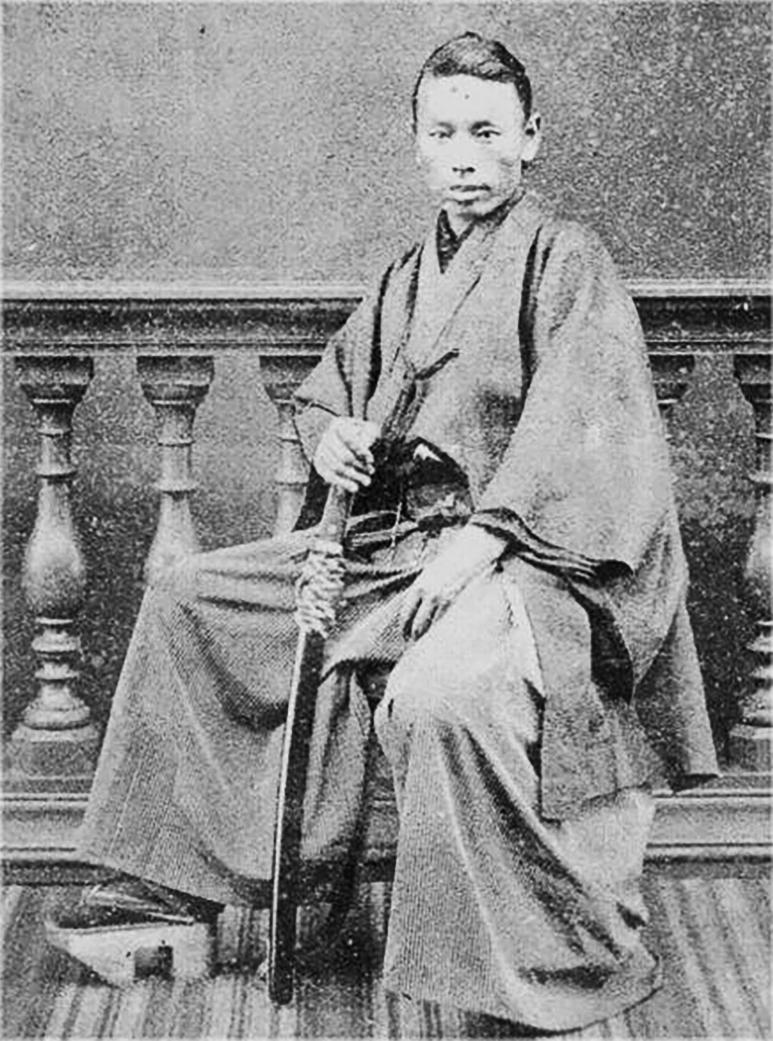
Inoue Kaoru as a young samurai.

Born Yakichi (勇吉) to a lower-ranked samurai family in Yuda, Chōshū domain (present day Yamaguchi, Yamaguchi Prefecture), Inoue attended the Meirinkan domain school with his brother Ikutarō (幾太郎). He was a close boyhood friend of Itō Hirobumi who later became Japan's first prime minister, and he played an active part in the sonnō jōi movement. In 1858, he studied rangaku, artillery and swordsmanship in Edo.

In the Bakumatsu period, Inoue emerged as a leader of the anti-foreigner movement in his native Chōshū. Desiring to rid Japan of foreigners, he and Takasugi Shinsaku set fire to the British legation in Edo in January 1863.

Recognizing Japan's need to learn from the Western powers, Inoue joined the Chōshū Five and was smuggled out of Japan to study at University College, London in England in 1863. When he returned with Itō Hirobumi, he unsuccessfully tried to prevent war (the Battle of Shimonoseki) between Chōshū and the Western naval powers over the closing of the Straits of Shimonoseki to foreign shipping.

Later, during the 1864 First Chōshū Expedition which he was severely wounded by assassins from a rival Chōshū faction. Suffering a near-fatal injury, Inoue asked his elder brother to behead him and end his unbearable pain. However, Ikutaro Tokoro, who was in hiding from the Tokugawa shogunate alongside Prince Sanjō Sanetomi, rushed to Inoue's aid. In an emergency procedure during the wartime chaos, Tokoro stitched Inoue's wounds—about 50 in total—using a tatami needle and without anesthesia. (According to a story featured in the National Japanese textbook of the 5th period, Inoue's mother, holding her bloodied son, dissuaded his elder brother from carrying out the beheading.)

He later played a key role in the formation of the Satchō Alliance against the Tokugawa shogunate.

== Statesman in the Meiji government ==
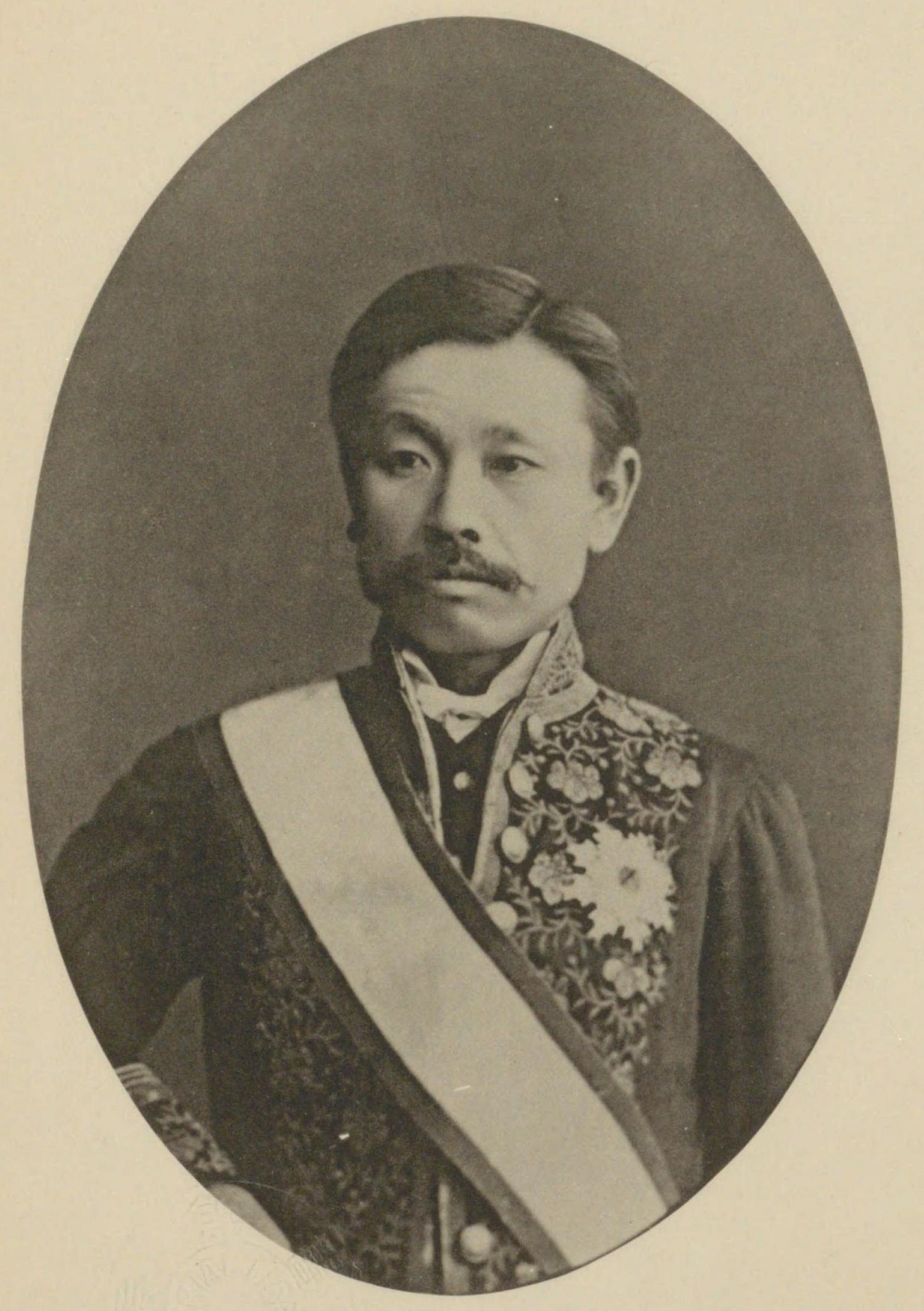
Inoue Kaoru as Foreign Minister

After the Meiji Restoration, Inoue served in several important positions in the new Meiji government. He was appointed Vice Minister of Finance in 1871 and was influential in reorganizing government finances on modern lines, especially in the reform of the land tax system, termination of government stipends to the ex-samurai and former aristocracy and for promoting industrialization. Closely linked to business circles, including the emerging Mitsui zaibatsu, he was also involved in the railway business. These measures created many political enemies, and Inoue was forced to resign in May 1873. Inoue took part in the Osaka Conference of 1875 to support the creation of a representative national assembly.

In 1876, Inoue was asked to assist in the field of foreign affairs, and was involved in the conclusion of the Japan-Korea Treaty of 1876 as vice-ambassador extraordinary and plenipotentiary. He returned to government as Minister of Public Works in 1878 and Lord of Foreign Affairs in 1879 under the early Meiji Dajō-kan Cabinet. In 1884, he was elevated to the rank of count (hakushaku) under the new kazoku peerage system.

In December 1885, Inoue officially became Japan's first Minister of Foreign Affairs bearing that title in the first Itō Hirobumi cabinet. However, Inoue came under public criticism for his failure to negotiate a revision of the unequal treaties, his building of the Rokumeikan, and support of its Westernizing influences, which forced him to resign in August 1887.

Later he served as Minister of Agriculture and Commerce in the Kuroda administration, as Home Minister in the second Itō administration and again as Finance Minister in the 3rd Itō administration.

From 1901 onwards, Inoue served as most senior of the genrō, and considered himself the government's foremost advisor on financial affairs. He was advanced to the title of marquis (kōshaku) in 1907, and died in 1915 at his summer home at Okitsu-juku, Shizuoka prefecture.

== Honours ==
From the article in the Japanese Wikipedia

=== Japanese ===
==== Peerages and other titles ====
- Count (7 July 1884)
- Genrō (18 February 1904)
- Marquess (21 September 1907)

==== Decorations ====
- Grand Cordon of the Order of the Rising Sun (10 February 1879)
- Grand Cordon of the Order of the Rising Sun with Paulownia Flowers (7 October 1895)
- Grand Cordon of the Order of the Chrysanthemum (1 April 1906)
- Collar of the Order of the Chrysanthemum (1 September 1915; posthumous)

=== Foreign ===
- Kingdom of Italy: Knight Grand Cross of the Order of the Crown (2 December 1879)
- France: Grand Officer of the Legion of Honour (26 March 1883)
- German Empire: Grand Cross of the Order of the Red Eagle (25 May 1883)
- Spain: Order of Charles III, 3rd Class (1 March 1884)
- Kingdom of Portugal: Knight Grand Cross of the Order of the Immaculate Conception of Vila Viçosa (7 May 1884)
- Russian Empire: Knight of the White Eagle (8 March 1885)
- Austria-Hungary: Knight of the Iron Crown, 1st Class (10 November 1892)
- United Kingdom: Honorary Knight Grand Cross of the Order of St. Michael and St. George (GCMG) (20 February 1906)

== See also ==
- List of Ambassadors from Japan to South Korea

Political offices
Preceded by none	Minister for Foreign Affairs of Japan; Dec 1885 – Sept 1887	Succeeded by Itō Hirobumi
Preceded by Kuroda Kiyotaka	Minister of Agriculture and Commerce; Jul 1888 – Dec 1889	Succeeded by Iwamura Michitoshi
Preceded by Kōno Togama	Home Minister; Aug 1892 – Oct 1894	Succeeded by Nomura Yasushi
Preceded by Matsukata Masayoshi	Finance Minister; Jan 1898 – Jun 1898	Succeeded by Matsuda Masahisa
