= Imperial Japanese Armed Forces =

Combined military forces of the Empire of Japan

- 大日本帝国軍/日本軍
- Flag of Imperial Japan
- Founded: 3 January 1868
- Disbanded: November 1945
- Service branches: IJA; IJAAS; Kempeitai; Imperial Guard; IJN; IJNAS; IJLF; SNLF; Tokkeitai
- Headquarters: Imperial General Headquarters

Leadership
- Emperor of Japan: Meiji (1868–1912); Taishō (1912–1926); Shōwa (1926–1945)

Personnel
- Conscription: 18–35

Related articles
- History: Military history of Japan
- Ranks: Army ranks Navy ranks

The Imperial Japanese Armed Forces (IJAF, full Japanese: 帝国陸海軍, romanized: Teikoku riku-kaigun or Nippon-gun (日本軍) for short, meaning "Japanese Forces") were the unified forces of the Empire of Japan. Formed during the Meiji Restoration in 1868, they were disbanded in 1945, shortly after Japan's defeat to the Allies of World War II; the revised Constitution of Japan, drafted during the Allied occupation of Japan, replaced the IJAF with the present-day Japan Self-Defense Forces.

The Imperial Japanese Army and the Imperial Japanese Navy functioned as the IJAF's primary service branches, with the country's aerial power being split between the Army Air Service under the former and the Navy Air Service under the latter.

== History ==
The IJAF was founded with an edict emanated on 3 January 1868, as part of the Japanese reorganization of the army and the application of innovations during the Meiji Restoration. The reorganization of the army and the navy during the Meiji period boosted Japanese military strength, allowing the Imperial Japanese Army and the Imperial Japanese Navy to achieve major victories, such as during the First Sino-Japanese War and the Russo-Japanese War.

The IJAF also served in World War I and World War II. It was operational until the Surrender of Japan in 1945.

== Organization ==
During the pre-war era the army and navy had separate school branches. Since the Meiji era, the Choshu Domain from Yamaguchi Prefecture dominated the IJA. The IJN was dominated by the Satsuma Domain from Kagoshima Prefecture. This resulted in that they operated separately rather than a single umbrella strategy.

During the Showa period, the IJA and IJN had different outlooks on allies and enemies. The IJA considered Nazi Germany as a natural partner and the Soviet Union as a threat, while the IJN argued that alliance with Nazi Germany would hurt relations with the United Kingdom and the United States.

Equipment in different branches of the military was also procured separately. For example, the IJA secured its own ships and self-designed submarines in World War 2. Former Prime Minister Shigeru Yoshida criticized the sectionalism of the IJAF.

== Interservice rivalry ==
The Imperial Army and Navy had a fierce interservice rivalry centering around how the Imperial Japanese Armed Forces ought to secure territories containing valuable natural resources not available at home to fuel and grow the Japanese economy. The Army mainly supported the Hokushin-ron doctrine, which called for expansion into Manchuria and Siberia and would have the army take on a prime role, while the Navy supported the Nanshin-ron doctrine, which stated that Japan ought to expand into Southeast Asia and the Pacific Islands and would be reliant on the navy to do so.

== Main chronology ==
=== Under Emperor Meiji ===
- 1870 (1870) Proclamation of unified military system (Army is French-style, Navy is British-style)
- 1871 (1871) Goshinpei are organized by donations from Satsuma, Choshu, and Tosa.
- Proclamation of conscription order in 1873
- 1874 Saga Rebellion, Taiwan troop dispatch
- Ganghwa Island Incident in 1875
- 1876 Shinpūren rebellion, Akizuki Rebellion, Hagi Rebellion
- Meiji 10 (1877) Satsuma Rebellion
- 1882 (1882) Promulgation of the Imperial Rescript to Soldiers
- 1888 (1888) Promulgation of the Army General Staff Ordinance, the Navy General Staff Ordinance, and the Division Headquarters Ordinance
- 1889 (Meiji 22) Promulgation of the Constitution of the Empire of Japan
- 1893 (Meiji 26) Promulgation of the Wartime Imperial Headquarters Ordinance
- Meiji 27 (1894) First Sino-Japanese War
- 1895 Japanese troops requisition Taiwan based on the Treaty of Shimonoseki
- 1899 (Meiji 32) Boxer Rebellion Incident
- 1900 (Meiji 33) Established an active military officer system of the military minister, Kitasei incident
- Meiji 37 (1904) Russo-Japanese War
- 1905 (Meiji 38) Operation Sakhalin, the end of the Russo-Japanese War

=== Under Emperor Taishō ===
- In 1913, the military minister can be appointed as a reserve, back-up, or retired general.
- 1914 Siemens scandal, World War I (Battle of Qingdao)
- 1918 Siberian intervention, end of World War I
- 1919 (Taisho 8) Promulgation of the Kwantung Army Headquarters Ordinance
- Nikolayevsk Incident in 1920
- 1921 Washington Naval Treaty
- The Amakasu Incident in 1923
- Siberian intervention ended in 1925, Ugaki military contraction

=== Under Emperor Shōwa ===
- Shōwa 2 (1927)
  - First Shandong troops
  - First Nanking Incident
- Shōwa 3 (1928)
  - Second Shandong troops
  - Jinan Incident
  - Zhang Zuolin bombing case
- Shōwa 5 (1930)
  - London Naval Treaty
  - Taiwan Musha Incident
- Shōwa 6 (1931)
  - March Incident
  - Manchurian Incident
  - October Incident
- Shōwa 7 (1932)
  - January 28 Incident
  - May 15 Incident
  - Manchuria founded
- Shōwa 9 (1934)
  - Washington Naval Treaty abolished
- Shōwa 11 (1936)
  - February 26 Incident
  - Resurrection of the military minister's active military service system
  - Japan-Germany Anti-Comintern Pact
- Shōwa 12 (1937)
  - China Incident (Second Sino-Japanese War)
  - Marco Polo Bridge Incident
  - Tongzhou case
  - Battle of Beiping-Tianjin
  - Battle of Shanghai
  - Rape of Nanking
- Shōwa 13 (1938)
  - Battle of Wuhan
  - Battle of Lake Khasan
  - Promulgation of the National Mobilization Law
- Shōwa 14 (1939)
  - The Battle of Khalkhin Gol
- Shōwa 15 (1940)
  - Annexation of French Indochina
- Shōwa 16 (1941)
  - Declaration of war against the United States and United Kingdom, Greater East Asia War (Pacific War), Southern Operation (Invasion of Hong Kong, Malayan Campaign, Pearl Harbor attack, etc.)
  - Sinking of HMS Prince of Wales and HMS Repulse
- Shōwa 17 (1942)
  - Battle of Rabaul (start of New Guinea Campaign)
  - Fall of Singapore
  - Bombing of Darwin
  - Dutch East Indies Campaign
  - Battle of Yunnan-Burma Road
  - Battle of Ceylon
  - Battle of Midway
  - Kokoda Track Campaign
- Shōwa 18 (1943)
  - Battle of Guadalcanal Island
  - Navy Instep Incident
  - Battle of Attu
- Shōwa 19 (1944)
  - Navy B case
  - Operation C (U Go Offensive)
  - Operation Ichi-Go
  - Battle of Mariana and Palau Islands
  - Philippines Defense Battle
  - Creation of a special attack corps
- Shōwa 20 (1945)
  - February Yalta Conference
  - Rape of Manila
  - Battle of Iwo Jima
  - March Tokyo air raid
  - Battle of Okinawa
  - Participation in the Soviet Union against Japan (Soviet invasion of Manchuria / Battle of Sakhalin / Battle of Shumshu)
  - Accepting the Potsdam Declaration
  - Soviet troops occupy the South Karafuto and Kuril Islands
  - September 2-Japanese Instrument of Surrender Signing Ceremony on Battleship Missouri (Japanese Instrument of Surrender, All Armies Stopped Combat, Disarmament Order), Greater East Asia War (Pacific War) and End of World War II
  - Soviet Union occupies the Northern Territories
  - November The Ministry of the Army and the Ministry of the Navy are dismantled and become the 1st Ministry of Demobilization and the 2nd Ministry of Demobilization.
- Shōwa 21 (1946)
  - May International Military Tribunal for the Far East opens
  - November 3-Promulgation of the Constitution of Japan
- Shōwa 22 (1947)
  - May 3-Enforcement of the Constitution of Japan
- Shōwa 25 (1950)
  - August 10-Establishment of National Police Reserve
- Shōwa 27 (1952)
  - August 10-National Safety Forces reorganization
- Shōwa 29 (1954)
  - July 1-Established "Self-Defense Forces (land, sea, aviation)" and established the Defense Agency (shifted to "Ministry of Defense" on January 9, 2007)

== Components ==
- Supreme War Council
  - Imperial General Headquarters
  - Supreme Commander-in-Chief of the Imperial Japanese Army and Navy
- Imperial Japanese Army
  - Marshal-General of the Imperial Japanese Army
  - Imperial Japanese Army General Staff
  - Imperial Japanese Army Air Service
    - Imperial Japanese Army Airborne Forces
  - Imperial Japanese Army Military Police
  - Imperial Guard of Japan
- Imperial Japanese Navy
  - Marshal-Admiral of the Imperial Japanese Navy
  - Imperial Japanese Navy General Staff
  - Imperial Japanese Navy Air Service
  - Imperial Japanese Navy Land Forces
    - Special Naval Landing Forces
    - Imperial Japanese Navy Marine Corps
  - Imperial Japanese Navy Military Police

== See also ==
- Dissent in the Armed Forces of the Empire of Japan
- Military history of Japan
- List of Japanese government and military commanders of World War II
- List of Japanese military equipment of World War II

== Bibliography ==
- Harries, Meirion (1991). Soldiers of the sun : the rise and fall of the Imperial Japanese Army. New York: Random House. ISBN 0394569350.
