= Matsukata Masayoshi =

Prime Minister of Japan (1891–1892, 1896–1898)

Junior First Rank Prince Matsukata Masayoshi
- 松方 正義
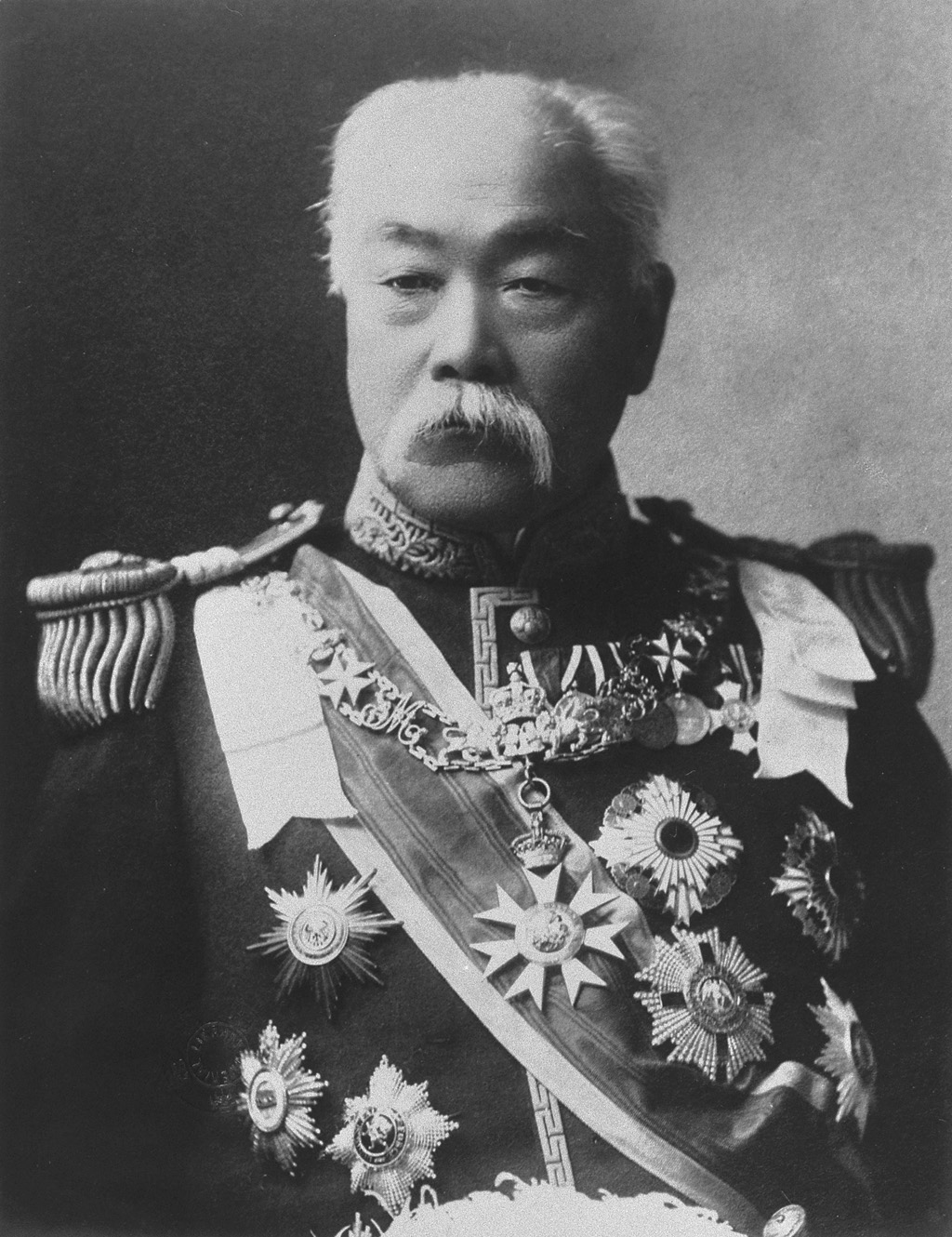

Prime Minister of Japan
- In office 18 September 1896 – 12 January 1898
- Monarch: Meiji
- Preceded by: Itō Hirobumi; Kuroda Kiyotaka (acting)
- Succeeded by: Itō Hirobumi
- In office 6 May 1891 – 8 August 1892
- Monarch: Meiji
- Preceded by: Yamagata Aritomo
- Succeeded by: Itō Hirobumi

Lord Keeper of the Privy Seal
- In office 2 May 1917 – 18 September 1922
- Monarch: Taishō
- Preceded by: Ōyama Iwao
- Succeeded by: Hirata Tosuke
Ministerial offices
Minister of Finance
In office 8 November 1898 – 19 October 1900
Prime Minister	Yamagata Aritomo
Preceded by	Matsuda Masahisa
Succeeded by	Watanabe Kunitake
In office 18 September 1896 – 12 January 1898
Prime Minister	Himself
Preceded by	Watanabe Kunitake
Succeeded by	Inoue Kaoru
In office 17 March 1895 – 27 August 1895
Prime Minister	Itō Hirobumi
Preceded by	Watanabe Kunitake
Succeeded by	Watanabe Kunitake
In office 22 December 1885 – 8 August 1892
Prime Minister	Itō Hirobumi; Kuroda Kiyotaka; Yamagata Aritomo; Himself
Preceded by	Himself (as Lord Treasurer)
Succeeded by	Watanabe Kunitake
Minister of Home Affairs
In office 8 June 1892 – 14 July 1892
Prime Minister	Himself
Preceded by	Soejima Taneomi
Succeeded by	Kōno Togama
Lord Treasurer
In office 21 October 1881 – 22 December 1885
Monarch	Meiji
Preceded by	Sano Tsunetami
Succeeded by	Himself (as Minister of Finance)
Lord of Home Affairs
In office 28 February 1880 – 21 October 1881
Monarch	Meiji
Preceded by	Itō Hirobumi
Succeeded by	Yamada Akiyoshi

Member of the Privy Council
- In office 13 July 1903 – 2 May 1917
- Monarchs: Meiji; Taishō

Member of the House of Peers
- In office 21 September 1907 – 3 July 1924 Hereditary peerage
- In office 10 July 1890 – 9 July 1897 Elected by the Counts

Governor of Hita Prefecture
- In office 1868–1870
- Monarch: Meiji
- Preceded by: Office established
- Succeeded by: Nomura Morihide

Personal details
- Born: 25 February 1835 Kagoshima, Satsuma, Japan
- Died: 2 July 1924 (aged 89) Mita, Tokyo, Japan
- Party: Independent
- Spouse: Matsukata Masako (m. 1860; died 1920)
- Children: 24, including Kōjirō
- Relatives: Haru M. Reischauer (granddaughter)
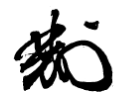
- Signature

Japanese name
- Kanji: 松方 正義
- Hiragana: まつかた まさよし
Transcriptions
- Romanization: Matsukata Masayoshi

Prince Matsukata Masayoshi (松方 正義; 25 February 1835 – 2 July 1924) was a Japanese politician who served as Prime Minister of Japan from 1891 to 1892, and from 1896 to 1898. Born in the Satsuma Domain to a samurai family, Matsukata served as finance minister for 15 of the 20 years between 1881 and 1901, led the creation of the Bank of Japan in 1882, and had significant influence in the financial and economic articles of the Meiji Constitution of 1889. He became a genrō, or senior statesman who dictated policy in the later Meiji era, and was given the title of prince in 1922.

== Early life education ==
Matsukata Masayoshi was born on 25 February 1835, in Arata, Kagoshima, Satsuma Province (present-day Shimoarata, Kagoshima, Kagoshima Prefecture), the fourth son of Matsukata Masayasu and his wife Kesaku. His family was of the samurai warrior nobility class. Both his parents died when he was 13 years old.

At the age of 13, he entered the Zoshikan, the Satsuma domain's Confucian academy, where he studied the teachings of Wang Yangming, which stressed loyalty to the Emperor. He started his career as a bureaucrat of the Satsuma Domain. In 1866, he was sent to Nagasaki to study western science, mathematics and surveying. Matsukata was highly regarded by Ōkubo Toshimichi and Saigō Takamori, who used him as their liaison between Kyoto and the domain government in Kagoshima.

Knowing that war was coming between Satsuma and the Tokugawa, Matsukata purchased a ship available in Nagasaki for use in the coming conflict. This ship was then given the name Kasuga. The leaders of Satsuma felt the ship was best used as cargo vessel and so Matsukata resigned his position as captain of the ship that he had purchased. Just a few months later the Kasuga did become a warship and it fought in the Boshin War against the Tokugawa ships.

== Political career ==
At the time of the Meiji Restoration, he helped maintain order in Nagasaki after the collapse of the Tokugawa bakufu. In 1868, Matsukata was appointed governor of Hita Prefecture (part of present-day Ōita Prefecture) by his friend Okubo who was the powerful minister of the interior for the new Meiji government.

As governor Matsukata instituted a number of reforms including road building, starting the port of Beppu, and building a successful orphanage. His ability as an administrator was noted in Tokyo and after two years he was summoned to the capital.

=== Financial reform ===
Matsukata moved to Tokyo in 1871 and began to work on drafting laws for the Land Tax Reform of 1873–1881.

Under the new system:

1. a taxpayer paid taxes with money instead of rice
2. taxes were calculated based on the price of estates, not the amount of the agricultural product produced, and
3. tax rates were fixed at 3% of the value of estates and an estate holder was obliged to pay those taxes.

The new tax system was radically different from the traditional tax gathering system, which required taxes to be paid with rice varied according to location and the amount of rice produced. The new system took some years to be accepted by the Japanese people.

Matsukata became Lord Home Minister in 1880. In the following year, when Ōkuma Shigenobu was expelled in a political upheaval, he became Lord Finance Minister. The Japanese economy was in a crisis situation due to rampant inflation. Matsukata introduced a policy of fiscal restraint that resulted in what has come to be called the "Matsukata Deflation". The economy was eventually stabilized, but the resulting crash in commodity prices caused many smaller landholders to lose their fields to money-lending neighbors. Matsukata also established the Bank of Japan in 1882, replacing the prior system of national banks. When Itō Hirobumi was appointed the first modern-day Prime Minister of Japan in 1885, he named Matsukata to be the first Finance Minister in his cabinet.

Matsukata also sought to protect Japanese industry from foreign competition, but was restricted by the unequal treaties. The unavailability of protectionist devices probably benefited Japan in the long run, as it enabled Japan to develop its export industries. The national government also tried to create government industries to produce particular products or services. Lack of funds forced the government to turn these industries over to private businesses which in return for special privileges agreed to pursue the government's goals. This arrangement led to the rise of the zaibatsu system.

Matsukata served as finance minister in seven of the first nine cabinets, and led the Finance Ministry for 15 of the 20-year period from 1881 to 1901. He is also believed to have had significant influence on drafting Articles 62–72 of the Meiji Constitution of 1890.

== Prime Minister ==
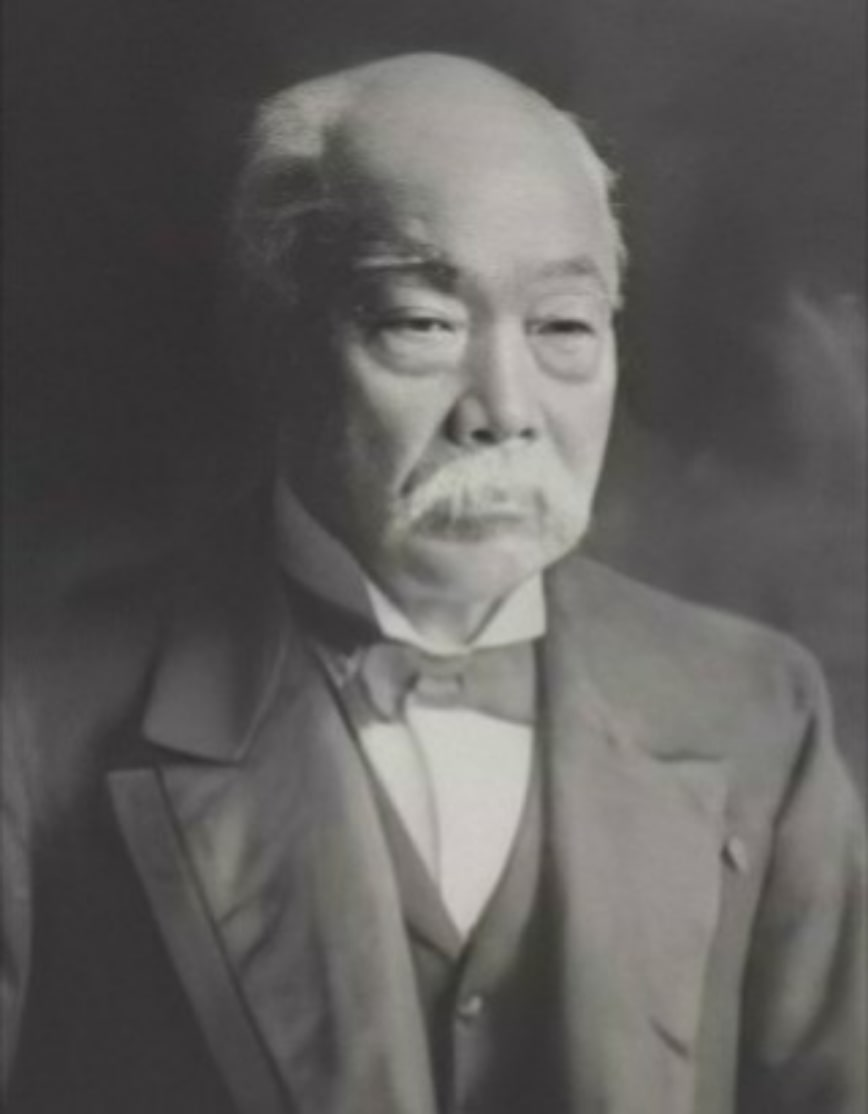
- Matsukata, unknown date
- Premiership of Matsukata Masayoshi
- Monarch: Emperor Meiji
- Party: Independent (Meiji oligarchy)
- Seat: Naikaku Sōri Daijin Kantei
- First term 6 May 1891 – 8 August 1892
- Cabinet: First Matsukata Cabinet
- Election: 1892
- Second term 18 September 1896 – 12 January 1898
- Cabinet: Second Matsukata Cabinet
- Emblem of the Government of Japan

Matsukata followed Yamagata Aritomo as Prime Minister from 6 May 1891, to 8 August 1892, and followed Ito Hirobumi as Prime Minister from 18 September 1896, to 12 January 1898, during which times he concurrently also held office as finance minister.

One issue of his term in office was the Black Ocean Society, which operated with the support of certain powerful figures in the government and in return was powerful enough to demand concessions from the government. They demanded and received promises of a strong foreign policy from the 1892 Matsukata Cabinet.

== Later life ==
Matsukata successively held offices as president of the Japanese Red Cross Society, privy councillor, gijokan, member of the House of Peers, and Lord Keeper of the Privy Seal of Japan. Later, he was given the title of prince and genrō.

In 1902 he visited US and Europe. He arrived in London from New York in late April. During his stay, he was received in audience by King Edward VII at Buckingham Palace on 2 May 1902, and received an honorary degree from the University of Oxford the following month. In July he visited Vienna and St Petersburg before returning to Japan.

== Personal life and family ==
Matsukata had many children (at least 13 sons and 11 daughters) and grandchildren. It is said that Emperor Meiji asked him how many children he had; but Masayoshi was unable to give an exact answer.

Matsukata's son, Kōjirō Matsukata (1865–1950) led a successful business career at the head of the Kawasaki Heavy Industries and K Line groups, while investing his significant personal fortune in the acquisition of several thousand examples of Western painting, sculpture and decorative arts. His intention was that the collection should serve as the nucleus of a national museum of western art. Although not achieved during his lifetime, the 1959 creation of the National Museum of Western Art in Tokyo was a vindication of this passion for art and a demonstration of the foresight which benefits his countrymen and others.

Another son, Shokuma Matsukata, married Miyo Arai (1891-1984), who, as Miyo A. Matsukata, was instrumental in introducing the Christian Science religion to Japan, and who became one of the first Japanese to engage in the public practice of Christian Science healing.

His granddaughter, journalist Haru Matsukata Reischauer, married the American scholar of Japanese history, academic, statesman and United States Ambassador to Japan, Edwin Oldfather Reischauer.

== Honours and decorations ==
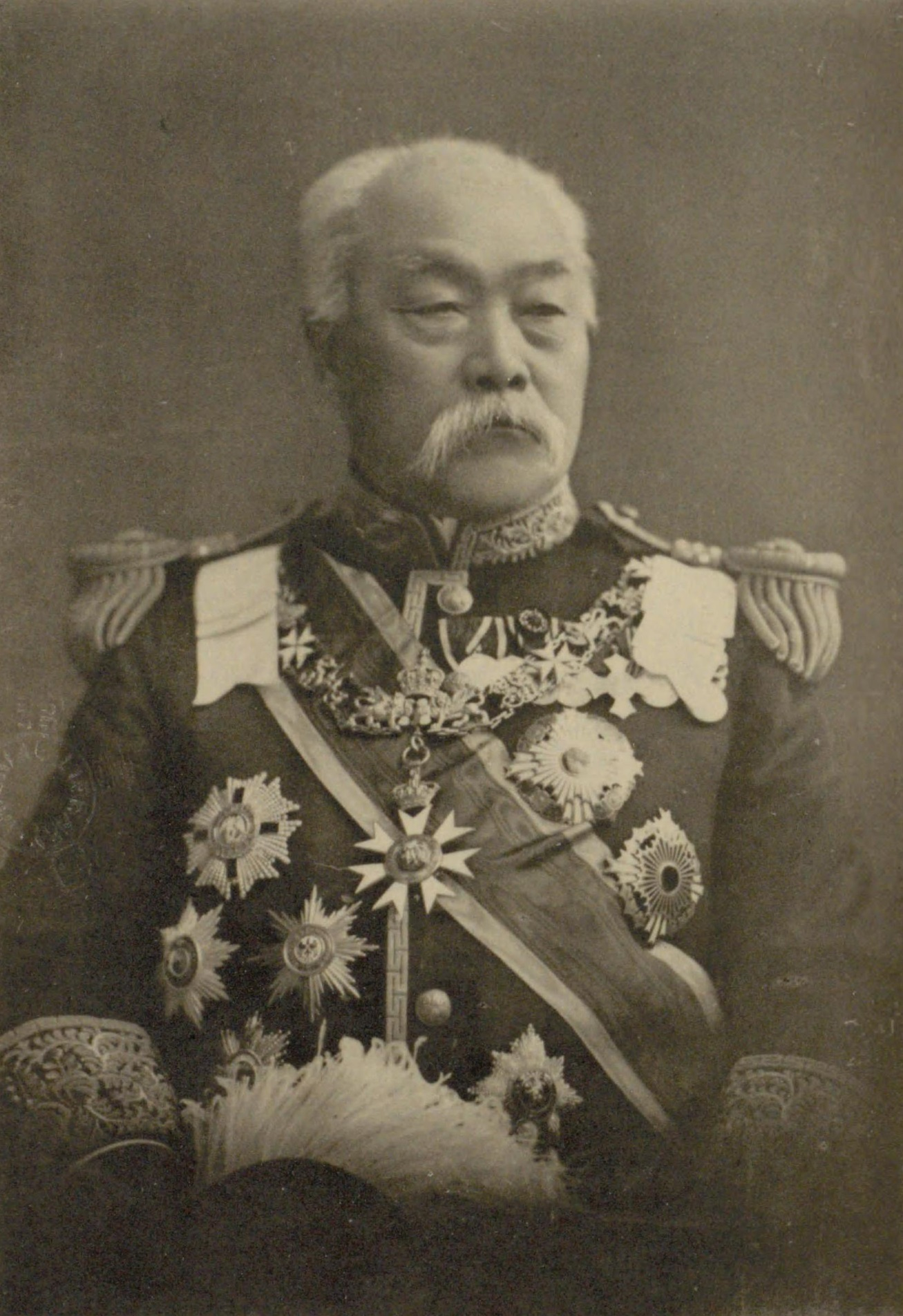
Matsukata wearing the Order of St Michael and St George

=== Titles ===
- Count (7 July 1884)
- Genrō (12 January 1898)
- Marquess (21 September 1907)
- Prince (18 September 1922)

=== Decorations ===
- Grand Cordon of the Order of the Rising Sun (22 July 1881)
- Grand Cordon of the Order of the Rising Sun with Paulownia Flowers (31 October 1899)
- Collar of the Order of the Chrysanthemum (14 July 1916; Grand Cordon: 1 April 1906)

Matsukata was named an Honorary Knight Grand Cross of Order of St Michael and St George (GCMG) in the November 1902 Birthday Honours list published to commemorate King Edward VII′s birthday, and received the insignia during a celebration of the Anglo-Japanese alliance at the British Legation in Tokyo on 11 February 1903.

=== Honorary degrees ===
- D.C.L. (honorary) University of Oxford - June 1902, during a visit to the United Kingdom

== Sources ==
- Bix, Herbert P. Hirohito and the Making of Modern Japan. Harper Perennial (2001). ISBN 0-06-093130-2.
- Matsukata, Masayoshi. Report on the Adoption of the Gold Standard in Japan. Adamant Media Corporation (November 30, 2005). ISBN 1-4021-8236-8.
- Reischauer, Haru Matsukata. Samurai and Silk: A Japanese and American Heritage. Cambridge, Massachusetts: The Belknap Press of Harvard University Press, 1986. ISBN 0-674-78800-1.
- Sagers, John H. Origins of Japanese Wealth and Power : Reconciling Confucianism and Capitalism, 1830-1885. 1st ed. New York: Palgrave Macmillan, 2006. ISBN 978-1-4039-7111-1
- Sims, Richard. Japanese Political History Since the Meiji Renovation 1868–2000. Palgrave Macmillan. ISBN 0-312-23915-7.

Political offices
New office	Minister of Home Affairs; 1885–1892	Succeeded by Kunitake Watanabe
Preceded by Yamagata Aritomo	Prime Minister of Japan; 1891–1892	Succeeded by Itō Hirobumi
Preceded by Soejima Taneomi	Minister of Home Affairs; 1892	Succeeded by Kōno Togama
Preceded by Kunitake Watanabe	Minister of Finance; 1896	Succeeded by Kunitake Watanabe
Preceded by Kuroda Kiyotaka; Acting	Prime Minister of Japan; 1896–1898	Succeeded by Itō Hirobumi
Preceded by Kunitake Watanabe	Minister of Finance; 1896–1898	Succeeded by Inoue Kaoru
Preceded by Matsuda Masahisa	Minister of Finance; 1898–1900	Succeeded by Kunitake Watanabe
