= Second Itō cabinet =

Japanese cabinet from 1892 to 1896

Second Itō Cabinet
- 5th Cabinet of Japan
- 1892–1896
- Prime Minister Itō Hirobumi
- Date formed: August 8, 1892
- Date dissolved: September 18, 1896

People and organisations
- Emperor: Meiji
- Prime Minister: Itō Hirobumi; Kuroda Kiyotaka (acting)
- Total no. of members: 24
- Member party: Meiji oligarchy Kokumin Kyōkai; Dōshi Seisha; Dai-Nippon Association
- Status in legislature: Minority
- Opposition party: Liberal Party; Rikken Kaishintō; Dōmei Seisha

History
- Elections: March 1894 general election September 1894 general election
- Legislature terms: 1892–March 1894; March–September 1894; September 1894–March 1898
- Predecessor: First Matsukata Cabinet
- Successor: Second Matsukata Cabinet

The Second Itō Cabinet is the fifth Cabinet of Japan led by Itō Hirobumi from August 8, 1892, to August 31, 1896.

== Cabinet ==
Second Itō Cabinet
Portfolio	Minister	Political party	Term start	Term end
Prime Minister	Marquess Itō Hirobumi	Independent	August 8, 1892	August 31, 1896
Minister for Foreign Affairs	Viscount Mutsu Munemitsu	Independent	August 8, 1892	May 30, 1896
Minister for Foreign Affairs	Marquess Saionji Kinmochi	Independent	May 30, 1896	August 31, 1896
Minister of Home Affairs	Count Inoue Kaoru	Independent	August 8, 1892	October 15, 1894
Minister of Home Affairs	Viscount Yasushi Nomura	Independent	October 15, 1894	February 3, 1896
Minister of Home Affairs	Viscount Yoshikawa Akimasa	Independent	February 3, 1896	April 14, 1896
Minister of Home Affairs	Count Itagaki Taisuke	Liberal	April 14, 1896	August 31, 1896
Minister of Finance	Viscount Watanabe Kunitake	Independent	August 8, 1892	March 17, 1895
Minister of Finance	Count Matsukata Masayoshi	Independent	March 17, 1895	August 27, 1895
Minister of Finance	Viscount Watanabe Kunitake	Independent	August 27, 1895	August 31, 1896
Minister of the Army	Count Ōyama Iwao	Military (Army)	August 8, 1892	August 31, 1896
Minister of the Navy	Viscount Nire Kagenori	Military (Navy)	August 8, 1892	March 11, 1893
Minister of the Navy	Marquess Saigō Jūdō	Kokumin Kyōkai	March 11, 1893	August 31, 1896
Minister of Justice	Count Yamagata Aritomo	Military (Army)	August 8, 1892	March 11, 1893
Minister of Justice	Vacant		March 11, 1893	March 16, 1893
Minister of Justice	Viscount Yoshikawa Akimasa	Independent	March 16, 1893	August 31, 1896
Minister of Education	Kōno Togama	Rikken Kaishintō	August 8, 1892	March 7, 1893
Minister of Education	Inoue Kowashi	Independent	March 7, 1893	August 29, 1894
Minister of Education	Viscount Yoshikawa Akimasa	Independent	August 29, 1894	October 3, 1894
Minister of Education	Marquess Saionji Kinmochi	Independent	October 3, 1894	August 31, 1896
Minister of Agriculture and Commerce	Count Gotō Shōjirō	Independent	August 8, 1892	January 22, 1894
Minister of Agriculture and Commerce	Viscount Enomoto Takeaki	Military (Navy)	January 22, 1894	August 31, 1896
Minister of Communications	Count Kuroda Kiyotaka	Military (Army)	August 8, 1892	March 17, 1895
Minister of Communications	Viscount Watanabe Kunitake	Independent	March 17, 1895	October 9, 1895
Minister of Communications	Shirane Sen'ichi	Independent	October 9, 1895	August 31, 1896
Minister of Colonial Affairs	Viscount Takashima Tomonosuke	Military (Army)	April 2, 1896	August 31, 1896
Minister without portfolio	Count Kuroda Kiyotaka	Military (Army)	March 17, 1895	August 31, 1896
Chief Cabinet Secretary	Itō Miyoji	Independent	August 8, 1892	August 31, 1896
Director-General of the Cabinet Legislation Bureau	Saburo Ozaki	Independent	August 8, 1892	August 20, 1892
Director-General of the Cabinet Legislation Bureau	Vacant		August 20, 1892	September 29, 1892
Director-General of the Cabinet Legislation Bureau	Suematsu Kenchō	Independent	September 29, 1892	August 31, 1896

Following Itō's resignation as Prime Minister, Kuroda Kiyotaka became acting Prime Minister from August 31 until September 18, 1896.

Portfolio	Minister	Political party	Term start	Term end
Prime Minister	Count Kuroda Kiyotaka	Independent	August 31, 1896	September 18, 1896
Minister for Foreign Affairs	Marquess Saionji Kinmochi	Independent	August 31, 1896	September 18, 1896
Minister of Home Affairs	Count Itagaki Taisuke	Liberal	August 31, 1896	September 18, 1896
Minister of Finance	Viscount Watanabe Kunitake	Independent	August 31, 1896	September 18, 1896
Minister of the Army	Count Ōyama Iwao	Military (Army)	August 31, 1896	September 18, 1896
Minister of the Navy	Count Saigō Jūdō	Kokumin Kyōkai	August 31, 1896	September 18, 1896
Minister of Justice	Viscount Yoshikawa Akimasa	Independent	August 31, 1896	September 18, 1896
Minister of Education	Marquess Saionji Kinmochi	Independent	August 31, 1896	September 18, 1896
Minister of Agriculture and Commerce	Viscount Enomoto Takeaki	Military (Navy)	August 31, 1896	September 18, 1896
Minister of Colonial Affairs	Viscount Takashima Tomonosuke	Military (Army)	August 31, 1896	September 18, 1896
Chief Cabinet Secretary	Itō Miyoji	Independent	August 31, 1896	September 18, 1896
Director-General of the Cabinet Legislation Bureau	Suematsu Kenchō	Independent	August 31, 1896	September 18, 1896

Preceded by First Matsukata Cabinet	Cabinet of Japan; 1892–1896	Succeeded by Second Matsukata Cabinet
