= Speaker of the House of Representatives (Japan) =

Presiding officer of the House of Representatives of Japan

- 衆議院議長; Shūgiin-gichō
- Logo of the House of Representatives

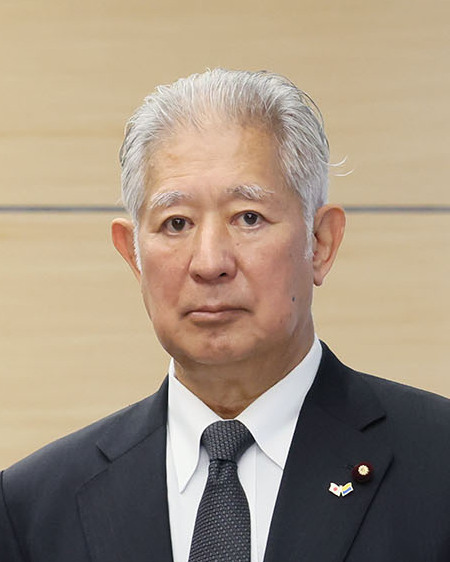
- Incumbent; Eisuke Mori since 18 February 2026
- House of Representatives
- Type: Speaker
- Member of: National Diet House of Representatives
- Residence: The Speaker’s Official Residence
- Seat: Tokyo
- Appointer: The House
- Term length: Four years; renewable only if there is a dissolution
- Constituting instrument: Constitution of Japan
- Formation: November 29, 1890; 135 years ago
- First holder: Nobuyuki Nakajima
- Deputy: Vice Speaker of the House of Representatives (衆議院副議長, Shūgiin-fukugichō); Keiichi Ishii (since 18 February 2026)

The Speaker of the House of Representatives (衆議院議長, Shūgiin-gichō) is the presiding officer of the House of Representatives of Japan, and together with the President of the House of Councillors, the Speaker is also the head of the legislative branch of Japan. The Speaker is elected by members of the House at the start of each session.

The current Speaker of the House of Representatives is Eisuke Mori, who took office on 18 February 2026.

== Selection ==
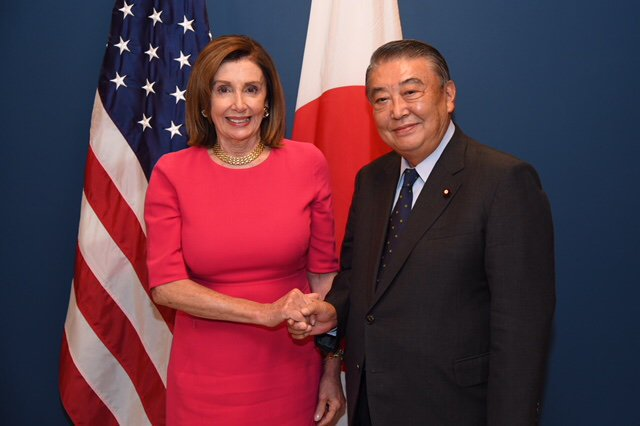
Nancy Pelosi with former Speaker Tadamori Ōshima at the G7 Brest Parliament

The election of the Speaker takes place on the day of the new session, under the moderation of the Secretary-General of the House. The Speaker is elected by an anonymous vote, and must have at least half of the votes in order to take office. If no one gets over half of the votes, the top two candidates will be voted again, and if they get the same number of votes, the Speaker is elected by a lottery. The Vice Speaker is elected separately, in the same way.

Usually, the Speaker is a senior member of the ruling party, and the Vice Speaker is a senior member of the opposition party. The current Speaker, Eisuke Mori, is a member of the ruling Liberal Democratic Party, while the Vice Speaker, Keiichi Ishii, is a member of the Centrist Reform Alliance.

== Powers and Duties ==
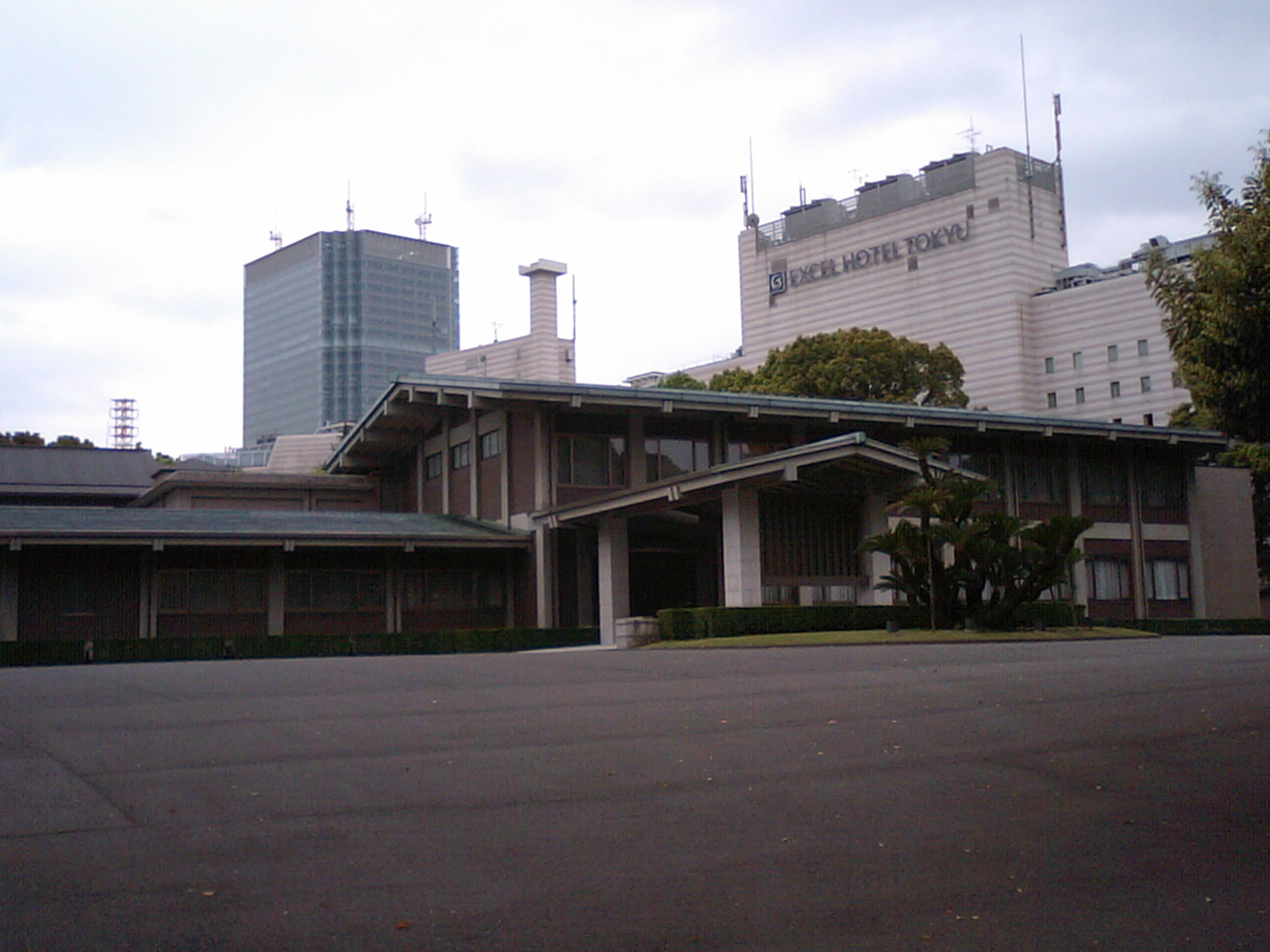
The official residence of the Speaker of the House of Representatives

According to Chapter III Article 19 of the Diet Law, the Speaker "shall maintain order in the House, arrange its business, supervise its administration, and represent the House".

The Speaker is also authorized to maintain order in the House chambers by exercising police power. Upon the Speaker's request, police personnel are sent by the National Police Agency, and are placed under the Speaker's direction. The Speaker may then order arrest or removal of a member of the House or a visitor.

According to Chapter XIV Chapter 116 of the Diet law, when a member of the House of Representatives acts in a disorderly manner, the Speaker can warn them or make them withdraw their statements. If the member does not obey these orders, the Speaker can forbid the member to speak or make the member leave the chamber until the end of the proceedings. If the chamber goes out of control and becomes over chaotic, the Speaker may also temporarily suspend or adjourn the sitting for the day.

== List of speakers ==
=== Imperial Diet (1890–1947) ===
Portrait	Name Office (Lifespan)	Term of office			Party
Portrait	Name Office (Lifespan)	Took office	Left office	Duration	Party
	Nakajima Nobuyuki 中島 信行; Rep for Kanagawa 5th (1846–1899)	26 November 1890	25 December 1891	1 year, 30 days	Rikken Jiyūtō
	Hoshi Tōru 星 亨 Rep for Tochigi 1st (1850–1901)	3 May 1892	13 December 1893	1 year, 225 days	Liberal
	Kusumoto Masataka 楠本 正隆; Rep for Tokyo 4th (1838–1902)	15 December 1893	8 June 1896	2 years, 177 days	Dōmei Club
	Kusumoto Masataka 楠本 正隆; Rep for Tokyo 4th (1838–1902)	15 December 1893	8 June 1896	2 years, 177 days	Rikken Kakushintō
	Kazuo Hatoyama 鳩山 和夫; Rep for Tokyo 9th (1856–1911)	22 December 1896	25 December 1897	1 year, 4 days	Shimpotō
	Kenkichi Kataoka 片岡 健吉; Rep for Kochi 2nd (1844–1903)	15 May 1898	31 October 1903	5 years, 170 days	Rikken Seiyūkai
	Kōno Hironaka 河野 広中; Rep for Fukushima Districts (1849–1923)	5 December 1903	11 December 1903	7 days	Kenseitō
	Masahisa Matsuda 松田 正久; Rep for Saga Districts (1845–1914)	18 March 1904	19 January 1906	1 year, 308 days	Rikken Seiyūkai
	Teiichi Sugita 杉田 定一; Rep for Fukui Districts (1851–1929)	23 January 1906	23 December 1908	2 years, 336 days	Rikken Seiyūkai
	Sumitaka Haseba 長谷場 純孝; Rep for Kagoshima Districts (1854–1914)	23 December 1908	6 September 1911	2 years, 258 days	Rikken Seiyūkai
	Ikuzō Ōoka 大岡 育造; Rep for Yamaguchi Districts (1856–1928)	24 December 1911	6 March 1914	2 years, 73 days	Rikken Seiyūkai
	Sumitaka Haseba 長谷場 純孝; Rep for Kagoshima Districts (1854–1914)	7 March 1914	15 March 1914	9 days	Rikken Seiyūkai
	Shigesaburō Oku 奥 繁三郎; Rep for Kyoto Districts (1861–1924)	17 March 1914	25 December 1914	284 days	Rikken Seiyūkai
	Saburō Shimada 島田 三郎; Rep for Yokohama (1852–1923)	17 May 1915	25 January 1917	1 year, 254 days	Rikken Dōshikai
	Ikuzō Ōoka 大岡 育造; Rep for Yamaguchi Districts (1856–1928)	21 June 1917	26 February 1920	2 years, 251 days	Rikken Seiyūkai
	Shigesaburō Oku 奥 繁三郎; Rep for Kyoto Districts (1861–1924)	26 June 1920	16 February 1923	2 years, 236 days	Rikken Seiyūkai
	Gizō Kasuya 粕谷 義三; Rep for Saitama 2nd (1866–1930)	17 February 1923	25 March 1927	4 years, 37 days	Rikken Seiyūkai
	Gizō Kasuya 粕谷 義三; Rep for Saitama 2nd (1866–1930)	17 February 1923	25 March 1927	4 years, 37 days	Independent
	Shigeru Morita 森田 茂 Rep for Kyoto 1st (1872–1932)	26 March 1927	21 January 1928	302 days	Kenseikai
	Motoda Hajime 元田 肇 Rep for Oita 2nd (1858–1938)	20 April 1928	14 March 1929	329 days	Rikken Seiyūkai
	Mosuke Kawahara 川原 茂輔; Rep for Saga 2nd (1859–1929)	15 March 1929	19 May 1929	62 days	Rikken Seiyūkai
	Zenbē Horikiri 堀切 善兵衛; Rep for Fukushima 1st (1882–1946)	26 December 1929	21 January 1930	27 days	Rikken Seiyūkai
	Fujisawa Ikunosuke 藤沢 幾之輔; Rep for Miyagi 1st (1859–1940)	23 April 1930	13 April 1931	356 days	Rikken Minseitō
	Kejirō Nakamura 中村 啓次郎; Rep for Wakayama 1st (1867–1937)	26 December 1931	21 January 1932	27 days	Rikken Minseitō
	Kiyoshi Akita 秋田 清 Rep for Tokushima 2nd (1881–1944)	18 March 1932	13 December 1932	271 days	Rikken Seiyūkai
	Kunimatsu Hamada 浜田 国松; Rep for Mie 2nd (1868–1939)	24 December 1932	21 January 1936	3 years, 29 days	Rikken Seiyūkai
	Kōjirō Tomita 富田 幸次郎; Rep for Kochi 1st (1872–1938)	1 May 1936	31 March 1937	335 days	Rikken Minseitō
	Shōju Koyama 小山 松寿; Rep for Aichi 1st (1876–1959)	23 July 1937	22 December 1941	4 years, 153 days	Rikken Minseitō
	Shōju Koyama 小山 松寿; Rep for Aichi 1st (1876–1959)	23 July 1937	22 December 1941	4 years, 153 days	Taisei Yokusankai
	Ichimin Tago 田子 一民; Rep for Iwate 1st (1881–1963)	24 December 1941	25 May 1942	153 days	Taisei Yokusankai
	Tadahiko Okada 岡田 忠彦; Rep for Okayama 1st (1878–1958)	25 May 1942	9 April 1945	2 years, 320 days	Taisei Yokusankai
	Tadahiko Okada 岡田 忠彦; Rep for Okayama 1st (1878–1958)	25 May 1942	9 April 1945	2 years, 320 days	Dainihon Seijikai
	Toshio Shimada 島田 俊雄; Rep for Shimane 2nd (1877–1947)	8 June 1945	18 December 1945	194 days	Dainihon Seijikai
	Toshio Shimada 島田 俊雄; Rep for Shimane 2nd (1877–1947)	8 June 1945	18 December 1945	194 days	Japan Progressive
	Senzō Higai 樋貝 詮三; Rep for Yamanashi at-large (1890–1953)	22 May 1946	23 August 1946	94 days	Liberal
	Takeshi Yamazaki 山崎 猛 Rep for Ibaraki at-large (1886–1957)	23 August 1946	31 March 1947	221 days	Liberal
	Takeshi Yamazaki 山崎 猛 Rep for Ibaraki at-large (1886–1957)	23 August 1946	31 March 1947	221 days	Independent

=== National Diet (from 1947) ===
Portrait	Name Office (Lifespan)	Term of office			Party
Portrait	Name Office (Lifespan)	Took office	Left office	Duration	Party
	Komakichi Matsuoka 松岡 駒吉; Rep for Tokyo 2nd (1888–1958)	21 May 1947	23 December 1948	1 year, 217 days	Socialist
	Kijūrō Shidehara 幣原 喜重郎; Rep for Osaka 3rd (1872–1951)	11 February 1949	10 March 1951	2 years, 28 days	Democratic Liberal
	Kijūrō Shidehara 幣原 喜重郎; Rep for Osaka 3rd (1872–1951)	11 February 1949	10 March 1951	2 years, 28 days	Liberal
	Jōji Hayashi 林 譲治; Rep for Kochi at-large (1889–1960)	13 March 1951	1 August 1952	1 year, 142 days	Liberal
	Banboku Ōno 大野 伴睦; Rep for Gifu 1st (1890–1964)	26 August 1952	14 March 1953	201 days	Liberal
	Yasujirō Tsutsumi 堤 康次郎; Rep for Shiga at-large (1889–1964)	18 May 1953	10 December 1954	1 year, 207 days	Kaishintō
	Tō Matsunaga 松永 東 Rep for Saitama 1st (1887–1968)	11 December 1954	24 January 1955	45 days	Japan Democratic
	Shūji Masutani 益谷 秀次; Rep for Ishikawa 2nd (1888–1973)	18 March 1955	25 April 1958	3 years, 39 days	Liberal Democratic
	Nirō Hoshijima 星島 二郎; Rep for Okayama 2nd (1887–1980)	11 June 1958	13 December 1958	186 days	Liberal Democratic
	Ryōgorō Katō 加藤 鐐五郎; Rep for Aichi 1st (1883–1970)	13 December 1958	1 February 1960	1 year, 51 days	Liberal Democratic
	Ichirō Kiyose 清瀬 一郎; Rep for Hyōgo 4th (1884–1967)	1 February 1960	23 October 1963	3 years, 265 days	Liberal Democratic
	Naka Funada 船田 中 Rep for Tochigi 1st (1895–1979)	7 December 1963	20 December 1965	2 years, 14 days	Liberal Democratic
	Kikuichirō Yamaguchi 山口 喜久一郎; Rep for Wakayama 1st (1897–1981)	20 December 1965	3 December 1966	349 days	Liberal Democratic
	Kentarō Ayabe 綾部 健太郎; Rep for Oita 2nd (1890–1972)	3 December 1966	27 December 1966	25 days	Liberal Democratic
	Mitsujirō Ishii 石井 光次郎; Rep for Fukuoka 3rd (1889–1981)	15 February 1967	16 July 1969	2 years, 152 days	Liberal Democratic
	Takechiyo Matsuda 松田 竹千代; Rep for Osaka 5th (1888–1980)	3 December 1969	27 December 1969	25 days	Liberal Democratic
	Naka Funada 船田 中 Rep for Tochigi 1st (1895–1979)	14 January 1970	13 November 1972	2 years, 305 days	Liberal Democratic
	Umekichi Nakamura 中村 梅吉; Rep for Tokyo 5th (1901–1984)	22 December 1972	29 May 1973	159 days	Liberal Democratic
	Shigesaburō Maeo 前尾 繁三郎; Rep for Kyoto 2nd (1905–1981)	29 May 1973	9 December 1976	3 years, 195 days	Liberal Democratic
	Shigeru Hori 保利 茂 Rep for Saga at-large (1901–1979)	24 December 1976	1 February 1979	2 years, 40 days	Liberal Democratic
	Hirokichi Nadao 灘尾 弘吉; Rep for Hiroshima 1st (1899–1994)	1 February 1979	19 May 1980	1 year, 109 days	Liberal Democratic
	Hajime Fukuda 福田 一 Rep for Fukui at-large (1902–1997)	17 July 1980	28 November 1983	3 years, 135 days	Liberal Democratic
	Kenji Fukunaga 福永 健司; Rep for Saitama 5th (1910–1988)	26 December 1983	24 January 1985	1 year, 30 days	Liberal Democratic
	Michita Sakata 坂田 道太; Rep for Kumamoto 2nd (1916–2004)	24 January 1985	2 June 1986	1 year, 130 days	Liberal Democratic
	Kenzaburo Hara 原 健三郎; Rep for Hyōgo 2nd (1907–2004)	22 July 1986	2 June 1989	2 years, 316 days	Liberal Democratic
	Hajime Tamura 田村 元 Rep for Mie 2nd (1924–2014)	2 June 1989	24 January 1990	237 days	Liberal Democratic
	Yoshio Sakurauchi 櫻内 義雄; Rep for Shimane at-large (1912–2003)	27 February 1990	18 June 1993	3 years, 112 days	Liberal Democratic
	Takako Doi 土井 たか子; Rep for Hyōgo 2nd (1928–2014)	6 August 1993	27 September 1996	3 years, 53 days	Socialist
	Soichiro Ito 伊藤 宗一郎; Rep for Miyagi 4th (1924–2001)	7 November 1996	2 June 2000	3 years, 209 days	Liberal Democratic
	Tamisuke Watanuki 綿貫 民輔; Rep for Toyama 3rd (1927–2026)	4 July 2000	10 October 2003	3 years, 99 days	Liberal Democratic
	Yōhei Kōno 河野 洋平; Rep for Kanagawa 17th (1937–2026)	19 November 2003	21 July 2009	5 years, 245 days	Liberal Democratic
	Takahiro Yokomichi 横路 孝弘; Rep for Hokkaido 1st (1941–2023)	16 September 2009	16 November 2012	3 years, 62 days	Democratic
	Bunmei Ibuki 伊吹 文明; Rep for Kyoto 1st (born 1938)	26 December 2012	21 November 2014	1 year, 331 days	Liberal Democratic
	Nobutaka Machimura 町村 信孝; Rep for Hokkaido 5th (1944–2015)	24 December 2014	21 April 2015	119 days	Liberal Democratic
	Tadamori Ōshima 大島 理森; Rep for Aomori 3rd (born 1946)	21 April 2015	14 October 2021	6 years, 177 days	Liberal Democratic
	Hiroyuki Hosoda 細田 博之; Rep for Shimane 1st (1944–2023)	10 November 2021	20 October 2023	1 year, 345 days	Liberal Democratic
	Fukushiro Nukaga 額賀 福志郎; Rep for Ibaraki 2nd (born 1944)	20 October 2023	23 January 2026	2 years, 96 days	Liberal Democratic
	Eisuke Mori 森 英介; Rep for Chiba 11th (born 1948)	18 February 2026	Incumbent	203 days	Liberal Democratic

== List of vice speakers ==
=== Imperial Diet (1890–1947) ===
Portrait	Name Office (Lifespan)	Term of office			Party
Portrait	Name Office (Lifespan)	Took office	Left office	Duration	Party
	Tsuda Mamichi 津田 真道; Rep for Tokyo 8th (1829–1903)	26 November 1890	25 December 1891	1 year, 30 days	Taiseikai
	Sone Arasuke 曾禰 荒助; Rep for Yamaguchi 4th (1849–1910)	3 May 1892	31 August 1893	1 year, 121 days	Chuo Club
	Kusumoto Masataka 楠本 正隆; Rep for Tokyo 4th (1838–1902)	26 November 1893	15 December 1893	20 days	Dōmei Club
	Abei Iwane 安部井 磐根; Rep for Fukushima 2nd (1832–1916)	18 December 1893	30 December 1893	13 days	Independent
	Kenkichi Kataoka 片岡 健吉; Rep for Kochi 2nd (1844–1903)	12 May 1894	2 June 1894	22 days	Liberal
	Saburō Shimada 島田 三郎; Rep for Kanagawa 1st (1852–1923)	15 October 1894	25 December 1897	3 years, 72 days	Rikken Kaishintō
	Motoda Hajime 元田 肇 Rep for Oita 5th (until 1902) and Oita at-large (from 1902) (1858–1938)	18 May 1898	28 December 1902	4 years, 225 days	Kokumin Kyōkai
	Motoda Hajime 元田 肇 Rep for Oita 5th (until 1902) and Oita at-large (from 1902) (1858–1938)	18 May 1898	28 December 1902	4 years, 225 days	Rikken Seiyūkai
	Teiichi Sugita 杉田 定一; Rep for Fukui Districts (1851–1929)	9 May 1903	11 December 1903	217 days	Rikken Seiyūkai
	Minoura Katsundo 箕浦 勝人; Rep for Oita at-large (1854–1929)	18 March 1904	23 December 1908	4 years, 281 days	Kensei Hontō
	Koizuka Ryū 肥塚 龍 Rep for Hyōgo Districts (1848–1920)	23 December 1908	21 August 1912	3 years, 243 days	Rikken Kokumintō
	Naohiko Seki 関 直彦; Rep for Tokyo (1857–1934)	21 August 1912	25 December 1914	2 years, 127 days	Rikken Kokumintō
	Takuzō Hanai 花井 卓蔵; Rep for Hiroshima Districts (1868–1931)	17 May 1915	26 December 1915	224 days	Chūseikai
	Hayami Seiji 早速 整爾; Rep for Hiroshima (1868–1926)	26 December 1915	25 January 1917	1 year, 31 days	Chūseikai
	Hayami Seiji 早速 整爾; Rep for Hiroshima (1868–1926)	26 December 1915	25 January 1917	1 year, 31 days	Kenseikai
	Kunimatsu Hamada 浜田 国松; Rep for Mie Districts (1868–1939)	21 June 1917	26 February 1920	2 years, 251 days	Rikken Kokumintō
	Gizō Kasuya 粕谷 義三; Rep for Saitama 2nd (1866–1930)	29 June 1920	17 February 1923	2 years, 234 days	Rikken Seiyūkai
	Genji Matsuda 松田 源治; Rep for Oita 7th (1876–1936)	17 February 1923	31 January 1924	349 days	Rikken Seiyūkai
	Koizumi Matajirō 小泉 又次郎; Rep for Kanagawa 2nd (1865–1951)	26 June 1924	25 March 1927	2 years, 273 days	Kenseikai
	Koizumi Matajirō 小泉 又次郎; Rep for Kanagawa 2nd (1865–1951)	26 June 1924	25 March 1927	2 years, 273 days	Independent
	Gohē Matsūra 松浦 五兵衛; Rep for Shizuoka 7th (1870–1931)	26 March 1927	21 January 1928	302 days	Seiyūhontō
	Ichirō Kiyose 清瀬 一郎; Rep for Hyōgo 4th (1884–1967)	20 April 1928	21 January 1930	1 year, 277 days	Kakushintō
	Shōju Koyama 小山 松寿; Rep for Aichi 1st (1876–1959)	21 April 1930	22 December 1931	1 year, 246 days	Rikken Minseitō
	Giichi Masuda 増田 義一; Rep for Niigata 4th (1869–1949)	23 December 1931	21 January 1932	30 days	Independent
	Etsujirō Uehara 植原 悦二郎; Rep for Nagano 4th (1877–1962)	18 March 1932	21 January 1936	3 years, 310 days	Rikken Seiyūkai
	Tadahiko Okada 岡田 忠彦; Rep for Okayama 1st (1878–1958)	1 May 1936	21 March 1937	325 days	Rikken Seiyūkai
	Tsuneo Kanemitsu 金光 庸夫; Rep for Oita 1st (1877–1955)	23 July 1937	31 August 1939	2 years, 40 days	Rikken Seiyūkai
	Ichimin Tago 田子 一民; Rep for Iwate 1st (1881–1963)	23 December 1939	22 December 1941	2 years	Rikken Seiyūkai
	Ichimin Tago 田子 一民; Rep for Iwate 1st (1881–1963)	23 December 1939	22 December 1941	2 years	Taisei Yokusankai
	Sakusaburo Uchigasaki 内ヶ崎 作三郎; Rep for Miyagi 1st (1877–1947)	24 December 1941	7 June 1945	3 years, 166 days	Taisei Yokusankai
	Eikichi Katsuta 勝田 永吉; Rep for Osaka 5th (1888–1946)	8 June 1945	18 December 1945	194 days	Dainihon Seijikai
	Eikichi Katsuta 勝田 永吉; Rep for Osaka 5th (1888–1946)	8 June 1945	18 December 1945	194 days	Japan Progressive
	Kozaemon Kimura 木村 小左衛門; Rep for Shimane at-large (1888–1952)	22 May 1946	15 February 1947	270 days	Japan Progressive
	Kozaemon Kimura 木村 小左衛門; Rep for Shimane at-large (1888–1952)	22 May 1946	15 February 1947	270 days	Independent
	Tomoharu Inoue 井上 知治; Rep for Kagoshima at-large (1886–1962)	21 February 1947	31 March 1947	39 days	Japan Progressive

=== National Diet (from 1947) ===
Portrait	Name Office (Lifespan)	Term of office			Party
Portrait	Name Office (Lifespan)	Took office	Left office	Duration	Party
	Manitsu Tanaka 田中 萬逸; Rep for Osaka 4th (1882–1963)	21 May 1947	23 December 1948	1 year, 217 days	Democratic
	Nobuyuki Iwamoto 岩本 信行; Rep for Kanagawa 3rd (1895–1963)	11 February 1949	14 March 1953	4 years, 32 days	Democratic Liberal
	Hyō Hara 原 彪 Rep for Tokyo 1st (1894–1975)	18 May 1953	15 December 1954	1 year, 212 days	Left Socialist
	Masamichi Takatsu 高津 正道; Rep for Hiroshima 3rd (1893–1974)	15 December 1954	24 January 1955	41 days	Left Socialist
	Motojirō Sugiyama 杉山 元治郎; Rep for Osaka 4th (1885–1964)	18 March 1955	25 April 1958	3 years, 39 days	Right Socialist
	Saburō Shīkuma 椎熊 三郎; Rep for Hokkaido 1st (1895–1965)	11 June 1958	13 December 1958	186 days	Liberal Democratic
	Kiyoshi Masaki 正木 清 Rep for Hokkaido 1st (1900–1961)	13 December 1958	30 January 1960	1 year, 49 days	Socialist
	Takaichi Nakamura 中村 高一; Rep for Tokyo 7th (1897–1981)	30 January 1960	24 October 1960	269 days	Socialist
	Tsurumatsu Kubota 久保田 鶴松; Rep for Osaka 4th (1900–1984)	7 December 1960	8 June 1961	184 days	Socialist
	Kenzaburo Hara 原 健三郎; Rep for Hyōgo 2nd (1907–2004)	8 June 1961	23 October 1963	2 years, 138 days	Liberal Democratic
	Isaji Tanaka 田中 伊三次; Rep for Kyoto 1st (1906–1987)	7 December 1963	20 December 1965	2 years, 14 days	Liberal Democratic
	Sunao Sonoda 園田 直 Rep for Kumamoto 2nd (1913–1984)	20 December 1965	25 November 1967	1 year, 341 days	Liberal Democratic
	Hisao Kodaira 小平 久雄; Rep for Tochigi 2nd (1910–1998)	4 December 1967	16 July 1969	1 year, 225 days	Liberal Democratic
	Sensuke Fujieda 藤枝 泉介; Rep for Gunma 1st (1907–1971)	16 July 1969	2 December 1969	140 days	Liberal Democratic
	Seijuro Arafune 荒舩 清十郎; Rep for Saitama 3rd (1907–1980)	14 January 1970	29 January 1972	2 years, 16 days	Liberal Democratic
	Shirō Hasegawa 長谷川 四郎; Rep for Gunma 2nd (1905–1986)	29 January 1972	13 November 1972	290 days	Liberal Democratic
	Daisuke Akita 秋田 大助; Rep for Tokushima at-large (1906–1988)	22 December 1972	9 December 1976	3 years, 354 days	Liberal Democratic
	Shōichi Miyake 三宅 正一; Rep for Niigata 3rd (1900–1982)	24 December 1976	7 September 1979	2 years, 258 days	Socialist
	Haruo Okada 岡田 春夫; Rep for Hokkaido 4th (1914–1991)	30 October 1979	28 November 1983	4 years, 30 days	Socialist
	Seiichi Katsumata 勝間田 清一; Rep for Shizuoka 2nd (1908–1989)	26 December 1983	2 June 1986	2 years, 159 days	Socialist
	Shinnen Tagaya 多賀谷 真稔; Rep for Fukuoka 2nd (1920–1995)	22 July 1986	2 June 1989	2 years, 316 days	Socialist
	Yoshinori Yasui 安井 吉典; Rep for Hokkaido 2nd (1915–2012)	2 June 1989	24 January 1990	237 days	Socialist
	Kiichi Murayama 村山 喜一; Rep for Kagoshima 2nd (1921–1996)	27 February 1990	18 June 1993	3 years, 112 days	Socialist
	Hyōsuke Kujiraoka 鯨岡 兵輔; Rep for Tokyo 10th (1915–2003)	6 August 1993	27 September 1996	3 years, 53 days	Liberal Democratic
	Kōzō Watanabe 渡部 恒三; Rep for Fukushima 4th (1932–2020)	7 November 1996	10 October 2003	6 years, 338 days	New Frontier
	Kōzō Watanabe 渡部 恒三; Rep for Fukushima 4th (1932–2020)	7 November 1996	10 October 2003	6 years, 338 days	Assembly of Independents
	Kansei Nakano 中野 寛成; Rep for Osaka 8th (born 1940)	19 November 2003	8 August 2005	1 year, 263 days	Democratic
	Takahiro Yokomichi 横路 孝弘; Rep for Hokkaido 1st (1941–2023)	21 September 2005	21 July 2009	3 years, 304 days	Democratic
	Seishirō Etō 衛藤 征士郎; Rep for Kyushu PR (born 1941)	16 September 2009	16 November 2012	3 years, 62 days	Liberal Democratic
	Hirotaka Akamatsu 赤松 広隆; Rep for Tōkai PR (born 1948)	26 December 2012	21 November 2014	1 year, 331 days	Democratic
	Tatsuo Kawabata 川端 達夫; Rep for Kinki PR (born 1945)	24 December 2014	28 September 2017	2 years, 279 days	Democratic
	Hirotaka Akamatsu 赤松 広隆; Rep for Aichi 5th (born 1948)	1 November 2017	14 October 2021	3 years, 348 days	Constitutional Democratic
	Banri Kaieda 海江田 万里; Rep for Tokyo PR (born 1949)	10 November 2021	9 October 2024	2 years, 335 days	Constitutional Democratic
	Kōichirō Genba 玄葉 光一郎; Rep for Fukushima 2nd (born 1964)	11 November 2024	23 January 2026	1 year, 74 days	Constitutional Democratic
	Keiichi Ishii 石井 啓一; Rep for Northern Kanto PR (born 1958)	18 February 2026	Incumbent	203 days	Centrist Reform Alliance
