= Second Matsukata cabinet =

Japanese cabinet from 1896 to 1898

Second Matsukata Cabinet
- 6th Cabinet of Japan
- 1896–1898
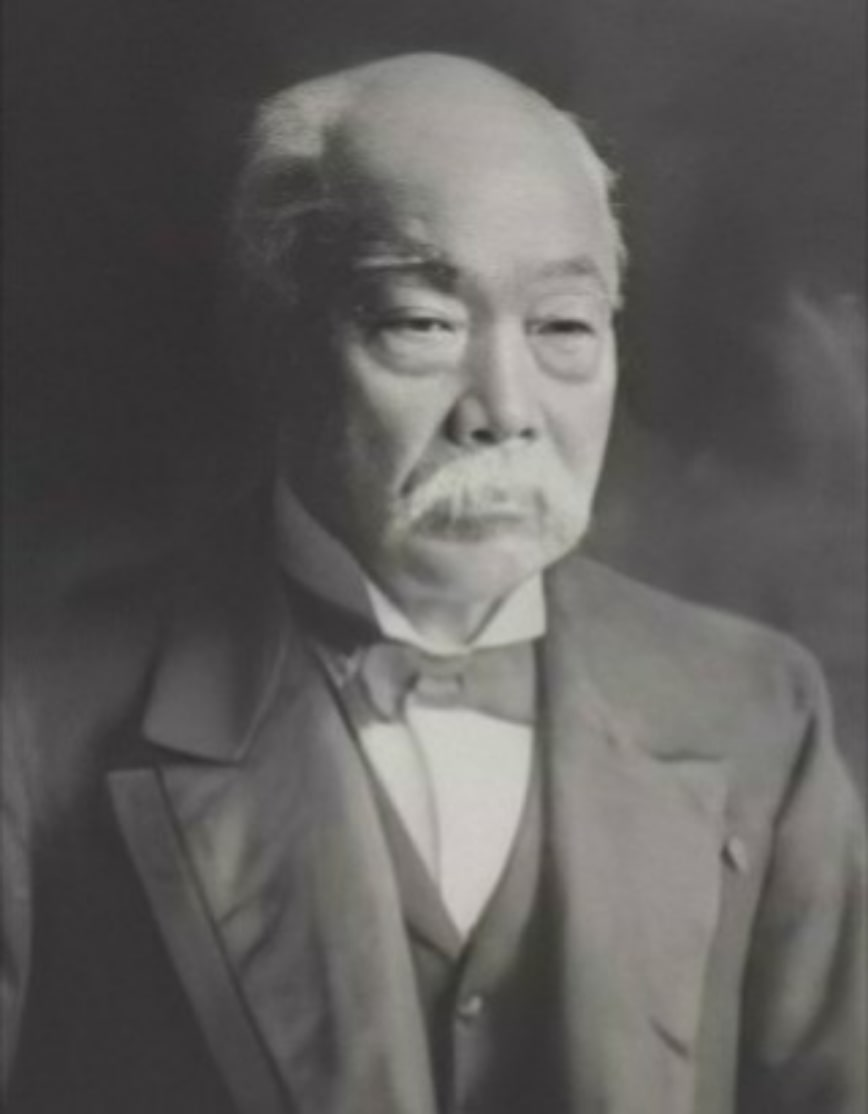
- Prime Minister Matsukata Masayoshi
- Date formed: September 18, 1896
- Date dissolved: January 12, 1898

People and organisations
- Emperor: Meiji
- Prime Minister: Matsukata Masayoshi
- Status in legislature: Minority

History
- Legislature term: September 1894–March 1898
- Predecessor: Second Itō Cabinet
- Successor: Third Itō Cabinet

The Second Matsukata Cabinet is the sixth Cabinet of Japan led by Matsukata Masayoshi from September 18, 1896, to January 12, 1898.

== Cabinet ==
Second Matsukata Cabinet
Portfolio	Minister	Political party	Term start	Term end
Prime Minister	Count Matsukata Masayoshi	Independent	September 18, 1896	January 12, 1898
Minister for Foreign Affairs	Marquess Saionji Kinmochi	Independent	September 18, 1896	September 22, 1896
Minister for Foreign Affairs	Count Ōkuma Shigenobu	Shimpotō	September 22, 1896	November 6, 1897
Minister for Foreign Affairs	Baron Nishi Tokujirō	Independent	November 6, 1897	January 12, 1898
Minister of Home Affairs	Count Itagaki Taisuke	Liberal	September 18, 1896	September 20, 1896
Minister of Home Affairs	Count Kabayama Sukenori	Military (Navy)	September 20, 1896	January 12, 1898
Minister of Finance	Count Matsukata Masayoshi	Independent	September 18, 1896	January 12, 1898
Minister of the Army	Count Ōyama Iwao	Military (Army)	September 18, 1896	September 20, 1896
Minister of the Army	Viscount Takashima Tomonosuke	Military (Army)	September 20, 1896	January 12, 1898
Minister of the Navy	Marquess Saigō Jūdō	Kokumin Kyōkai	September 18, 1896	January 12, 1898
Minister of Justice	Viscount Yoshikawa Akimasa	Independent	September 18, 1896	September 26, 1896
Minister of Justice	Kiyoura Keigo	Study Group	September 26, 1896	January 12, 1898
Minister of Education	Marquess Saionji Kinmochi	Independent	September 18, 1896	September 28, 1896
Minister of Education	Marquess Hachisuka Mochiaki	Independent	September 28, 1896	November 6, 1897
Minister of Education	Hamao Arata	Independent	November 6, 1897	January 12, 1898
Minister of Agriculture and Commerce	Viscount Enomoto Takeaki	Military (Navy)	September 18, 1896	March 29, 1897
Minister of Agriculture and Commerce	Count Ōkuma Shigenobu	Shimpotō	March 29, 1897	November 6, 1897
Minister of Agriculture and Commerce	Vacant		November 6, 1897	November 8, 1897
Minister of Agriculture and Commerce	Baron Yamada Nobumichi	Independent	November 8, 1897	January 12, 1898
Minister of Communications	Shirane Sen'ichi	Independent	September 18, 1896	September 26, 1896
Minister of Communications	Viscount Yasushi Nomura	Independent	September 26, 1896	January 12, 1898
Minister of Colonial Affairs	Viscount Takashima Tomonosuke	Military (Army)	September 18, 1896	September 2, 1897
Minister without portfolio	Count Kuroda Kiyotaka	Military (Army)	September 18, 1896	January 12, 1898
Chief Cabinet Secretary	Kenzo Takahashi	Shimpotō	September 18, 1896	October 8, 1897
Chief Cabinet Secretary	Narinobu Hirayama	Independent	October 8, 1897	January 12, 1898
Director-General of the Cabinet Legislation Bureau	Suematsu Kenchō	Independent	September 18, 1896	September 30, 1896
Director-General of the Cabinet Legislation Bureau	Tomotsune Komuchi	Shimpotō	September 30, 1896	October 28, 1897
Director-General of the Cabinet Legislation Bureau	Ume Kenjirō	Independent	October 28, 1897	January 12, 1898

Preceded by Second Itō Cabinet	Cabinet of Japan; 1896–1898	Succeeded by Third Itō Cabinet
