= Kusumoto Masataka =

Japanese politician

Junior Second Rank Baron Kusumoto Masataka
- 楠本 正隆
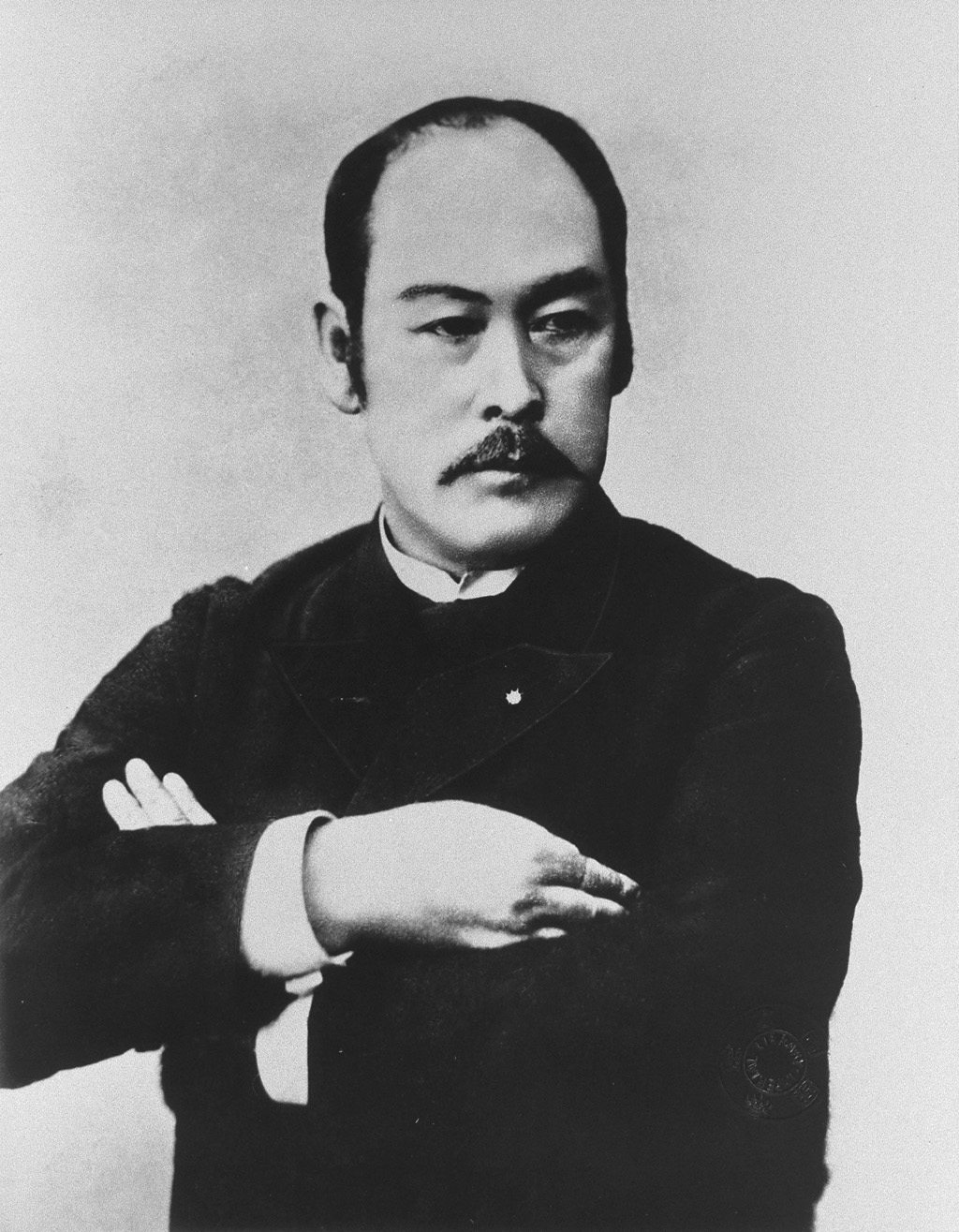

Speaker of the House of Representatives
- In office 15 December 1893 – 8 June 1896
- Monarch: Meiji
- Deputy: Abei Iwane; Kenkichi Kataoka; Shimada Saburō
- Preceded by: Hoshi Tōru
- Succeeded by: Kazuo Hatoyama

Vice Speaker of the House of Representatives
- In office 26 November 1893 – 15 December 1893
- Speaker: Hoshi Tōru
- Preceded by: Sone Arasuke
- Succeeded by: Abei Iwane

Member of the House of Representatives
- In office 17 September 1892 – 8 June 1896
- Preceded by: Fujita Mokichi
- Succeeded by: Hamaguchi Kichiemon
- Constituency: Tokyo 4th
- In office 2 July 1890 – 25 December 1891
- Preceded by: Constituency established
- Succeeded by: Kuroda Tsunahiko
- Constituency: Tokyo 1st
Additional positions
Vice Chairman of the Genrōin
In office 27 December 1889 – 20 October 1890
Chairman	Yanagiwara Sakimitsu
Preceded by	Yanagiwara Sakimitsu
Succeeded by	Position abolished
Member of the Genrōin
In office 12 December 1879 – 27 December 1889
Governor of Tokyo
In office 19 December 1875 – 12 December 1879
Monarch	Meiji
Preceded by	Ōkubo Ichiō
Succeeded by	Matsuda Michiyuki
Governor of Niigata Prefecture
In office 24 May 1872 – 7 November 1875
Monarch	Meiji
Preceded by	Hiramatsu Tokiatsu
Succeeded by	Nagayama Moriteru

Personal details
- Born: 14 April 1838 Ōmura, Hizen, Japan
- Died: 7 February 1902 (aged 63) Tokyo, Japan
- Resting place: Yanaka Cemetery
- Party: Shimpotō
- Other political affiliations: Independent (1890–1892); Dōmei Club (1892–1894); CRP (1894–1896)

Kusumoto Masataka (楠本 正隆) (14 April 1838 – 7 February 1902) was a Japanese Home Ministry government official. He was a member of the House of Representatives of the Empire of Japan and its third speaker. Previously, he was governor of Niigata Prefecture (1872–1875) and Governor of Tokyo (1875–1879). He was a recipient of the Order of the Rising Sun and the Order of the Sacred Treasure, and in 1896, he was granted the title of baron (男爵, danshaku) under Meiji Japan's European-derived kazoku peerage system.

== Bibliography ==
- 霞会館華族家系大成編輯委員会『平成新修旧華族家系大成』上巻、霞会館、1996年。

House of Representatives (Japan)
Preceded by Tōru Hoshi	Speaker of the House of Representatives of Japan; 15 December 1893 – 8 June 1896	Succeeded by Kazuo Hatoyama
