= March 1898 Japanese general election =

- 15 March 1898

All 300 seats in the House of Representatives 151 seats needed for a majority
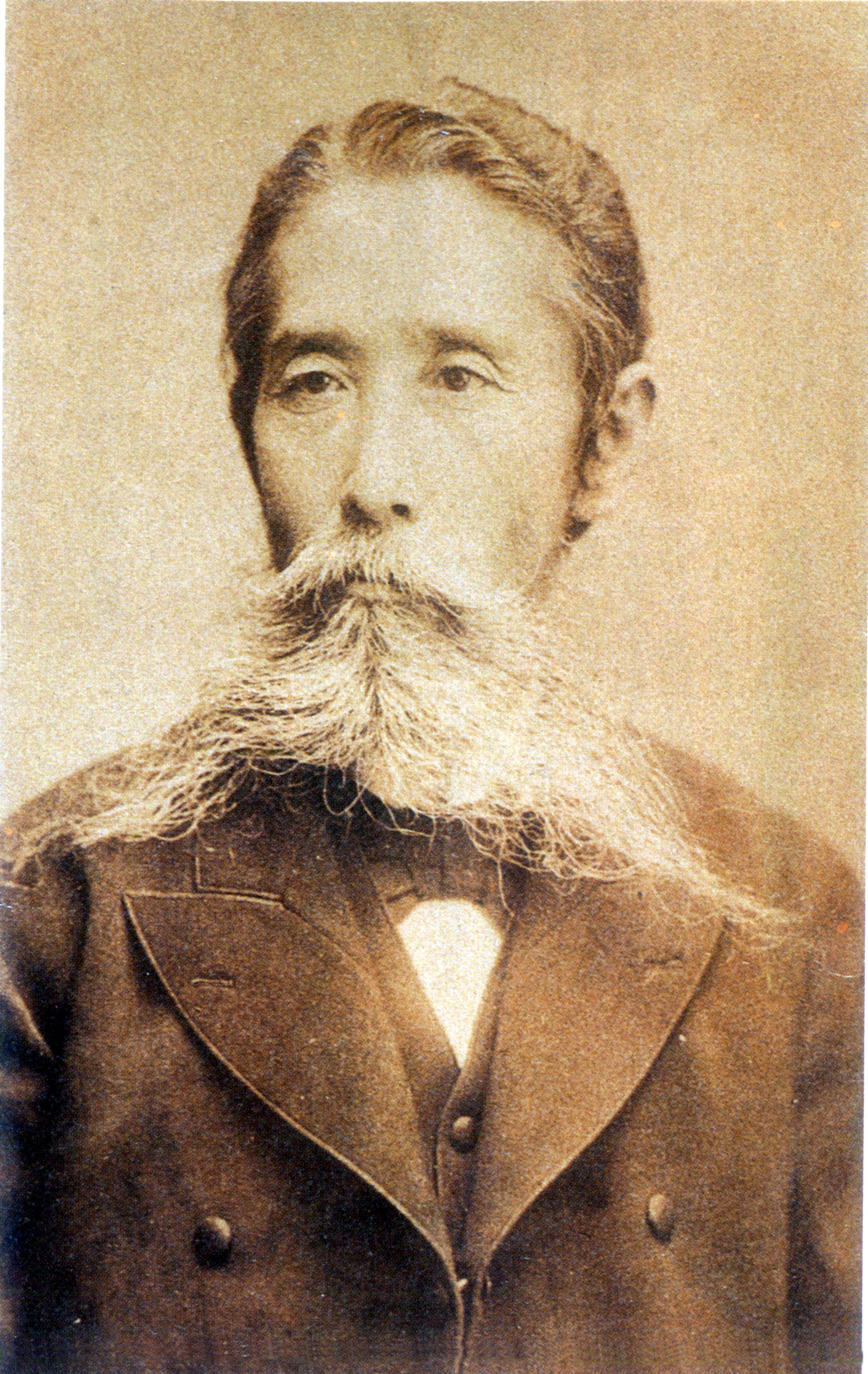

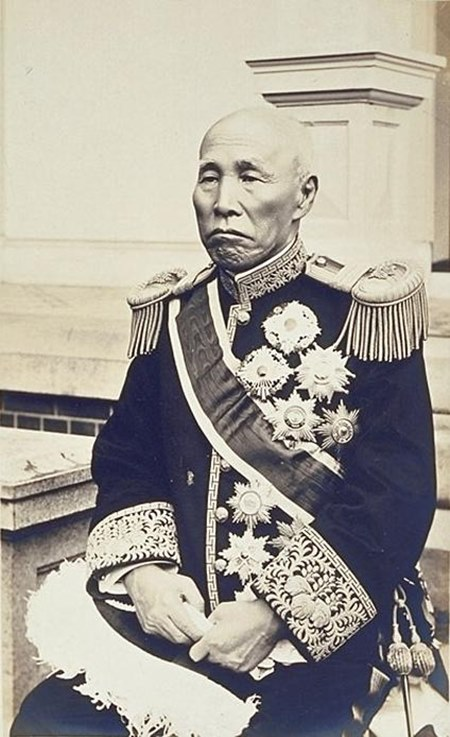

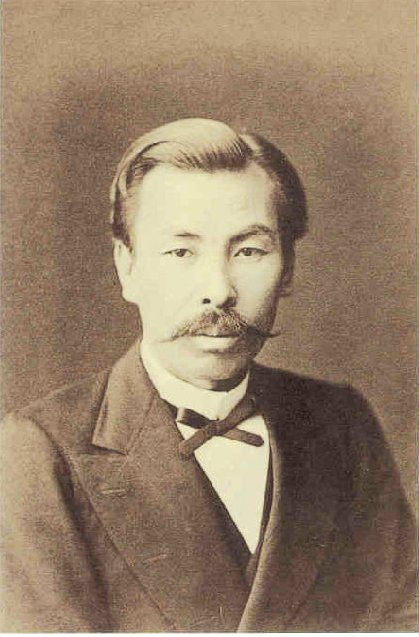
	First party	Second party
Leader	Itagaki Taisuke	Ōkuma Shigenobu
Party	Liberal	Shimpotō
Last election	107	49
Seats won	105	103
Seat change	▼2	▲54
	Third party	Fourth party
Leader	Shinagawa Yajirō
Party	Kokumin Kyōkai	Yamashita Club
Last election	32	–
Seats won	29	26
Seat change	▼3	New
Prime Minister before election
Itō Hirobumi
Independent
Prime Minister after election
Itō Hirobumi
Independent

General elections were held in Japan on 15 March 1898.

== Campaign ==
A total of 605 candidates contested the elections; the Liberal Party nominated the most with 233, Shimpotō had 174, Kokumin Kyōkai 52 and Yamashita Club 26. The remaining 118 candidates were independents.

== Results ==
Party	Votes	%	Seats	+/–
Liberal Party			105	–2
Shimpotō			103	+54
Kokumin Kyōkai			29	–3
Yamashita Club			26	New
Independents			37	+3
Total			300	0
Total votes	396,046	–		
Registered voters/turnout	452,637	87.50		
Source: Statistics Bureau of Japan
