= September 1894 Japanese general election =

- 1 September 1894

All 300 seats in the House of Representatives 151 seats needed for a majority
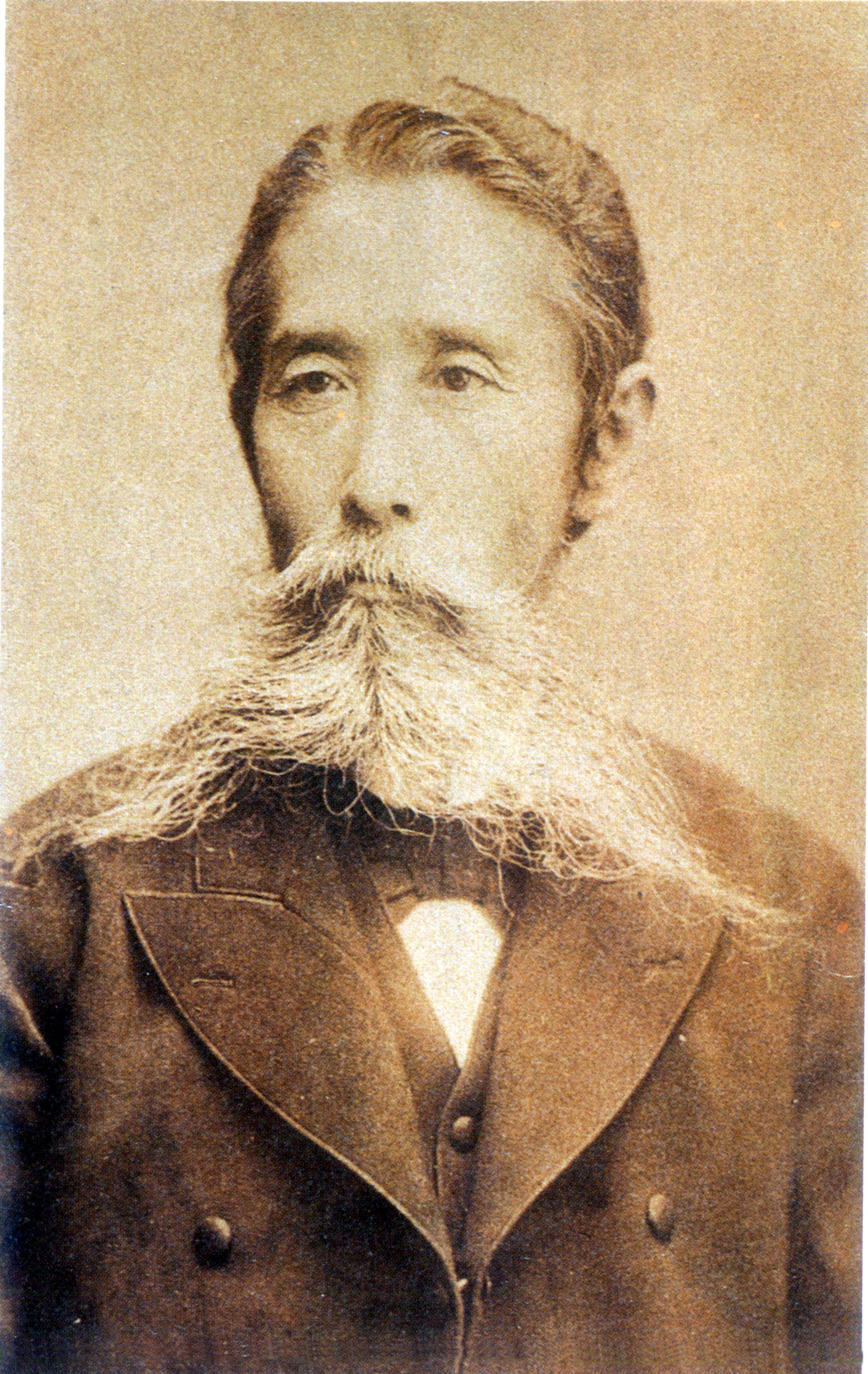

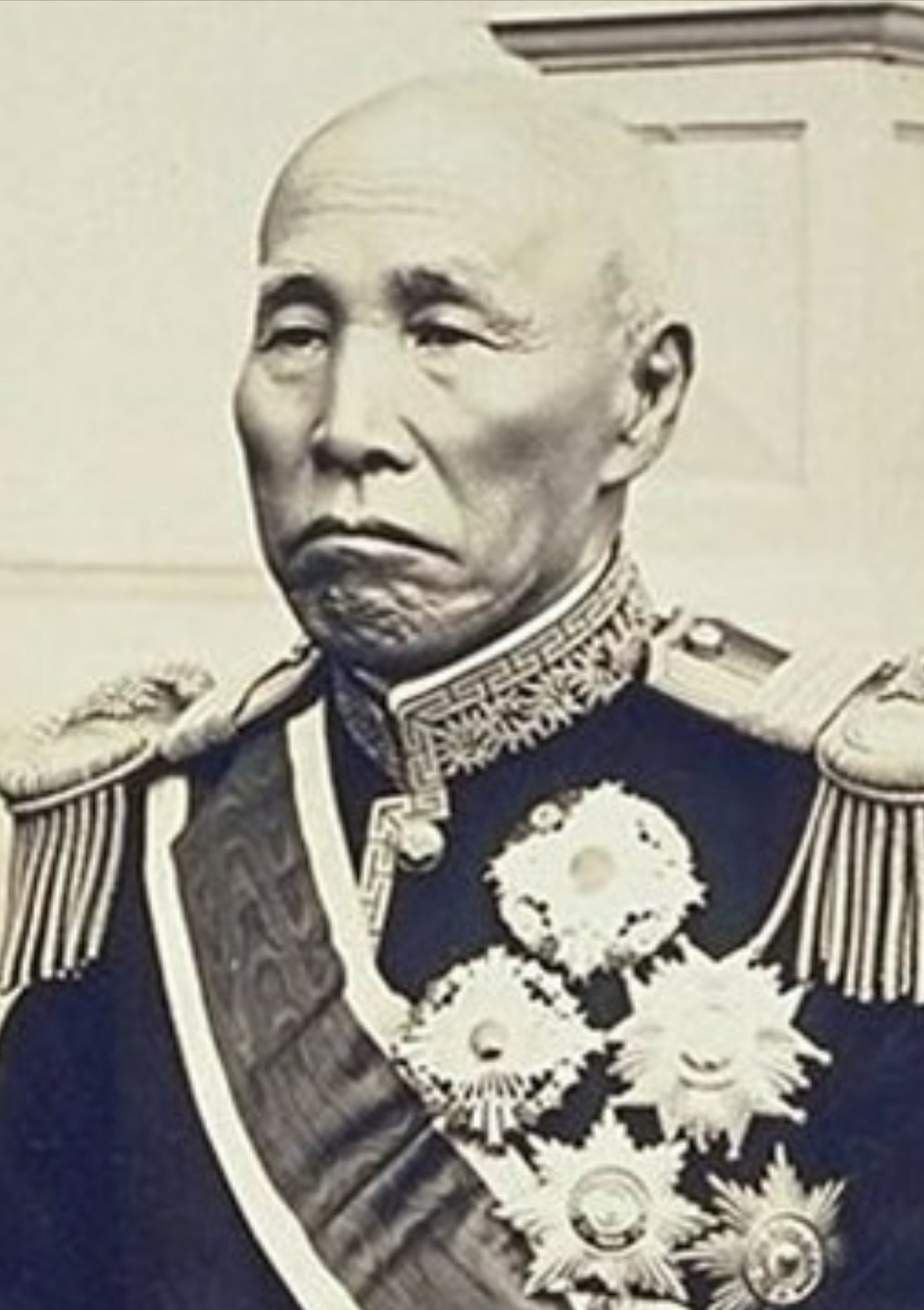

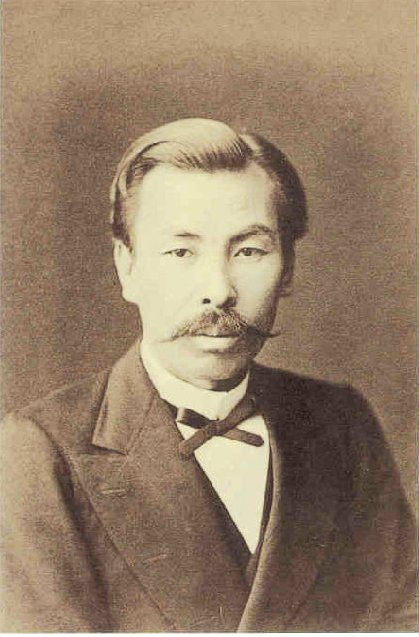
	First party	Second party
Leader	Itagaki Taisuke	Ōkuma Shigenobu
Party	Liberal	Rikken Kaishintō
Last election	120	60
Seats won	107	49
Seat change	▼13	▼11
	Third party	Fourth party
Leader	–	Shinagawa Yajirō
Party	Rikken Kakushintō	Kokumin Kyōkai
Last election	42 (Note: as Dōshi Seisha and Dōmei Seisha)	35
Seats won	39	32
Seat change	▼3	▼3
Prime Minister before election
Itō Hirobumi
Independent
Prime Minister after election
Itō Hirobumi
Independent

General elections were held in Japan on 1 September 1894. The Liberal Party remained the largest party, winning 107 of the 300 seats

== Results ==
Party	Votes	%	Seats	+/–
Liberal Party			107	–13
Rikken Kaishintō			49	–11
Rikken Kakushintō			39	-3
Kokumin Kyōkai			32	–3
Teikoku Zaisei Kakushin-kai			5	New
Chūgoku Progressive Party			4	New
Independents			64	+30
Total			300	0
Total votes	390,687	–		
Registered voters/turnout	460,483	84.84		
Source: Statistics Bureau of Japan

=== Post-election composition by prefecture ===
Prefecture	Total seats	Seats won						
Prefecture	Total seats	Liberal	Rikken Kaishintō	Rikken Kakushintō	Kokumin Kyōkai	Teikoku Zaisei Kakushin-kai	Chūgoku Progressive	Ind.
Aichi	11	2	1	2	3	0	0	2
Akita	5	0	0	3	1	0	0	1
Aomori	4	0	0	4	0	0	0	0
Chiba	9	6	1	1	0	0	0	1
Ehime	7	3	1	1	0	0	0	2
Fukui	4	3	0	1	0	0	0	0
Fukuoka	9	4	0	0	5	0	0	0
Fukushima	7	3	0	2	0	0	0	2
Gifu	7	2	1	0	2	0	0	2
Gunma	5	1	0	1	1	0	0	2
Hiroshima	10	3	1	0	1	0	1	4
Hyōgo	12	7	3	0	0	0	0	2
Ibaraki	8	3	2	1	0	0	0	2
Ishikawa	6	5	1	0	0	0	0	0
Iwate	5	4	0	0	0	0	0	1
Kagawa	5	2	1	0	0	0	0	2
Kagoshima	7	0	0	4	3	0	0	0
Kanagawa	5	4	1	0	0	0	0	0
Kōchi	4	4	0	0	0	0	0	0
Kumamoto	8	0	0	1	7	0	0	0
Kyoto	7	2	1	0	0	0	0	4
Mie	7	4	2	0	0	0	0	1
Miyagi	5	4	1	0	1	0	0	0
Miyazaki	3	1	0	2	0	0	0	0
Nagano	8	5	0	1	0	0	0	2
Nagasaki	7	6	0	1	0	0	0	0
Nara	4	0	1	0	0	0	0	3
Niigata	13	2	9	0	0	0	0	2
Ōita	6	0	2	0	4	0	0	0
Okayama	8	4	0	0	0	0	3	1
Osaka	10	0	0	1	1	0	0	8
Saga	4	0	0	4	0	0	0	0
Saitama	8	3	2	0	1	0	0	2
Shiga	5	1	0	3	0	0	0	1
Shimane	6	2	0	0	0	0	0	4
Shizuoka	8	3	5	0	0	0	0	0
Tochigi	5	2	2	0	0	0	0	1
Tokushima	5	1	2	1	0	0	0	1
Tokyo	14	3	3	1	0	3	0	4
Tottori	3	2	0	0	0	0	0	1
Toyama	5	0	1	0	0	0	0	4
Wakayama	5	0	0	0	0	0	0	5
Yamagata	6	2	0	4	0	0	0	0
Yamaguchi	7	0	0	0	0	0	0	7
Yamanashi	3	2	0	1	0	0	0	0
Total	300	105	44	40	30	3	4	74
Notes: Party affiliation after the general election.
