= Eastern Liberal Party =

Eastern Liberal Party 東洋自由党
- Founder: Ōi Kentarō
- Founded: 1891
- Dissolved: November 1893
- Split from: Liberal Party

The Eastern Liberal Party (Japanese: 東洋自由党, Tōyō Jiyūtō) was a political party in Japan.

== History ==
The Eastern Liberal Party was established by Ōi Kentarō in 1891 as a breakaway from the Liberal Party after a dispute between Ōi and Hoshi Tōru; it initially had four members of the Diet. Whilst adopting a hawkish foreign policy and calling for an increase in military spending, the party also supported widening the electoral franchise and protecting workers' rights.

The party was dissolved in November 1893.
