= Chūgoku Progressive Party =

Chūgoku Progressive Party 中国進歩党
- Leader: Inukai Tsuyoshi
- Founded: 1894
- Dissolved: February 1896
- Split from: Rikken Kakushintō
- Merged into: Shimpotō
- Headquarters: Okayama

The Chūgoku Progressive Party (Japanese: 中国進歩党, Chūgoku Shimpotō) was a political party in Japan.

== History ==
The party was established in 1894 by five Okayama-based MPs who had left the Rikken Kakushintō. Led by Inukai Tsuyoshi, it won four seats in the September 1894 elections.

In February 1896 it merged with Rikken Kaishintō, Rikken Kakushintō, Teikoku Zaisei Kakushin-kai and Ōte Club to form Shimpotō.
