= Dōshi Club =

Dōshi Club may refer to:

- Dōshi Seisha, a defunct political party in Japan initially known as Dōshi Club
- Dōshi Club (1900s), a defunct political party in Japan
- Dōshi Club (1947–48), a defunct political party in Japan
