= March 1894 Japanese general election =

- 1 March 1894

All 300 seats in the House of Representatives 151 seats needed for a majority
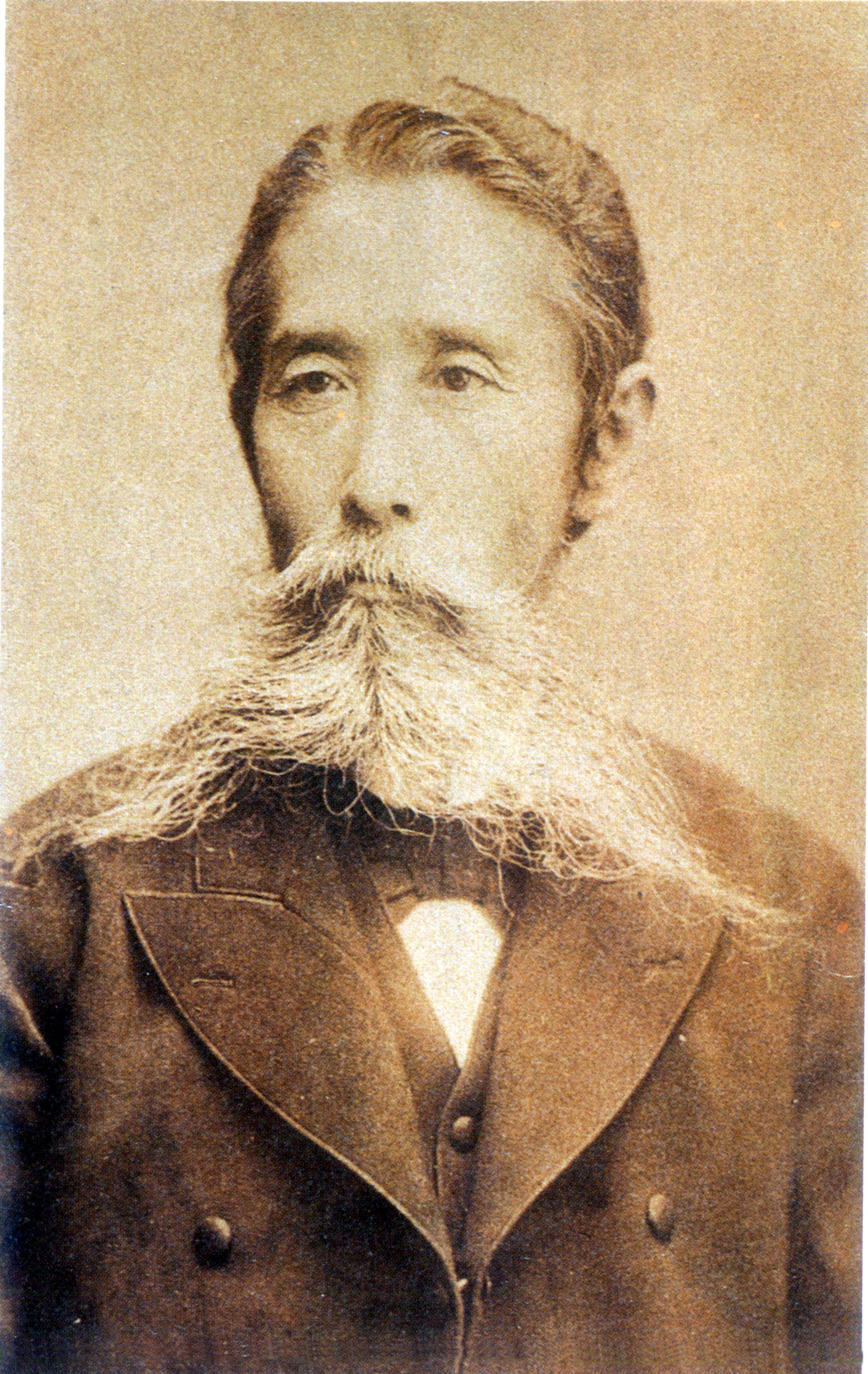

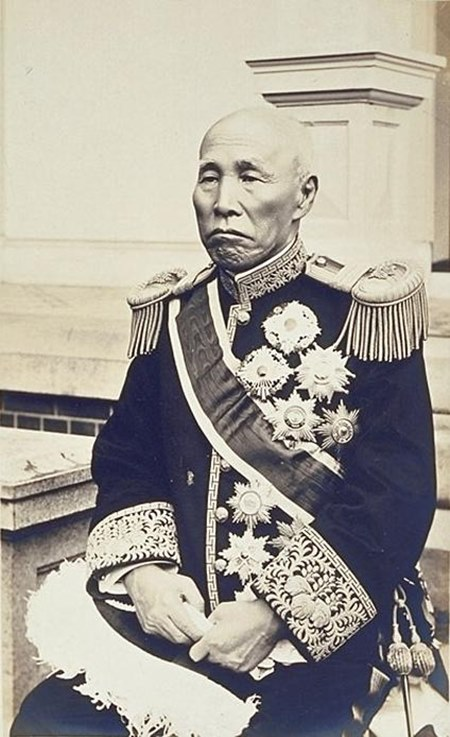

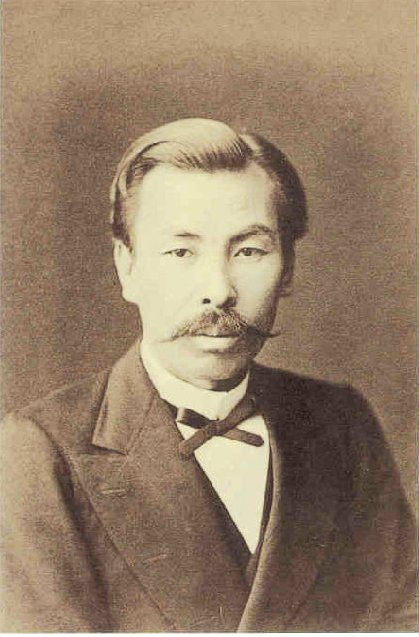
	First party	Second party	Third party
Leader	Itagaki Taisuke	Ōkuma Shigenobu	Shinagawa Yajirō
Party	Liberal	Rikken Kaishintō	Kokumin Kyōkai
Last election	94	38	–
Seats won	120	60	35
Seat change	▲26	▲22	New
	Fourth party	Fifth party	Sixth party
	Dōshi	Dōmei	Dai-N
Party	Dōshi Seisha	Dōmei Seisha	Dai-Nippon
Last election	–	–	–
Seats won	24	18	9
Seat change	New	New	New
Prime Minister before election
Itō Hirobumi
Independent
Prime Minister after election
Itō Hirobumi
Independent

General elections were held in Japan on 1 March 1894. The Jiyūtō remained the largest party, winning 120 of the 300 seats.

== Results ==
Party	Votes	%	Seats	+/–
Liberal Party			120	+26
Rikken Kaishintō			60	+22
Kokumin Kyōkai			35	New
Dōshi Seisha			24	New
Dōmei Seisha			18	New
Dai-Nippon Association			9	New
Independents			34	–10
Total			300	0
Total votes	390,644	–		
Registered voters/turnout	440,113	88.76		
Source: Statistics Bureau of Japan

=== Post-election composition by prefecture ===
Prefecture	Total seats	Seats won					
Prefecture	Total seats	Liberal	Rikken Kaishintō	Kokumin Kyōkai	Rikken Kakushintō	Dai-Nippon	Ind.
Aichi	11	6	1	2	2	0	0
Akita	5	0	0	0	3	0	2
Aomori	4	0	0	0	4	0	0
Chiba	9	7	2	0	0	0	0
Ehime	7	5	0	0	2	0	0
Fukui	4	3	0	0	0	0	1
Fukuoka	9	6	0	2	0	0	1
Fukushima	7	5	0	0	2	0	0
Gifu	7	1	0	1	1	0	4
Gunma	5	1	0	1	1	0	2
Hiroshima	10	4	2	1	0	0	3
Hyōgo	12	5	5	0	0	0	2
Ibaraki	8	4	1	0	2	0	1
Ishikawa	6	3	2	0	0	0	1
Iwate	5	3	0	1	0	0	1
Kagawa	5	3	1	0	0	0	1
Kagoshima	7	0	0	3	4	0	0
Kanagawa	5	4	1	0	0	0	0
Kōchi	4	4	0	0	0	0	0
Kumamoto	8	0	0	7	1	0	0
Kyoto	7	3	0	0	0	0	4
Mie	7	4	2	0	0	0	1
Miyagi	5	4	1	0	0	0	0
Miyazaki	3	1	0	0	1	0	1
Nagano	8	4	0	0	2	0	2
Nagasaki	7	4	0	1	0	0	2
Nara	4	1	2	0	0	0	1
Niigata	13	6	6	0	0	1	0
Ōita	6	0	1	4	1	0	0
Okayama	8	2	5	0	1	0	0
Osaka	10	0	0	2	1	1	6
Saga	4	1	0	0	3	0	0
Saitama	8	3	3	1	0	0	1
Shiga	5	2	0	0	3	0	0
Shimane	6	3	0	0	0	0	3
Shizuoka	8	3	4	0	0	0	1
Tochigi	5	3	1	0	0	1	0
Tokushima	5	1	4	0	0	0	0
Tokyo	14	2	6	0	0	0	6
Tottori	3	0	0	0	0	0	3
Toyama	5	0	3	0	0	1	1
Wakayama	5	1	0	0	0	0	4
Yamagata	6	4	0	0	0	0	2
Yamaguchi	7	0	0	1	0	0	6
Yamanashi	3	2	0	0	1	0	0
Total	300	118	53	27	35	4	63
Notes: Party affiliation after the general election.; Dōshi Seisha and Dōmei Seisha merged to form Rikken Kakushintō.
