= Hoshi Tōru =

Japanese politician

Junior Third Rank Hoshi Tōru
- 星 亨
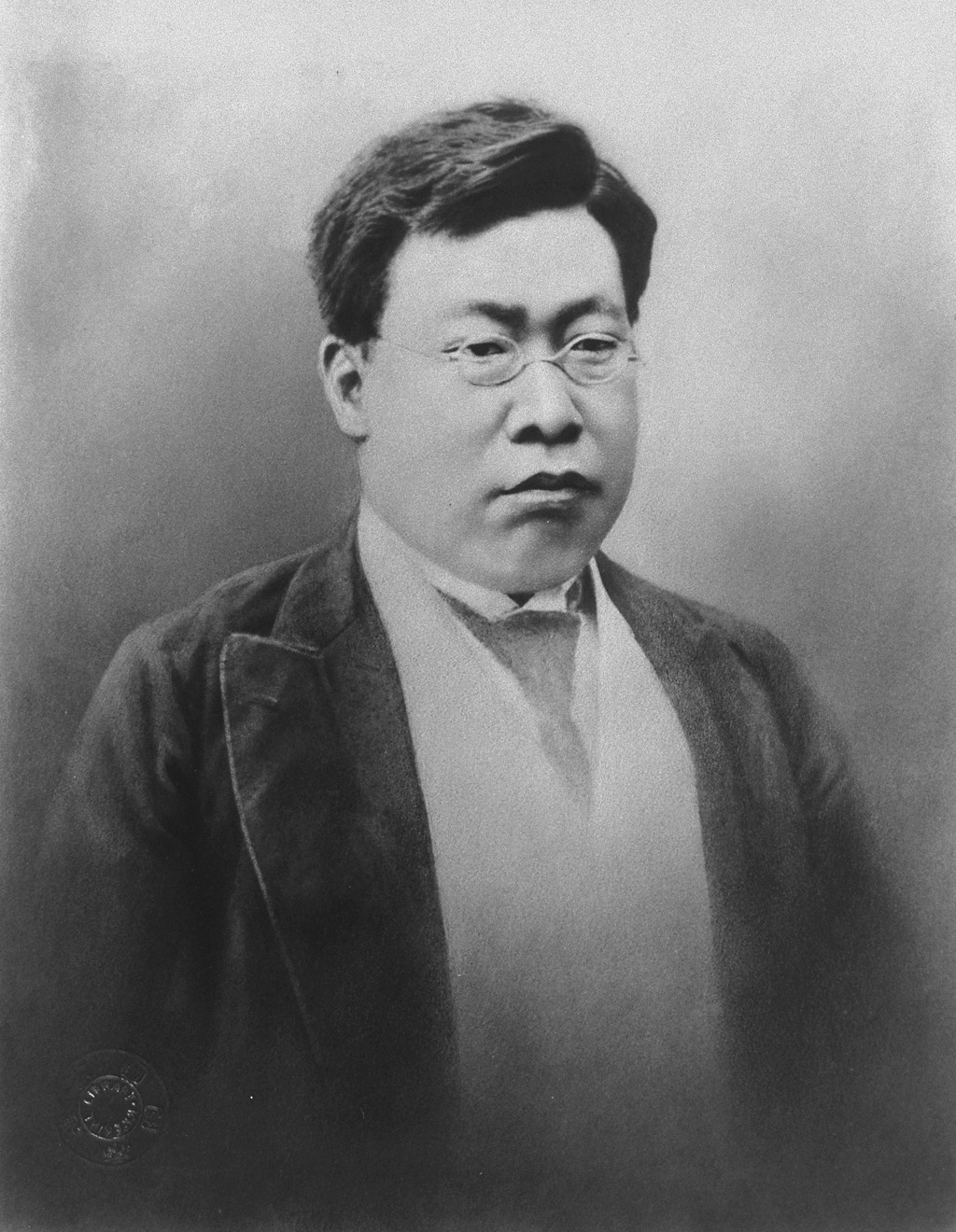

Minister of Communications
- In office 19 October 1900 – 21 December 1900
- Prime Minister: Itō Hirobumi
- Preceded by: Yoshikawa Akimasa
- Succeeded by: Hara Takashi

Speaker of the House of Representatives
- In office 3 May 1892 – 13 December 1893
- Monarch: Meiji
- Deputy: Sone Arasuke; Kusumoto Masataka
- Preceded by: Nakajima Nobuyuki
- Succeeded by: Kusumoto Masataka

Member of the House of Representatives
- In office 10 August 1898 – 21 June 1901
- Preceded by: Nozawa Takenosuke
- Succeeded by: Wakasa Mochida
- Constituency: Tochigi 1st
- In office 15 February 1892 – 8 January 1897
- Preceded by: Yokobori Sanshi
- Succeeded by: Tanjirō Nakayama
- Constituency: Tochigi 1st

Personal details
- Born: 19 May 1850 Edo, Japan
- Died: 21 June 1901 (aged 51) Tokyo, Japan
- Party: Rikken Seiyūkai (1900–1901)
- Other political affiliations: Jiyūtō (1882–1884); Rikken Jiyūtō (1892–1898); Kenseitō (1898–1900)
- Education: Middle Temple

Hoshi Tōru (星 亨; 19 May 1850 – 21 June 1901) was a Japanese politician and cabinet minister in Meiji period Japan.

== Early life and education ==
Hoshi was born in Edo in what is now part of Tsukiji, Tokyo; little is known about his biological father other than that he was a plasterer. His mother remarried to a medical doctor in Uraga, and he adopted the Hoshi surname. Initially intending to pursue a career in medicine, he learned English at Yokohama, and eventually became an English language instructor. He travelled to England, where he studied at the Middle Temple, and in 1877 became the first Japanese to qualify as a barrister in the United Kingdom.

== Career ==
After the Meiji Restoration, he enjoyed the patronage of Mutsu Munemitsu and entered into the service of the new Meiji government, serving as head of the Yokohama Customs Office. At one point he precipitated a minor diplomatic incident over a disagreement with British minister Harry Smith Parkes over what kanji to use in translating the title of “queen” as in Queen Victoria, and refusing to agree to Parkes's position, resigned his post.

On his return to Japan from England, Hoshi entered the Ministry of Justice, and was outspoken in his criticism of the hanbatsu, or clan-based politics, and what he perceived as the weak position of the Japanese government over the revision of the imequal treaties with the western powers. He was briefly expelled from Tokyo under the Peace Preservation Law and forbidden to publish in 1887 and jailed in 1888. Hoshi left Japan for the United States and Canada in 1888 soon after his release, remaining for a year, and continued on to England and Germany, only returning to Japan in 1890.

In 1892, he was elected to the House of Representatives of Japan in the 1892 General Election under the Liberal Party and became Speaker of the House in May 1892. However, he was removed from office in December 1893 following a vote of no confidence. Well versed in legal issues concerning the United States from his time as Resident Minister in Washington, D.C., from 1896 to 1898, Hoshi was scheduled to be appointed Foreign Minister under the 1st Ōkuma administration; however, due to internal political issues within the Kenseitō party, the appointment never came through. Instead, Hoshi was appointed Communications Minister in the 4th Itō administration in October 1900.

== Corruption scandal and death ==
He also left the Kenseitō to join Itō’s party, Rikken Seiyūkai. However, the same month he was accused by the newspaper Mainichi Shimbun of involvement in a corruption scandal within the Tokyo City Assembly. Although he protested his innocence, he was forced to resign three months later due to a relentless campaign against his name by the newspaper. In March 1901, he was found innocent due to lack of evidence, but during the middle of the trial he was assassinated by Iba Sōtarō (伊庭 想太郎) with a short sword.

House of Representatives (Japan)
Preceded by Nakajima Nobuyuki	Speaker of the House of Representatives; 3 May 1892 – 13 December 1893	Succeeded by Masataka Kusumoto
Political offices
Preceded by Yoshikawa Akimasa	Minister of Communications; 19 October 1900 – 22 December 1900	Succeeded by Hara Takashi
