= Rikken Kakushintō =

Rikken Kakushintō 立憲革新党
- Founded: May 1894
- Dissolved: February 1896
- Merger of: Dōmei Seisha; Dōshi Seisha
- Merged into: Shimpotō

Rikken Kakushintō (Japanese: 立憲革新党, lit. 'Constitutional Reformist Party') was a political party in Japan.

== History ==
The party was established in May 1894 as a merger of the Dōmei Seisha and Dōshi Seisha, which together had won 42 seats in the March 1894 elections, although only 40 National Diet members remained by the time of the merger. Five members later broke away to establish the Chūgoku Progressive Party.

In the September 1894 elections it won 30 seats. In February 1896 it merged with Rikken Kaishintō, the Chūgoku Progressive Party, Teikoku Zaisei Kakushin-kai and Ōte Club to form Shimpotō.

== Election results ==
Election	Leader	Seats	Status
September 1894		30 / 300	Opposition
