= Nire Kagenori =

Japanese admiral

Viscount Nire Kagenori
- 仁礼 景範
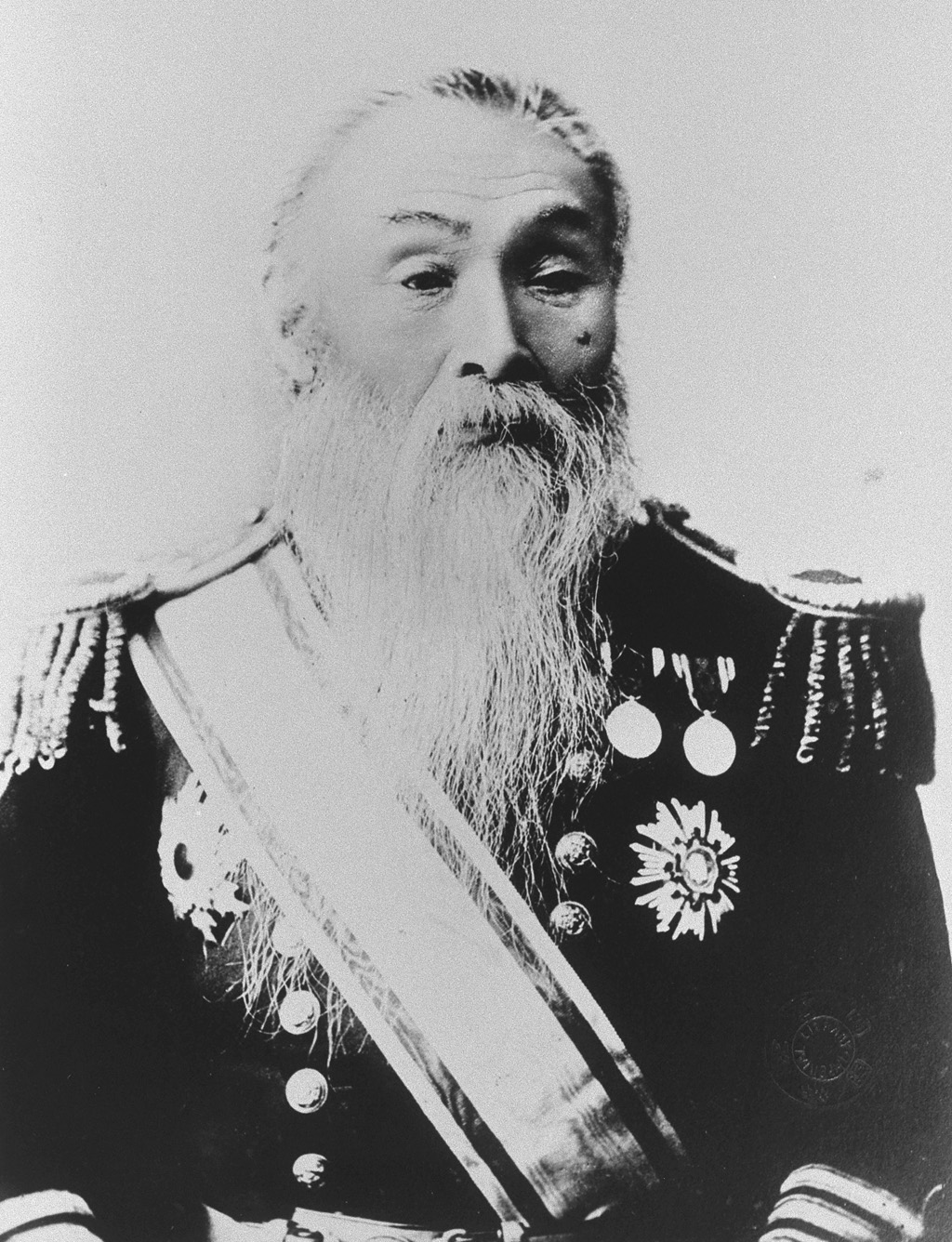

Minister of the Navy
- In office 8 August 1892 – 11 March 1893
- Prime Minister: Itō Hirobumi
- Preceded by: Kabayama Sukenori
- Succeeded by: Saigō Jūdō

Member of the Privy Council
- In office 11 March 1893 – 22 November 1900
- Monarch: Meiji

Personal details
- Born: 6 April 1831 Kagoshima, Satsuma, Japan
- Died: 22 November 1900 (aged 69)
- Resting place: Aoyama Cemetery
- Relatives: Saitō Makoto (son-in-law)

Military service
- Allegiance: Empire of Japan
- Branch/service: Imperial Japanese Navy
- Years of service: 1871–1893
- Rank: Vice Admiral
- Commands: Imperial Japanese Naval Academy, Naval Engineering Academy, Bureau of Naval Affairs, Yokosuka Naval District, Naval War College (Japan)
- Battles/wars: Anglo-Satsuma War

Viscount Nire Kagenori (仁礼 景範; 6 April 1831 – 22 November 1900) was a Japanese admiral in the early Imperial Japanese Navy, and served as Navy Minister in the late 19th century.

== Biography ==
Nire was born in Kagoshima, Satsuma Domain, what is now Kagoshima Prefecture to a samurai family. As a samurai youth, he participated in the Anglo-Satsuma War. In 1867, by order of the clan, he went to the United States to study. Following the Meiji Restoration, he joined the new Meiji government and served in various staff positions pertaining to naval matters. He served as a crewman on the frigate Kasuga from November 1873 to June 1874.

Nire was commissioned as a captain in June 1874. From December 1875 to March 1877, he was naval attaché to Pusan, Korea. From April 1878 to February 1880, he was Commandant of the Imperial Japanese Naval Academy. Promoted to rear admiral on 4 February 1880, he was subsequently commandant of the Naval Engineering Academy and the Bureau of Naval Affairs. On 7 July 1884, he was ennobled with the title of viscount (shishaku) under the kazoku peerage system.

Nire was promoted to vice admiral 29 June 1885. He became commander in chief of the Yokosuka Naval District in March 1889, and from June 1891 to August 1892 was commandant of the Naval Staff College.

From 8 August 1892 to 11 March 1893, Nire served as Naval Minister in the 2nd cabinet of Prime Minister Itō Hirobumi, where he made efforts to increase naval budgets and to build the strength of the navy for what he perceived to be a growing possibility of war with China.

Nire went into the reserves in 1893. He subsequently served on the Privy Council, and died in 1900. His grave is at Aoyama Cemetery in Tokyo. His daughter Haruko was the wife of Prime Minister Saitō Makoto. His son, Nire Kageo, was a noted entomologist who wrote numerous scientific texts on the insects of the Korean Peninsula and Taiwan.

== Notes ==
Political offices
Preceded by Kabayama Sukenori	Minister of the Navy; 8 August 1892 – 11 March 1893	Succeeded by Saigō Tsugumichi
