= 1892 Japanese general election =

- 15 February 1892

All 300 seats in the House of Representatives 151 seats needed for a majority
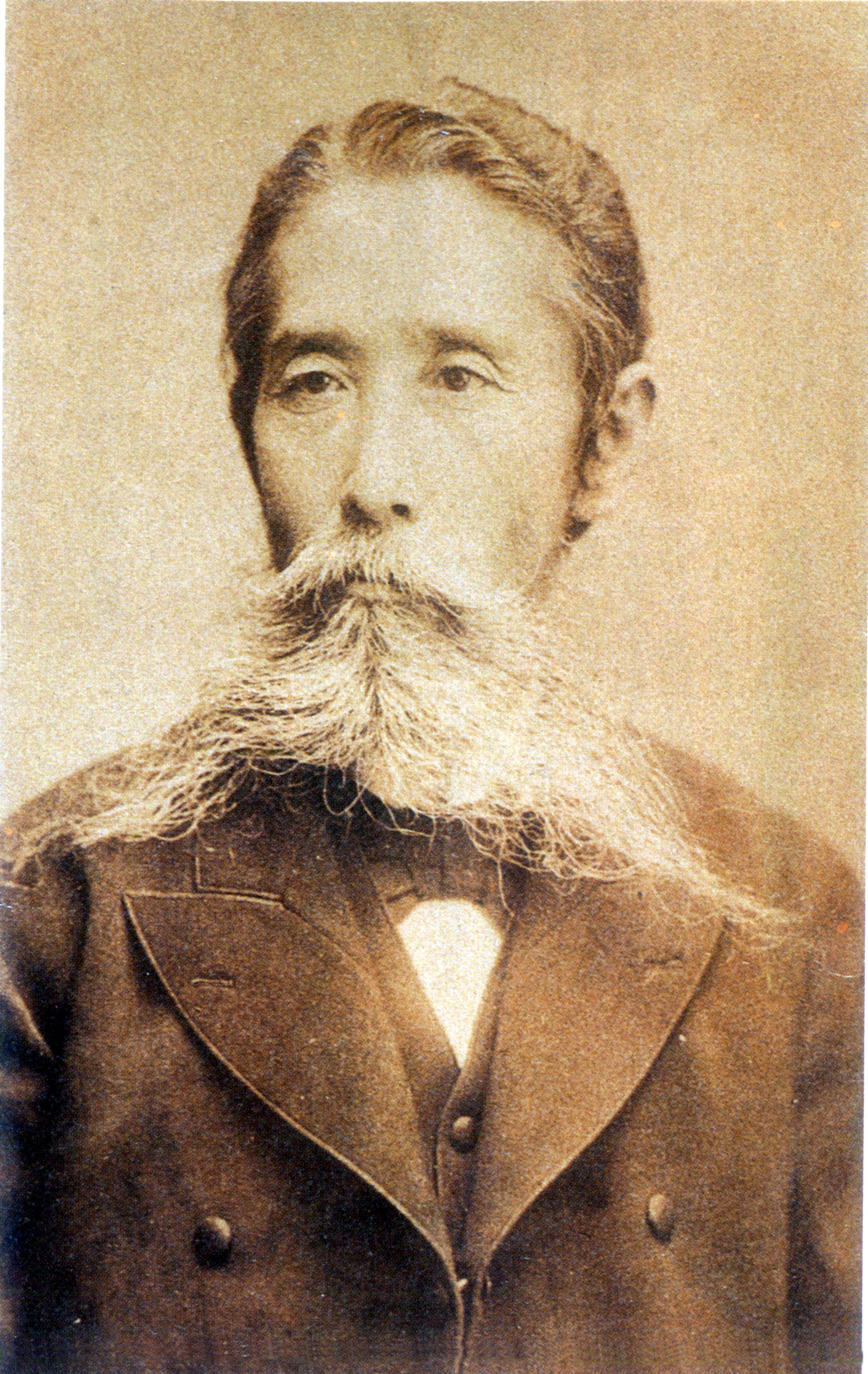

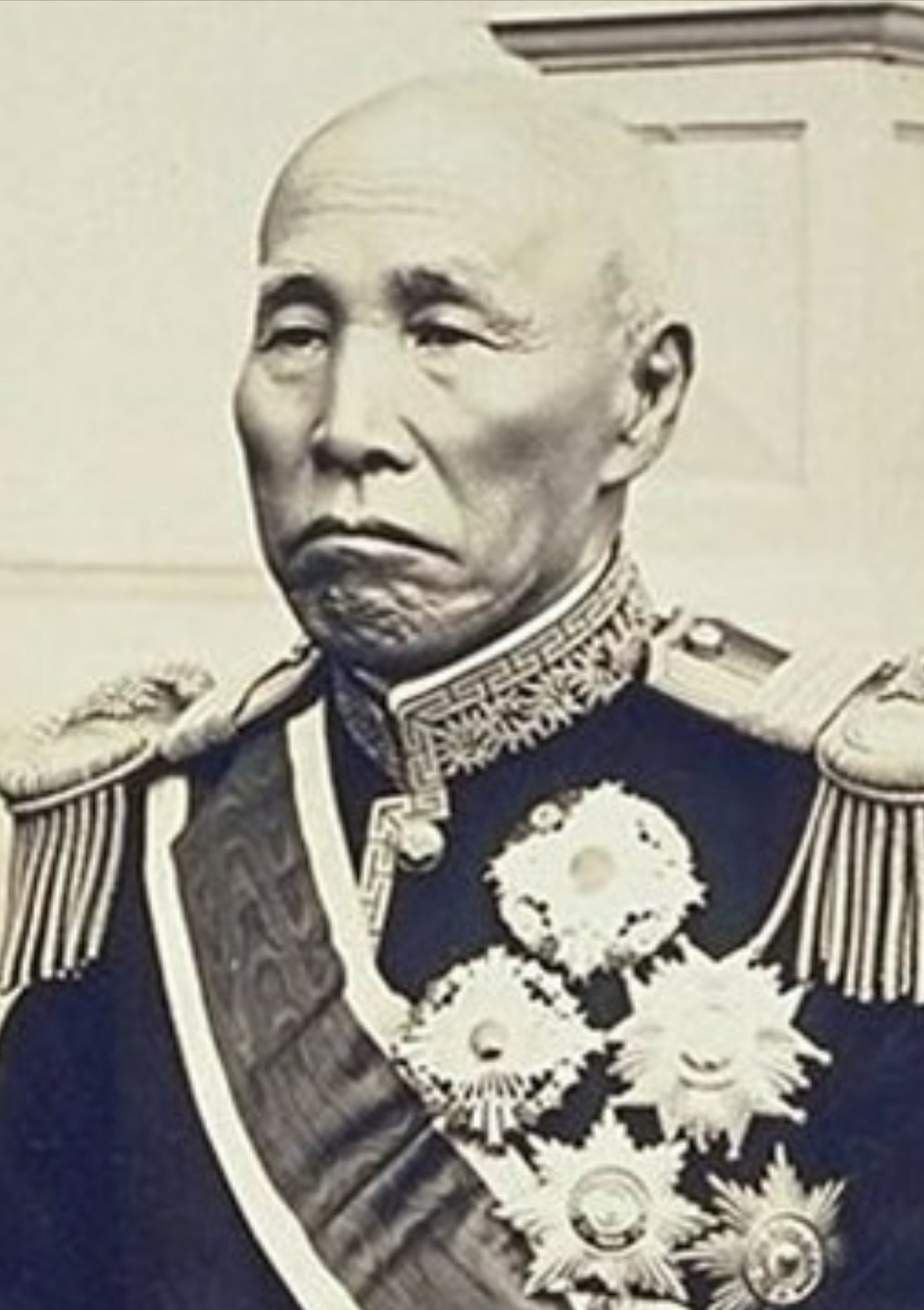

	First party	Second party	Third party
Leader	Itagaki Taisuke		Ōkuma Shigenobu
Party	Liberal	Chūō Club	Rikken Kaishintō
Last election	130	–	41
Seats won	94	81	38
Seat change	▼36	New	▼3
	Fourth party	Fifth party
Party	Dokuristu Club	Kinki Club
Last election	–	–
Seats won	31	12
Seat change	New	New
Prime Minister before election
Matsukata Masayoshi
Independent
Prime Minister after election
Matsukata Masayoshi
Independent

General elections were held in Japan on 15 February 1892 to elect the members of the House of Representatives of the Diet of Japan.

== Background ==
After the 1890 general elections for the lower house of the Diet of Japan, the elected members proved much less amenable to government persuasion than had been anticipated by Itō Hirobumi and other members of the Meiji oligarchy. Rather than docilely rubber stamp legislation issued from the House of Peers and the genrō, the leaders of the lower house used the only leverage granted to them under the Meiji Constitution, withholding budgetary approval, to show resistance. This stalemate led to earlier-than-anticipated dissolution of the government and new elections. Emperor Meiji expressed concern that if the same people were elected again, the same problem would recur, and suggested that regional offices encourage good people to run for office.

Home Minister Shinagawa Yajirō interpreted this as a condemnation of political party activity, and sent memorandums to all regional government offices encouraging the dismissal of men deeply involved in political party activity. He also instructed the police to deal severely with any acts of bribery and intimidation. However, the elections became the most violent in Japanese history, with numerous riots, in which 25 people were killed and 388 wounded. Violence was particularly severe in areas of the country with strong support for the opposition Liberal Party. Encouraged by Prime Minister Matsukata Masayoshi, Shinagawa arrested candidates he deemed "disloyal", and had gangs of toughs molest voters and burn opposition politicians' property. Prefectural governors and police chiefs were secretly ordered to disrupt campaigns of "disloyal" opposition politicians and to aid pro-government supporters. Ballot boxes were stolen in Kōchi Prefecture, and voting was made impossible in parts of Saga Prefecture; violations were most conspicuous in these two prefectures, Ishikawa and Fukuoka.

== Electoral system ==
As with the 1890 elections, the electorate was based on limited suffrage, with only male citizens 25 years of age and over, who had paid 15 Yen or more in national taxes, and who had been resident in their prefecture for at least a year, qualified to vote. The number of eligible voters who met this requirement was 434,594. The number of candidates for office was 900.

== Results ==
Despite the violence, the mintō (liberal parties) – the Liberal Party, Rikken Kaishintō and their affiliates maintained a plurality in the House of Representatives, winning 132 seats as opposed to 124 for pro-government candidates, with 44 independents.

Party	Votes	%	Seats	+/–
Liberal Party			94	–36
Chūō Club (Note: lit. 'Central Negotiation Bloc')			81	New
Rikken Kaishintō			38	–3
Dokuritsu Club (Note: lit. 'Independent Club')			31	New
Kinki Club (Note: lit. 'Kansai Club')			12	New
Independents			44	–1
Total			300	0
Total votes	398,036	–		
Registered voters/turnout	434,594	91.59		
Source: Statistics Bureau of Japan

=== Post-election composition by prefecture ===
Prefecture	Total seats	Seats won					
Prefecture	Total seats	Liberal	Chūō	Rikken Kaishintō	Dokuritsu	Kinki	Ind.
Aichi	11	1	5	0	3	0	2
Akita	5	4	1	0	0	0	0
Aomori	4	3	0	0	0	0	1
Chiba	9	7	0	1	1	0	0
Ehime	7	3	0	3	0	0	1
Fukui	4	3	0	0	0	0	1
Fukuoka	9	1	8	0	0	0	0
Fukushima	7	4	0	0	0	0	3
Gifu	7	0	5	0	0	0	2
Gunma	5	4	0	0	0	0	1
Hiroshima	10	0	9	1	0	0	0
Hyōgo	12	6	0	3	0	3	0
Ibaraki	8	4	0	1	1	0	2
Ishikawa	6	3	2	0	1	0	0
Iwate	5	1	3	1	0	0	0
Kagawa	5	2	0	3	0	0	0
Kagoshima	7	2	0	4	0	0	1
Kanagawa	7	6	0	1	0	0	0
Kōchi	4	4	0	0	0	0	0
Kumamoto	8	1	7	0	0	0	0
Kyoto	7	1	0	0	1	0	5
Mie	7	1	1	2	2	0	1
Miyagi	5	1	1	0	1	0	2
Miyazaki	3	1	0	0	1	0	1
Nagano	8	3	2	1	0	0	2
Nagasaki	7	2	5	0	0	0	0
Nara	4	0	0	0	4	0	0
Niigata	13	7	0	5	1	0	0
Ōita	6	1	3	1	0	0	1
Okayama	8	3	0	1	0	0	4
Osaka	10	1	0	0	0	9	0
Saga	4	0	4	0	0	0	0
Saitama	8	3	1	3	0	0	1
Shiga	5	0	3	0	0	0	2
Shimane	6	2	0	0	4	0	0
Shizuoka	8	4	0	4	0	0	0
Tochigi	5	4	0	1	0	0	0
Tokushima	5	1	1	1	1	0	1
Tokyo	12	0	4	4	1	0	3
Tottori	3	1	0	0	2	0	0
Toyama	5	0	1	0	4	0	0
Wakayama	5	0	0	0	5	0	0
Yamagata	6	0	5	0	0	0	1
Yamaguchi	7	0	6	0	0	0	1
Yamanashi	3	0	2	0	0	0	1
Total	300	95	79	41	33	12	40
Note: Party affiliation after the general election.

=== Parliamentary blocs ===
Session	March Club	Parliamentarians' Assembly	Central Negotiation Bloc	Independent Club	Parliamentarians' Club	Oriental Liberal Party	Alliance Club	Shiba Club	Yūraku Group	Industrial Organisation	Inoue Group	Kishū Group	Comrades' Club	Policy Research Society	Osaka Faction	Non-Affiliated	Total
3rd 6 May - 14 June 1892	94	38	95	31	0	0	0	0	0	0	0	0	0	0	0	42	300
4th 29 November 1892 - 28 February 1893	90	38	11	0	70	4	20	18	9	7	5	5	0	0	0	21	298
5th 29 November 1892 - 28 February 1893	80	42	0	0	66	4	25	0	0	9	5	5	18	20	6	19	299

== Aftermath ==
The government faced an angry lower house when the next Diet term convened on 6 May; even members of the House of Peers were outraged, issuing a resolution condemning the manner in which the elections had been held on 11 May. Shinagawa was forced to resign the following month.
