= Saigō Jūdō =

Japanese politician and admiral (1843-1902)

Junior First Rank Marshal-Admiral Marquess Saigō Jūdō
- 西郷 従道
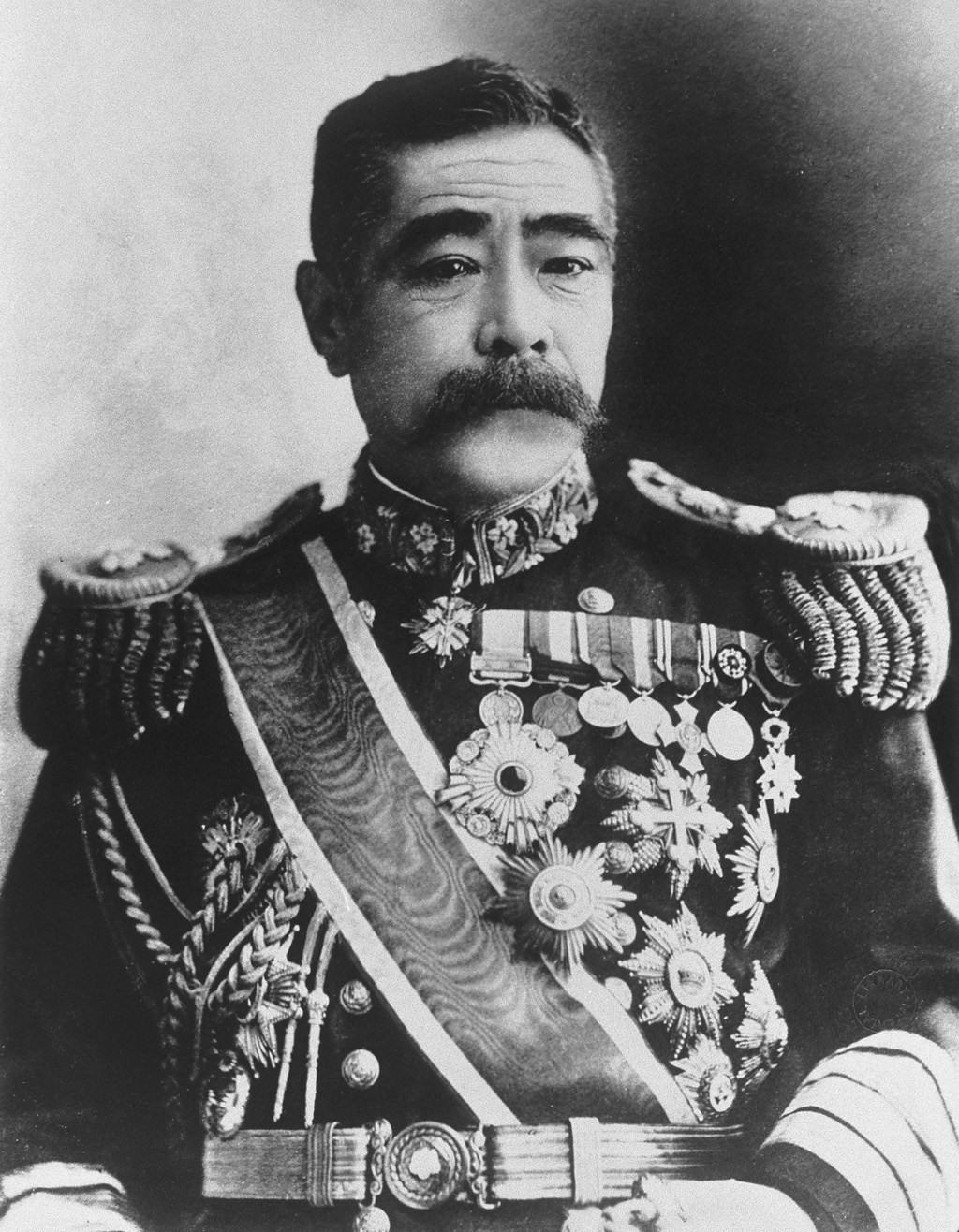

Minister of the Navy
- In office 11 March 1893 – 8 November 1898
- Prime Minister: Itō Hirobumi; Matsukata Masayoshi; Ōkuma Shigenobu
- Preceded by: Nire Kagenori
- Succeeded by: Yamamoto Gonnohyōe
- In office 22 December 1885 – 17 May 1890
- Prime Minister: Itō Hirobumi; Kuroda Kiyotaka; Sanjō Sanetomi; Yamagata Aritomo
- Preceded by: Kawamura Sumiyoshi (as Lord of the Navy)
- Succeeded by: Kabayama Sukenori
Ministerial offices
Minister of Home Affairs
In office 8 November 1898 – 19 October 1900
| Prime Minister | Yamagata Aritomo |
| Preceded by | Itagaki Taisuke |
| Succeeded by | Itagaki Taisuke |
In office 17 May 1890 – 6 May 1891
| Prime Minister | Yamagata Aritomo; Matsukata Masayoshi |
| Preceded by | Yamagata Aritomo |
| Succeeded by | Shinagawa Yajirō |
Acting Minister of Agriculture and Commerce
In office 16 March 1886 – 10 July 1886
| Prime Minister | Itō Hirobumi |
| Preceded by | Tani Tateki |
| Succeeded by | Yamagata Aritomo (acting); Hijikata Hisamoto |
Lord of Agricuture and Commerce
In office 20 October 1881 – 21 December 1885
| Monarch | Meiji |
| Preceded by | Kōno Togama |
| Succeeded by | Tani Tateki (as Minister of Agriculture and Commerce) |
Lord of the Army
In office 24 December 1878 – 28 February 1880
| Monarch | Meiji |
| Preceded by | Yamagata Aritomo |
| Succeeded by | Ōyama Iwao |
Lord of Education
In office 24 May 1878 – 24 December 1878
| Monarch | Meiji |
| Preceded by | Kido Takayoshi; Tanaka Fujimaro (interim) |
| Succeeded by | Terashima Munenori |
Party political offices
President of the Kokumin Kyōkai
In office 22 June 1892 – 4 July 1899
| Vice President | Shinagawa Yajirō |
| Preceded by | Position established |
| Succeeded by | Position abolished |

Member of the House of Peers
- In office 5 August 1895 – 18 July 1902 Hereditary peerage

Member of the Privy Council
- In office 28 January 1892 – 30 June 1892
- Monarch: Meiji

Director of the Hokkaidō Development Commission
- In office 11 January 1882 – 8 February 1882
- Monarch: Meiji
- Preceded by: Kuroda Kiyotaka
- Succeeded by: Tokito Tamemoto (as Governor of Hakodate); Chōsho Hirotake (as Governor of Sapporo); Sadamoto Yuchi (as Governor of Nemuro)

Personal details
- Born: Saigō Ryūsuke (西郷 隆興); 1 June 1843 Kagoshima, Satsuma, Japan
- Died: 18 July 1902 (aged 59) Meguro, Tokyo, Empire of Japan
- Resting place: Tama Cemetery
- Party: Kokumin Kyōkai (1892–1899)
- Spouse: Saigō Kiyoko
- Children: 11
- Relatives: Saigō Takamori (brother); Ōyama Iwao (cousin)
- Nickname: Shingō

Military service
- Allegiance: Empire of Japan
- Branch/service: Imperial Japanese Army; Imperial Japanese Navy
- Years of service: 1869–1902
- Rank: Lt. General (1869–1894); Admiral (1894–1898); Marshal Admiral (1898–1902)
- Battles/wars: Anglo-Satsuma War; Boshin War; Battle of Toba–Fushimi; Taiwan Expedition of 1874; Satsuma Rebellion

Saigō Jūdō (西郷 従道; 1 June 1843 – 18 July 1902), also known as Saigō Tsugumichi, was a Japanese politician and admiral in the Meiji period.

== Early life ==
Saigō was born in Shimokajiyachō, Kagoshima, the son of the samurai Saigō Kichibe of the Satsuma Domain. His siblings included his famous older brother, samurai and nobleman Saigō Takamori. Saigō changed his name many times throughout his life. Besides the two listed above, he sometimes went by the nickname "Shingō". His real name was either "Ryūkō", or "Ryūdō" (隆興). It is possible that he went by the name "Ryūsuke".

Following the Meiji Restoration, Saigō went to a government office to register his name. He intended to register orally under his given name (Ryūkō or Ryūdō). However, the civil servant misheard his name and he therefore became Jūdō (従道) under the law. He did not particularly mind, so he never bothered to change it back. The name "Tsugumichi" arose as an alternate pronunciation for the characters of his name.

At the recommendation of Arimura Shunsai, he became a tea-serving Buddhist monk for the daimyō of Satsuma, Shimazu Nariakira. After he returned to secular life, he became one of a group of devoted followers of Arimura. As a Satsuma samurai, he participated in the Anglo-Satsuma War. He later joined the movement to overthrow the Tokugawa shogunate.

He commanded Satsuma forces at the Battle of Toba–Fushimi, where he was shot in the neck and severely wounded. He recovered under the care of the British physician William Willis, and went on to serve in the fighting further north in the Tōhoku region as the Boshin War continued.

== Imperial Japanese Army ==
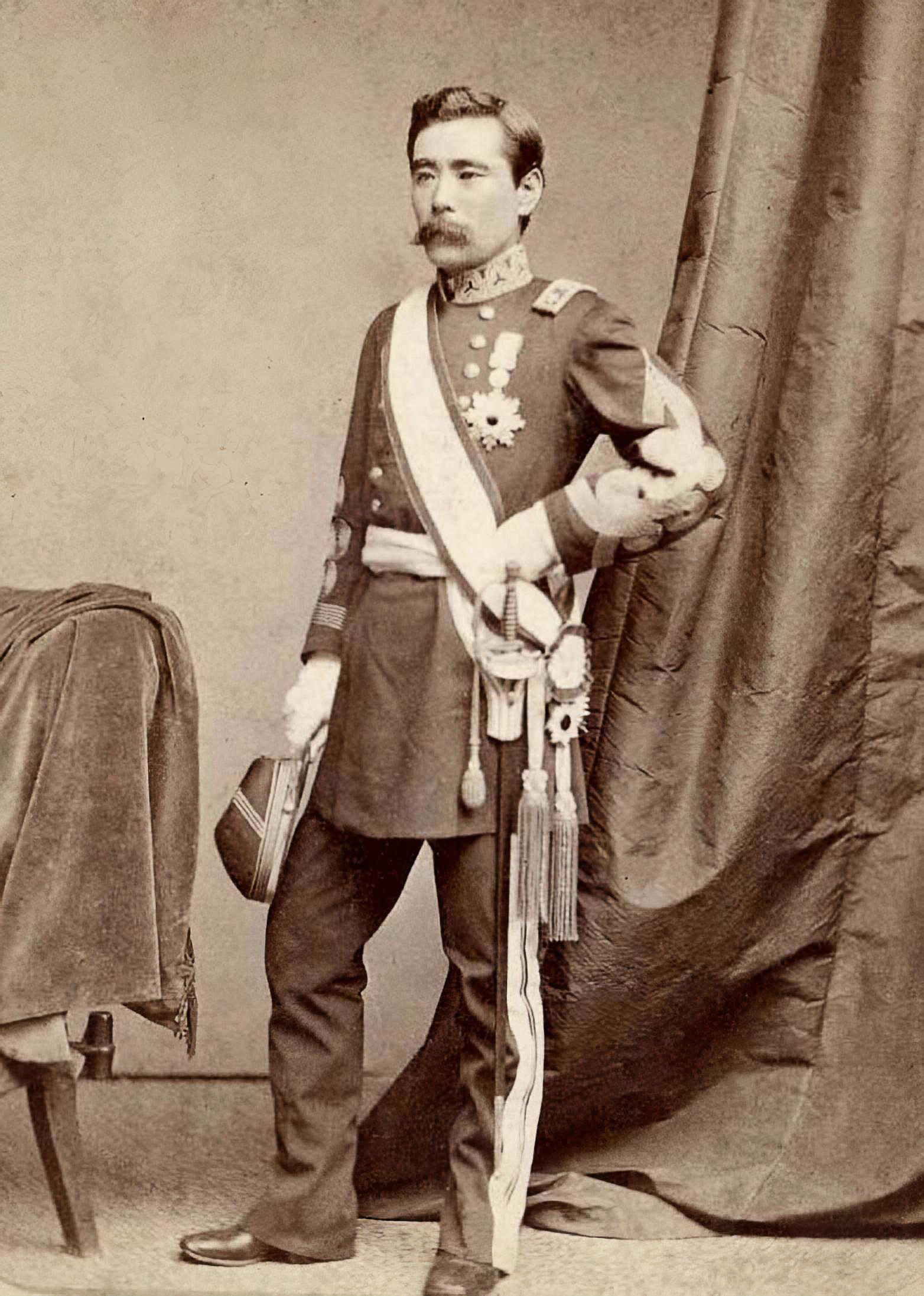
Saigo in 1876

In 1869, two years after the establishment of the Meiji government, Saigō travelled to Europe with Yamagata Aritomo to study the military systems of Prussia, France and Russia. He returned to Japan the following year and rose through a series of posts in the new military bureaucracy, eventually becoming a lieutenant-general in the Imperial Japanese Army.

In 1874 he was appointed governor-general of the office overseeing Taiwan affairs and given command of Japan's expeditionary force for the Taiwan Expedition of 1874. Britain and the United States objected to the planned expedition on the grounds it would destabilise the region, and the Japanese government moved to call it off; Saigō proceeded regardless, landing with roughly 3,600 troops that May. The campaign against the island's indigenous villages succeeded within weeks, but disease took a much heavier toll on his force than combat did — records from the period put combat deaths at around a dozen against more than 500 deaths from malaria among his men. China formally protested the expedition, but a settlement brokered with British mediation saw it pay an indemnity and recognise Japan's actions, a result that also strengthened Japan's claim to the Ryukyu Kingdom. Saigō was awarded the First Class Order of Merit in 1876 in recognition of his role.

In 1873, his brother Saigō Takamori resigned from the government, over the rejection of his proposal to invade Korea during the Seikanron debate. Many other officials from the Satsuma region followed suit. However, Saigō Jūdō continued to remain loyal to the Meiji government. When the Satsuma Rebellion broke out in 1877, Saigō declined to join his brother's side; while Yamagata Aritomo led government forces against the rebels, Saigō took over Yamagata's duties as acting head of the army back in Tokyo. Upon the death of his brother in that rebellion, Saigō Jūdō became the primary political leader from Satsuma. In accord with the kazoku peerage system enacted in 1884, he received the title of count (hakushaku).

== Government official ==
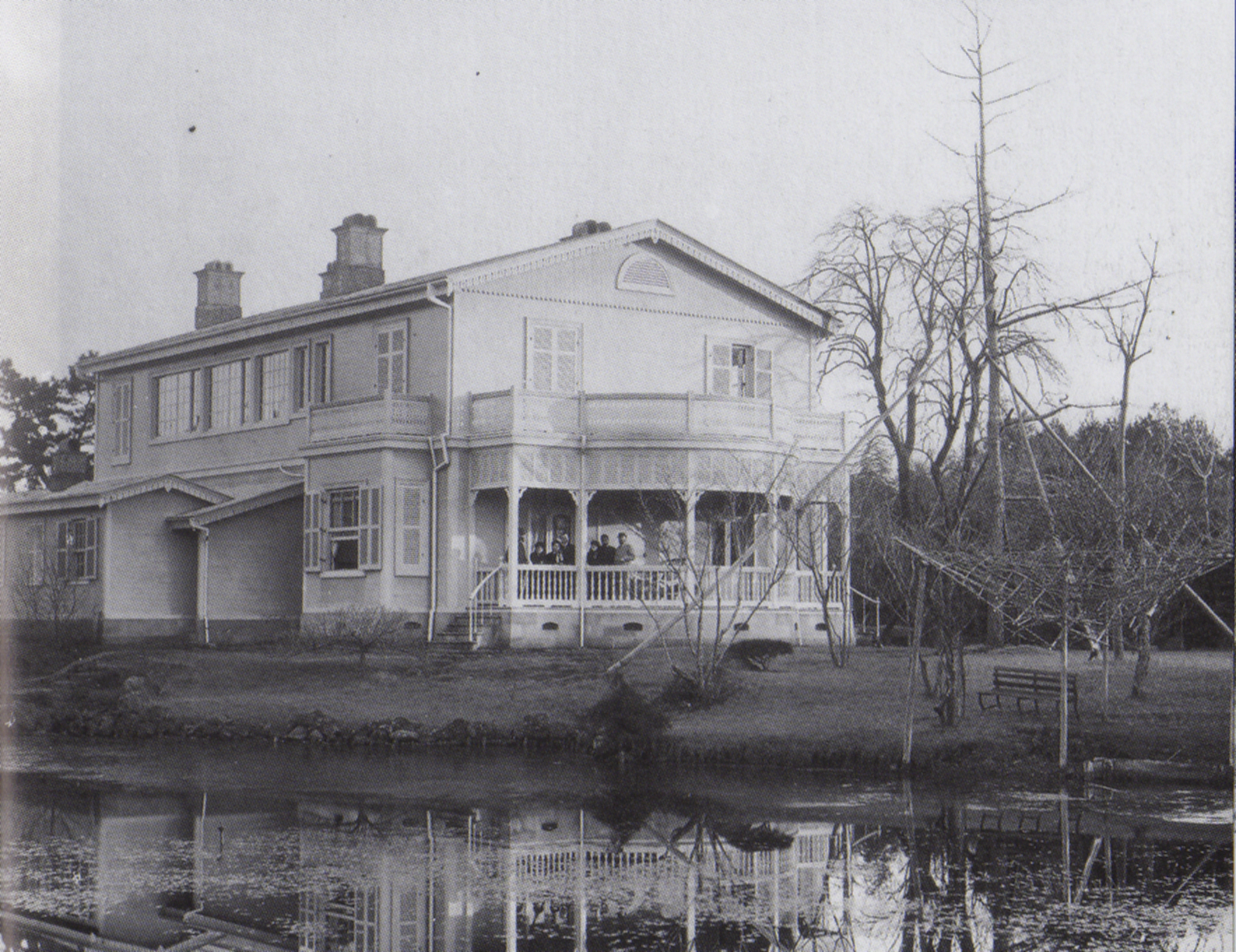
House of Saigō Jūdō, in Kamimeguro, Tokyo. Photograph by Hugues Krafft in 1882.

In May 1878, the day Ōkubo Toshimichi was assassinated in Tokyo, Saigō was reportedly among the first to reach the scene; he is said to have wrapped Ōkubo's body in a blanket himself and had it carried back to Ōkubo's residence in his own carriage.

Saigō held a string of important positions in the Itō Hirobumi cabinet, including Navy Minister (1885, 1892–1902). As Navy Minister he was credited with building up the young Imperial Japanese Navy largely by delegating to and promoting capable subordinates such as Kabayama Sukenori and Yamamoto Gonnohyōe, rather than directing naval policy in detail himself.

As Minister of Home Affairs, Saigō pushed strongly for the death penalty for Tsuda Sanzō, the accused in the Ōtsu incident of 1891, and threatened Kojima Korekata should the sentence be more lenient.

In 1892, he was appointed to the Privy Council as one of the genrō. In the same year, he founded a political party known as Kokumin Kyōkai (国民協会; The People's Co-operative Party).

In 1894, Saigō was given the rank of admiral, in recognition of his role as Navy minister, and his peerage title was elevated to that of marquis.

In 1898, the Imperial Japanese Navy bestowed upon him the honorary title of Marshal-Admiral. The rank is equivalent to Admiral of the Fleet or Grand Admiral. Over the course of his career he served as Navy Minister on four separate occasions, totalling roughly ten years in the post.

== Personal life ==
Saigō's former residence (once in Meguro, Tokyo) is registered as an Important Cultural Property by the Japanese government and is now at the Meiji-mura historical park outside of Inuyama, Aichi Prefecture. Saigō also owned a cottage in Yanagihara (present-day Numazu), Shizuoka Prefecture. Saigō Jūdō was the first person in Japan to own a race horse.

Gensui the Marquis Saigō died in 1902 and was buried in the Tama Cemetery in Fuchū in Tokyo.

== Honours ==
=== National honours ===
- Empire of Japan:
- Grand Cordon of the Order of the Chrysanthemum
- Grand Cordon with Paulownia Flowers of the Order of the Rising Sun
- Order of the Golden Kite, Second Class

== Ancestry ==
Ancestors of Saigō Jūdō

16. Saigō Kakuzaemon
8. Saigō Kichibee
4. Saigō Takamitsu
18. Machida Shizaemon
9. Machida NN
2. Saigō Kichibei
5. Yotsumoto NN
1. Saigō Jūdō
6. Shiihara Kuninori
3. Shiihara Masa

== Notes ==
Political offices
| Preceded by Kawamura Sumiyoshi as Lord of the Navy | Minister of the Navy; 22 December 1885 – 17 May 1890 | Succeeded by Kabayama Sukenori |
| Preceded by Yamagata Aritomo | Home Minister; May 1890 – June 1891 | Succeeded by Shinagawa Yajirō |
| Preceded by Nire Kagenori | Minister of the Navy; 11 March 1893 – 8 November 1898 | Succeeded by Yamamoto Gonnohyōe |
| Preceded by Itagaki Taisuke | Home Minister; November 1898 – October 1900 | Succeeded by Suematsu Kenchō |
