= Liberal Party (Japan, 1890) =

Liberal Party 自由党
- Leader: Itagaki Taisuke
- Founded: August 1890
- Dissolved: June 1898
- Succeeded by: Kenseitō
- Ideology: Liberalism; Minarchism

The Liberal Party (Japanese: 自由党, Jiyūtō) was a political party in Japan between 1890 and 1898.

== History ==
The party was established in August 1890 by 130 members of the House of Representatives who had been elected in July, and was initially named the Rikken Jiyūtō (立憲自由党, "Constitutional Liberal Party"). It was a merger of the Aikoku Kōtō, Daidō Club and Daidō Kyōwakai, together with several local parties. Initially led by Itagaki Taisuke, who had founded the original Liberal Party in 1881, it was renamed the "Liberal Party" in March 1891. It lost several Representatives in May 1891 when Ōi Kentarō's Kantō faction broke away to form the Eastern Liberal Party. Despite being the largest party, it was not involved in the government, and in 1891 joined forces with Rikken Kaishintō to oppose attempts to increase land taxation.

In the 1892 elections it was reduced to 94 seats, and lost a further 14 Representatives in December 1893 when a breakaway caused by the impeachment of party leader Hoshi Tōro for corruption led to the formation of the Dōshi Club. Although it won 120 seats in the March 1894 elections overall gaining 36 seats, the early elections were held in September that year, saw the party reduced to 107 seats. In April 1896 it joined Itō Hirobumi's government and Liberal leader Itagaki Taisuke was appointed Minister of Home Affairs.

After losing another two seats in the March 1898 elections, the party merged with Shimpotō in June 1898 to form the Kenseitō.

== Election results ==
Election	Leader	Seats	+/-	Status
1890	Itagaki Taisuke	130 / 300	new	Governing coalition
1892	Itagaki Taisuke	94 / 300	▼36	Governing coalition
March 1894	Itagaki Taisuke	120 / 300	▲26	Governing coalition
September 1894	Itagaki Taisuke	107 / 300	▼13	Opposition
March 1898	Itagaki Taisuke	105 / 300	▼2	Governing coalition
