= Dōshi Seisha =

Dōshi Seisha 同志政社
- Founded: December 1892
- Dissolved: May 1894
- Split from: Liberal Party
- Merged into: Rikken Kakushintō

Dōshi Seisha (Japanese: 同志政社, lit. 'Fellow Thinkers' Association') was a political party in Japan.

== History ==
The party was established in December 1892 by 14 MPs who had left the Liberal Party after its leader, Hoshi Tōru had been impeached for corruption. It was initially named the Dōshi Club (同志倶楽部), but was renamed Dōshi Seisha after becoming a political association.

It won 18 seats in the March 1894 elections. In May that year it merged with Dōmei Seisha to form Rikken Kakushintō.

== Election results ==
Election	Leader	Seats	Status
March 1894		24 / 300	Opposition
