= Shinagawa Yajirō =

Japanese samurai and politician (1843–1900)

Senior Second Rank Viscount Shinagawa Yajirō
- 品川 弥二郎
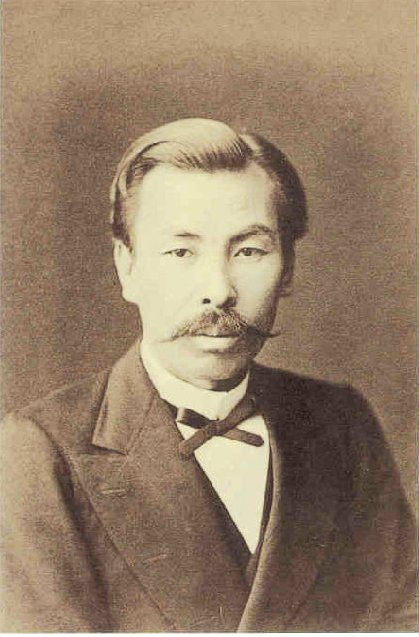

Minister of Home Affairs
- In office 1 June 1891 – 11 March 1892
- Prime Minister: Matsukata Masayoshi
- Preceded by: Saigō Jūdō
- Succeeded by: Soejima Taneomi

Personal details
- Born: 20 November 1843 Hagi, Chōshū, Japan
- Died: 26 February 1900 (aged 56) Tokyo, Japan
- Party: Kokumin Kyōkai

Military service
- Allegiance: Chōshū Domain
- Rank: Samurai
- Battles/wars: Kinmon incident; Boshin War

Viscount Shinagawa Yajirō (品川 弥二郎; 20 November 1843 – 26 February 1900) was a Japanese samurai of the Chōshū Domain and politician who became Home Minister in the early Meiji period.

== Biography ==
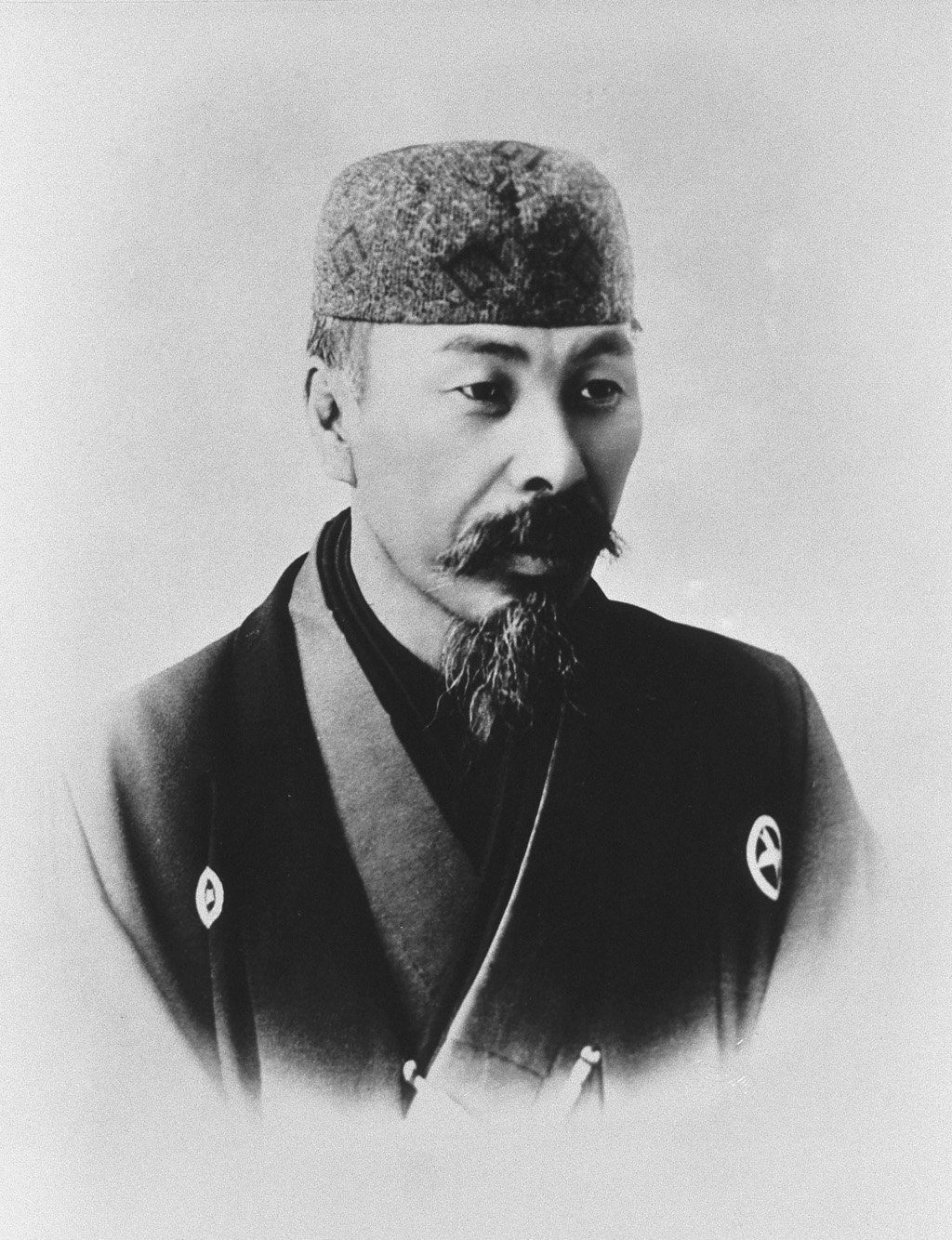

Shinagawa was born in Hagi, in the Chōshū Domain (present day Yamaguchi Prefecture). His father was an ashigaru, or lower ranking foot soldier in the service of the Mōri clan. During the Bakumatsu period, he attended Yoshida Shōin's Shoka Sonjuku Academy, and was a fervent supporter of the Sonnō jōi movement. In 1862, together with other pro-Sonnō jōi Chōshū samurai, he was a participant in an attack on the British legation in Edo. He was also present at the unsuccessful Hamaguri rebellion in Kyoto in August 1864. During the Boshin War of the Meiji Restoration, he served as a staff officer in the Imperial armies in various battles against the remnants of Tokugawa Shogunate forces in the Ōuetsu Reppan Dōmei in northern Honshū. He is also credited with writing the lyrics of "Miyasan, Miyasan" (宮さん宮さん), also known as "Tonyare-Bushi", a humorous loyalist song that was popular during the Boshin War.

After the establishment of the Meiji government, Shinagawa was sent to France for studies. Arriving in Paris in 1870, he was able to experience modern western military technologies and strategy during the Franco-Prussian War firsthand. After his return to Japan, he was appointed Chief Secretary of the Home Ministry, later rising to the post of Junior Vice Home Minister, followed by the position of Senior Vice Agriculture and Commerce Minister. He supported the development of agriculture and forestry through his efforts towards the formation of credit unions and agricultural cooperatives. He later briefly returned to Germany as a diplomat. In 1891, Shinagawa was appointed Home Minister in First Matsukata Cabinet.

During the tumultuous 1892 Japanese general election, Shinagawa responded to indirect criticism from Emperor Meiji of the failure of the Diet of Japan to reach an agreement on the national budget by accusing opposition political parties of sedition, and using his authority as Home Minister to take police action to suppress opposition political party activities during the election, and to intimidate candidates and voters. The resulting riots and other public disturbances around Japan led to numerous deaths and injuries, and the election itself was marred by balloting irregularities. Shinagawa came under much public criticism over the course of events, and was forced to resign from his post.

After his resignation, together with fellow former Home Minister Saigō Tsugumichi, Shinagawa founded the conservative Kokumin Kyōkai political party, serving as its vice-president.

Shinagawa was awarded the Order of the Rising Sun, 1st class, posthumously in 1900. A large bronze statue of Shinagawa is located to the left of the main entrance to Yasukuni Shrine in Tokyo.

== See also ==
- List of Japanese ministers, envoys and ambassadors to Germany

Political offices
| Preceded by Saigō Tsugumichi | Home Minister; June 1891 – March 1892 | Succeeded by Soejima Taneomi |
