= Dōmei Seisha =

Dōmei Seisha 同盟政社
- Founded: January 1894
- Dissolved: May 1894
- Preceded by: Dōmei Club
- Merged into: Rikken Kakushintō

Dōmei Seisha (Japanese: 同盟政社, lit. 'Union Association') was a political party in Japan.

== History ==
The party was established as the Dōmei Club (同盟倶楽部) in November 1892 by a group of 24 mostly independent MPs. It gradually became closer to the Rikken Kaishintō, and in January 1894 was renamed the Dōmei Seisha after becoming a political association.

The party won 24 seats in the March 1894 elections, and in May that year it merged with Dōshi Seisha to form Rikken Kakushintō.

== Election results ==
Election	Leader	Seats	Status
March 1894		18 / 300	Governing coalition
