= Kokumin Kyōkai =

Japanese political party

The Kokumin Kyōkai (Japanese: 国民協会, lit. National Association) was a political party in Japan.

== History ==
Led by Saigō Jūdō and Shinagawa Yajirō, nationalist supporters of Matsukata Masayoshi and his government established the Kokumin Kyōkai in June 1892. The party supported the expansion of the military and industrialisation and Meiji oligarchy. By early 1893 it had 68 members in the National Diet. It was less supportive of the Itō Hirobumi government installed in August 1892, and gradually became an opposition party.

The party won 35 seats in the National Diet during the March 1894 elections, but was reduced to 32 in the September 1894 elections. By 1897 defections saw it down to 23 representatives, and although it won 29 seats in the March 1898 elections, it only won 21 seats in the September 1898 elections. It was subsequently dissolved in 1899 and succeeded by the Teikokutō.

== Election results ==
Election	Leader	Seats	+/-	Status
March 1894	Shinagawa Yajirō	35 / 300	new	Opposition
September 1894	Shinagawa Yajirō	32 / 300	▼3	Opposition
March 1898	Shinagawa Yajirō	29 / 300	▼3	Opposition
August 1898	Shinagawa Yajirō	21 / 300	▼8	Opposition
