= Shimpotō =

Shimpotō 進歩党
- Leader: Ōkuma Shigenobu
- Founded: March 1, 1896
- Dissolved: June 20, 1898
- Merger of: Rikken Kaishintō; Rikken Kakushintō; Chūgoku Progressive Party; Teikoku Zaisei Kakushin-kai; Ōte Club
- Merged into: Kenseitō
- Headquarters: Tokyo
- Ideology: Japanese nationalism; Liberalism; Progressivism

Shimpotō (進歩党; Progressive Party) was a short-lived political party in Meiji period Japan.

== History ==
The Shimpotō was founded by Ōkuma Shigenobu in March 1896, as a merger of the Rikken Kaishintō and minor political parties to offset a temporary alliance between Ōkuma's rival, Itō Hirobumi and the Liberal Party of Japan (Jiyutō).

In June 1898, the Shimpotō merged with the Jiyutō to form the Kenseitō.

== Election results ==
Election	Leader	Seats	Status
March 1898	Ōkuma Shigenobu	105 / 300	Governing coalition
