= Rikken Kaishintō =

Rikken Kaishintō 立憲改進党
- Leader: Ōkuma Shigenobu
- Founded: April 16, 1882
- Dissolved: March 1, 1896
- Merged into: Shimpotō
- Headquarters: Tokyo
- Ideology: Gradualism; Reformism; British-style Constitutional monarchy Pro-Local autonomy Pro-Tax cuts Anti-Monopoly

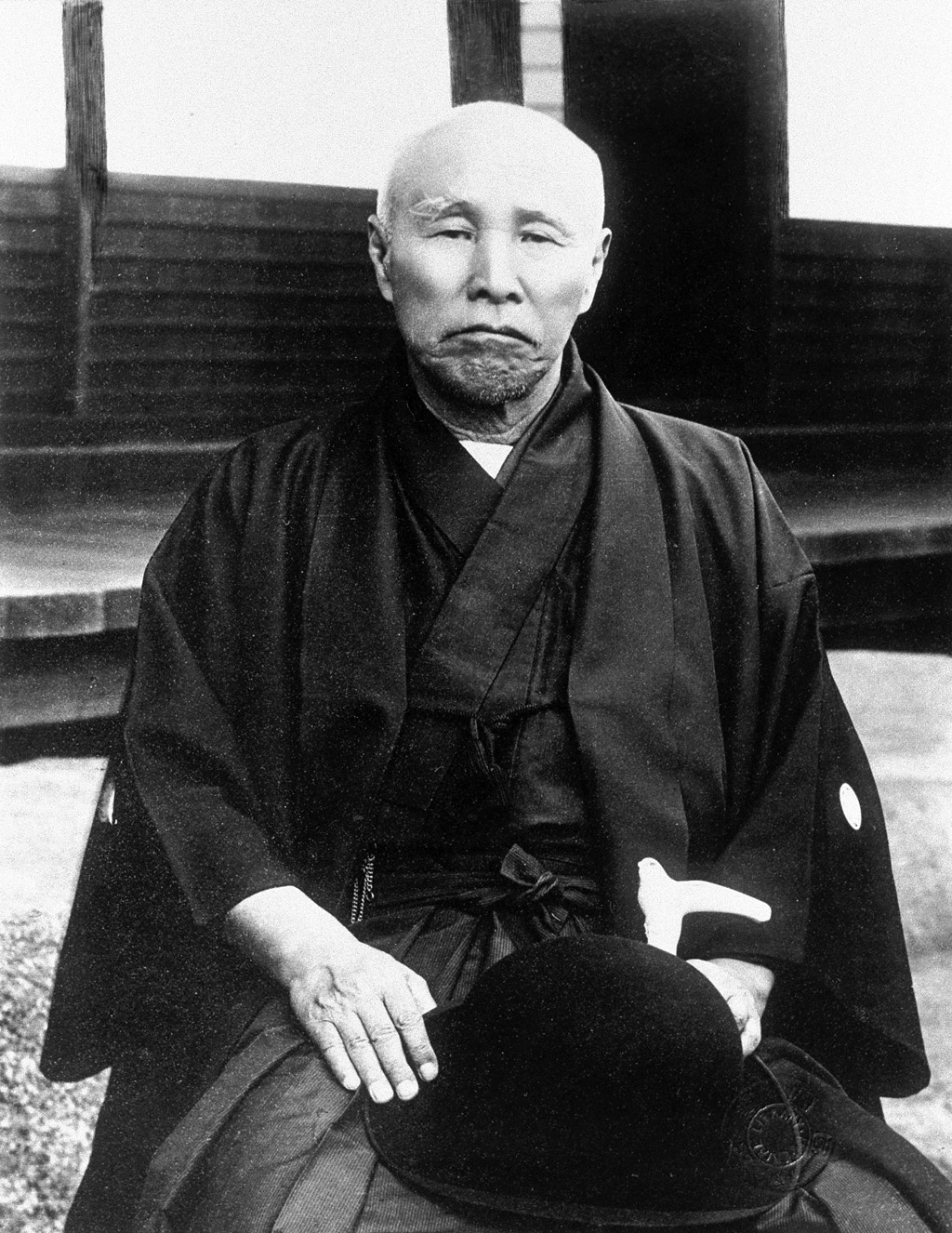
Ōkuma Shigenobu, founder of the Rikken Kaishintō

The Rikken Kaishintō (立憲改進党; Constitutional Reform Party) was a political party in the Empire of Japan. It was also known as simply the Kaishintō.

The Kaishintō was founded by Ōkuma Shigenobu on 16 April 1882, with the assistance of Yano Ryūsuke, Inukai Tsuyoshi and Ozaki Yukio. It received financial backing by the Mitsubishi zaibatsu, and had strong support from the Japanese press, and urban intellectuals.

The Kaishintō pursued a moderate approach, calling for a British-style constitutional monarchy within the framework of a parliamentary democracy. In a speech Ōkuma gave at the inauguration of the party, he emphasized the symbolic role of the monarch in the type of government he envisioned. He also argued that those extremists who supported having the emperor directly involved in political decision-making were in fact endangering the very existence of the Imperial institution.

In the first General Election of 1890, the Kaishintō won 46 seats to the Lower House of the Diet of Japan thus becoming the second largest party after the Liberal Party (Jiyūtō).

Afterwards, the Kaishintō adopted an increasingly nationalistic foreign policy, and in March 1896 merged with several smaller nationalist parties to form the Shimpotō.

== Election results ==
Election	Leader	Seats	+/-	Status
1890	Ōkuma Shigenobu	41 / 300	new	Governing coalition
1892	Ōkuma Shigenobu	38 / 300	▼3	Governing coalition
March 1894	Ōkuma Shigenobu	60 / 300	▲22	Governing coalition
September 1894	Ōkuma Shigenobu	49 / 300	▼11	Opposition
