= Hisamoto =

Hisamoto (written: 久本) is a Japanese surname. Notable people with the surname include:

- Masami Hisamoto (久本 雅美; born 1958), Japanese comedian, actress and singer
- Yuichi Hisamoto (久本 祐一; born 1979), Japanese baseball player
- Ricardo Hisamoto (久本リカルド ; born 1967), Japanese-Brazilian Biologist

Hisamoto (written: 久元 or 尚基) is also a masculine Japanese given name. Notable people with the name include:

- Hijikata Hisamoto (土方 久元; 1833–1918), Japanese politician
- Nijō Hisamoto (二条 尚基; 1471–1497), Japanese kugyō
