= Wasson (surname) =

Wasson is a surname. Notable people with the surname include:

- Craig Wasson (born 1954), American actor
- Daniel Wasson
- Dave Wasson, American television producer, director and screenwriter
- David Atwood Wasson (1823–1887), American minister and Transcendentalist author
- Dean Wasson
- Erin Wasson
- Ernie Wasson
- Gus Wasson, American NASCAR driver
- Isabel Bassett Wasson, American geologist and naturalist
- James C. Wasson (1886–1966), American politician and member of the Mississippi House of Representatives
- James R. Wasson (1847–1923), U.S. Army officer in Japan
- Jeremiah Richard Wasson (1855–1913), American military instructor in 19th century Japan
- Robert Gordon Wasson (1898–1986), American banker who became an expert on psilocybe mushrooms
- Thomas C. Wasson, American Consul General in Jerusalem, 1948
- William Wasson, American priest

== See also ==
- Wasson, Ojibwe leader
- Roy J. Wasson High School
