= Corruption in Japan =

The Japanese government has taken steps to address corruption in Japan through reforms and statutes, but it remains a serious concern for the country. Japan has seen significant corruption scandals throughout its history. Cases of corruption have been classified into three classes: bad-apple corruption, standard-operating-procedure corruption, and systemic corruption. Corrupt practices include bribery, political donations, and those involving the amakudari, among others. There were also high-profile incidents of corporate malfeasance.

Transparency International's Corruption Perceptions Index for 2025 ranked Japan in the 18th position with a score of 71. The Corruption Perceptions Index scores the public sector of 182 countries on a scale from 0 ("highly corrupt") to 100 ("very clean"). The country with the highest score is ranked first. For comparison with regional scores, the best score among those countries of the Asia Pacific region that appeared in the Index (Note: Afghanistan, Australia, Bangladesh, Bhutan, Brunei Darussalam, Cambodia, China, Fiji, Hong Kong, India, Indonesia, Japan, North Korea, South Korea, Laos, Malaysia, Maldives, Mongolia, Myanmar, Nepal, New Zealand, Pakistan, Papua New Guinea, Philippines, Singapore, Solomon Islands, Sri Lanka, Taiwan, Thailand, Timor-Leste, Vanuatu, Vietnam) was 84, the average score was 45 and the worst score was 15. For comparison with worldwide scores, the best score was 89 (ranked 1), the average score was 42, and the worst score was 9 (ranked 181, in a two-way tie).

== History ==
There were documented corruption cases during the Meiji Restoration period in the late 19th and 20th centuries. Japan, in this period, had been undergoing rapid industrialization. This entailed the emergence of Japanese conglomerates called zaibatsu, or the Japanese cliques. The growth of these companies was encouraged by the government in a bid to drive economic development. Close relationships between zaibatsu leaders and government officials became the norm and this resulted in a culture of corruption. This led to the heavy influence of the zaibatsu's interests on policy decisions and regulatory frameworks.

The first major corruption scandal in Japan was the Nitto case, which transpired in 1909. Representatives of the Nitto company bribed politicians in order to influence legislation covering the sugar industry. This resulted in the successful passage of laws involving a tax on sugar products. The company then wanted to establish a national sugar company. When this failed, Nitto fielded its own candidates during the parliamentary election. After its bribery and corrupt practices were revealed, Nitto's executives and members of the parliament were investigated and prosecuted. Prosecutors took the lead in the investigation instead of the police, also a first in Japan.

One of the most notable corruption cases during the 1920s was the Mitsui zaibatsu scandal. It was widely known that this conglomerate offered financial assistance to party politicians as well as government regulators in exchange for favorable treatment. Accounts indicate that Mitsui's bribery practices extended well into the 1930s. This is demonstrated in the case of Ariga Nagabumi, Mitsui's managing director. He was recorded to have contributed to the representatives of the Cherry Blossom Society and had continued to make bribery payments to politicians such as Kita Ikki. Ikeda Seihin, his successor, would continue this practice, bribing not only political figures but also army officers.

One of the biggest corruption scandals in modern Japan involved Lockheed Martin in 1976. Previously, in a move to secure overseas aircraft contracts, the American company had set aside $25 million for bribery. During a Senate investigation in the U.S., it was revealed that several Japanese officials, including Yoshio Kodama, received payoffs. It was reported that Yoshio was given $7 million to curry favor and secure favorable deals, which included the All Nippon Airways' purchase of the Lockheed L-1011 TriStar jets.

=== Amakudari ===
Amakudari is a Japanese patronage system that emerged during World War II when the government started to regulate the economy to support its war efforts. Companies started employing bureaucrats to anticipate future government policies and also to lobby for their business interests. This practice involves former high-level bureaucrats migrating to high-profile positions in both private and public sectors. There are cases when companies would promise positions to public officials in exchange for favors. The system has been associated with corruption since these individuals – through their government position, influence, and networks – can facilitate bid-rigging, inspection avoidance, and the circumvention of traditional expectations of transparency and fair play.

Amakudari persists today. A report by the Japan Times in 2011, for example, cited that 68 former government officials have found senior employment positions in the country's 12 electricity suppliers via amakudari in the past 50 years.

The following are some examples of corruption cases involving amakudari:

- Recruit Scandal (1988/1989): In 1988, the Japanese zaibatsu Recruit Co., was revealed to have bribed public officials with Recruit stocks. In addition, it received favorable treatment from public officials with the promise of secured post-retirement positions within the company. By the fall of 1988, several high-profile politicians were implicated including various government ministers such as the Minister of Justice Takashi Hasegawa, Finance Minister Kiichi Miyazawa, and the Economic Planning Agency director, Ken Harada, among other officials including members of the former prime minister's cabinet.
- Nomura Securities (1990s): Officials of the Ministry of Finance were discovered to have amakudari links during the 1990s. This association was traced to financial institutions and the most notable was Nomura Securities, one of Japan's largest brokerage firms. Suspicion of corruption emerged as said officials facilitated preferential treatment and regulatory leniency.
- Japan Highway Public Corporation (2000s): The Japan Highway Public Corporation (JHPC), a public company established to construct and manage Japan's highway networks, was embroiled in a corruption scandal related to amakudari. It was revealed that the company awarded questionable contracts to twenty-three colluding bridge builders. This was considered the biggest scandal of its time in the country.

=== Contemporary Cases ===
Corruption in Japan is not only confined to cases implicating government officials. There were also instances of corporate malfeasance such as the Olympus Corporation's accounting fraud in 2011, which was perpetrated to hide losses amounting to $1.7 billion. The misconduct, which was perpetrated by top executives, was revealed by the company's CEO Michael Woodford. The company also admitted that it hid losses for over two decades.

In 2023, four ministers of Prime Minister Fumio Kishida's cabinet resigned after a scandal erupted involving the Liberal Democratic Party (LDP). Several LDP politicians, particularly those who belong to the so-called Abe faction (named after former prime minister Shinzo Abe), were accused of pocketing excess funds received at fundraisers and funneling the money into slush funds. Investigators raided its office and of one other faction, the Nikkai group. Authorities also investigated four other factions within LDP including the incumbent Prime Minister's faction.

== Anti-corruption measures and reforms ==
In response to corruption challenges, Japan has instituted anti-corruption measures that include legal reforms, corporate responsibility, and collaborative initiatives. The current system features an approach that focuses on prevention and transparency.

Before World War II, anti-corruption measures were led by prosecutors, who enjoyed strong public support. To ensure their independence, the power to appoint the Prosecutor General was transferred from the Cabinet to the Emperor. By 1947, a special division was established to investigate misappropriation cases within the Tokyo District Prosecutors' Office. This later became the Special Investigation Department, which became in charge of economic crimes, tax evasion, and corruption cases.

The modern legal framework that addresses corruption in Japan is composed of the Unfair Competition Prevention Act (UCPA) and Japan's Penal Code. The former outlines the prohibition covering corruption and bribery while the latter provides the penalty for violations committed by public officials. Japan also established mechanisms for transparency and whistleblower protection.

The emphasis on prevention and transparency can be demonstrated in the anti-corruption approach of Japan's Official Development Assistance (ODA) agency. It has a Consultation Desk on Anti-Corruption, which addresses fraud and corruption involving Japan's ODA initiatives. Violators of the ODA's measures face exclusion from ODA's projects.

Japan had also amended and strengthened its anti-bid-rigging laws after the scandals during the 2000s. Reports showed that, by 2009, these reforms were effective and had led to a substantial decline in noncompetitive bidding.

== See also ==
- Tohokushinsha Film and Ministry of Internal Affairs and Communications scandal
- Lockheed bribery scandals
- Asia Crime Prevention Foundation
