= James Wasson =

James Wasson may refer to:

- James R. Wasson, U.S. Army officer who worked in Japan
- James C. Wasson, member of the Mississippi House of Representatives
