= Douglas R. Cassel =

American naval officer

- Born: October 1845; Zanesville, Ohio, U.S.
- Died: June 15, 1875 (aged 29); Philadelphia, Pennsylvania, U.S.
- Burial place: Woodlawn Cemetery, Zanesville, Ohio, U.S.
- Military career
- Allegiance: United States; Empire of Japan
- Branch: United States Navy
- Lieutenant commander (USA); Captain (Japan)
- Commands: USS Ashuelot
- Conflicts: American Civil War; Battle of Mobile Bay (WIA); Second Battle of Fort Fisher; Korean Expedition; Battle of Ganghwa; Taiwan Expedition of 1874 (DOW)

Lieutenant Commander Douglas R. Cassel was a United States Naval Officer and veteran of the American Civil War known for his service to Meiji Japan's armed forces.

== Early life and career ==
Douglas Cassel was born in October 1845 Zanesville, Ohio, the fourth child of James W. and Amanda A. Cassel.

After his father died in 1850, Douglas decided to join the United States Navy as his maternal grandfather had done. He received an appointment for the United States Naval Academy from Congressman Cydnor B. Tompkins, and entered the academy as a midshipman in September 1860. At 15 years old he was quartered on the USS Constitution

He received demerits virtually every month during his first few years, including 6 for being "disorderly" during fencing on April 23, 1861, and 10 from Alfred Thayer Mahan for "visiting and skylarking after taps" on January 27, 1863.

Given the Union's need for more officers, Cassel was promoted to acting ensign in September 1863, and ordered to report to the USS Powhatan, where he served until January 1864, when he transferred to the USS Rhode Island at Cap-Haïtien, Haiti. Three months later he transferred again to the USS Brooklyn, participating in the Battle of Mobile Bay while aboard, receiving a slight scalp wound in the process.

In January 1865 Cassel commanded a landing party from the Brooklyn at the Second Battle of Fort Fisher, participating in the North Eastern attack on the fort which was ultimately repulsed. Attacking on the left of the line, Cassel lost three men missing and one wounded.

Three months after the battle Cassel was transferred to the USS Dacotah, where he was promoted to lieutenant in July 1866, and lieutenant commander in May 1868.

In August 1870 Cassel was ordered to report for duty to Rear Admiral John Rodgers in the Asiatic Squadron, reporting in May 1871 to the USS Alaska. A month later he participated in the United States punitive expedition against Korea, where he commanded the Alaska's two howitzer batteries, seven guns total, which were dragged across a mud flat to support the main column during the Battle of Ganghwa.

== Japanese service ==
Four months later, Cassel transferred to the USS Ashuelot, temporarily acting as her commander from December 1873 to March 1874, before being contacted by the Japanese government to assist in modernizing its navy. Cassel successfully requested a 1-year leave of absence to serve in the employ of the Japanese government, which was endorsed by United States Minister to Japan John Bingham, where he was to earn $7,000 and the rank of captain.

Soon after in April Cassel was employed alongside James R. Wasson to serve on a punitive expedition against the Botan aborigines of Taiwan. Cassel and Wasson set off on the ship Nepaul with the expedition's advance party of 100 men, under Cassel's command. They landed on Taiwan May 6, 1874, selecting a beachhead campsite. On May 15, Cassel lead negotiations with Chief Issa, head of the island's 16 tribes, where Issa gave the Japanese permission to punish the offending Botan tribe. A celebratory feast was had, where a Winchester rifle, brought along by either Cassel or Wasson, was used to impress the friendly natives with its capacity.

During the expedition Cassel voiced many frustrations with Japanese disobedience and lack of restraint, particularly among the shizoku who understood warfare primarily in the samurai ethos of taking risks to attain honor. In letters to Charles Le Gendre, Cassel referred to General Tani Tateki as a "little imbecile", and also argued with Admiral Noriyoshi Akamatsu for his plans to attack friendly tribes as punishment for an incident where shots were fired at survey boats of the Nisshin, as well as his alleged lack of control over his men.

Cassel was particularly incensed by the Battle of Stone Gate, as he had previously ordered the Japanese forces involved to return, but they instead advanced into the pass which ultimately provoked the battle. Cassel had constructed a plan to march a force through the night to the flanks of Stone Gate and for a smaller force to engage in a diversion there shortly before the main force's arrival, ensnaring the Botan in the process. Ironically, the Japanese did end up flanking the Botan while using their main force at the battle as a distraction as an extemporaneous tactic, resulting in a similar outcome to what Cassel had planned.

In July there was an outbreak of malaria which killed roughly 550 Japanese troops, infecting both Cassel and Wasson. Wasson left the Island relatively early, while Cassel remained until October, when his leave of absence was rescinded by Secretary of the Navy George M. Robeson due to protest from Minister Bingham, a staunch peace advocate who had been unaware of either the Japanese or Cassel's plans to involve him and Wasson in the expedition. Cassel, however, requested to be detached from duty and permitted to return home due to his illness, which was granted.

In May 1875 Cassel returned to Zanesville, his health ruined. While visiting relatives in a Philadelphia suburb, he succumbed to the lingering effects of malaria and died on June 15. His body was returned to Zanesville and buried in Woodlawn Cemetery.

Cassel's mother Amanda was reliant on him financially, and Captain Edward Y. McCauley along with officers of his ship the USS Lackawanna contacted Minister Bingham to convince him to persuade the Japanese government to pay Cassel's mother a four month's salary for his service, roughly $4,000, in accordance with the employment contract. There is no record of whether McCauley's attempts were successful, but the US government paid Amanda a monthly pension of $30 until she died in 1892.

== See also ==
- Henry Walton Grinnell
- William McEntyre Dye
