= Walsh brothers =

Walsh brothers may refer to:

- Walsh brothers (merchants), four 19th-century American merchants
- Walsh brothers (aviation), 20th-century aviator duo from New Zealand
- The Walsh Brothers, 21st-century American comedy duo
