= Japanese ship Nisshin =

At least three warships of Japan have borne the name Nisshin:

- Japanese warship Nisshin a screw sloop launched in 1868 and scrapped in 1893
- Japanese cruiser Nisshin a Kasuga-class cruiser launched in 1903 and expended as a target in 1936
- Japanese seaplane carrier Nisshin a seaplane tender launched in 1939 and sunk in 1943
