= 1874 Japanese expedition to Taiwan =

Punitive expedition conducted by Japan

Taiwan Expedition
- Part of the Formosa Conflict
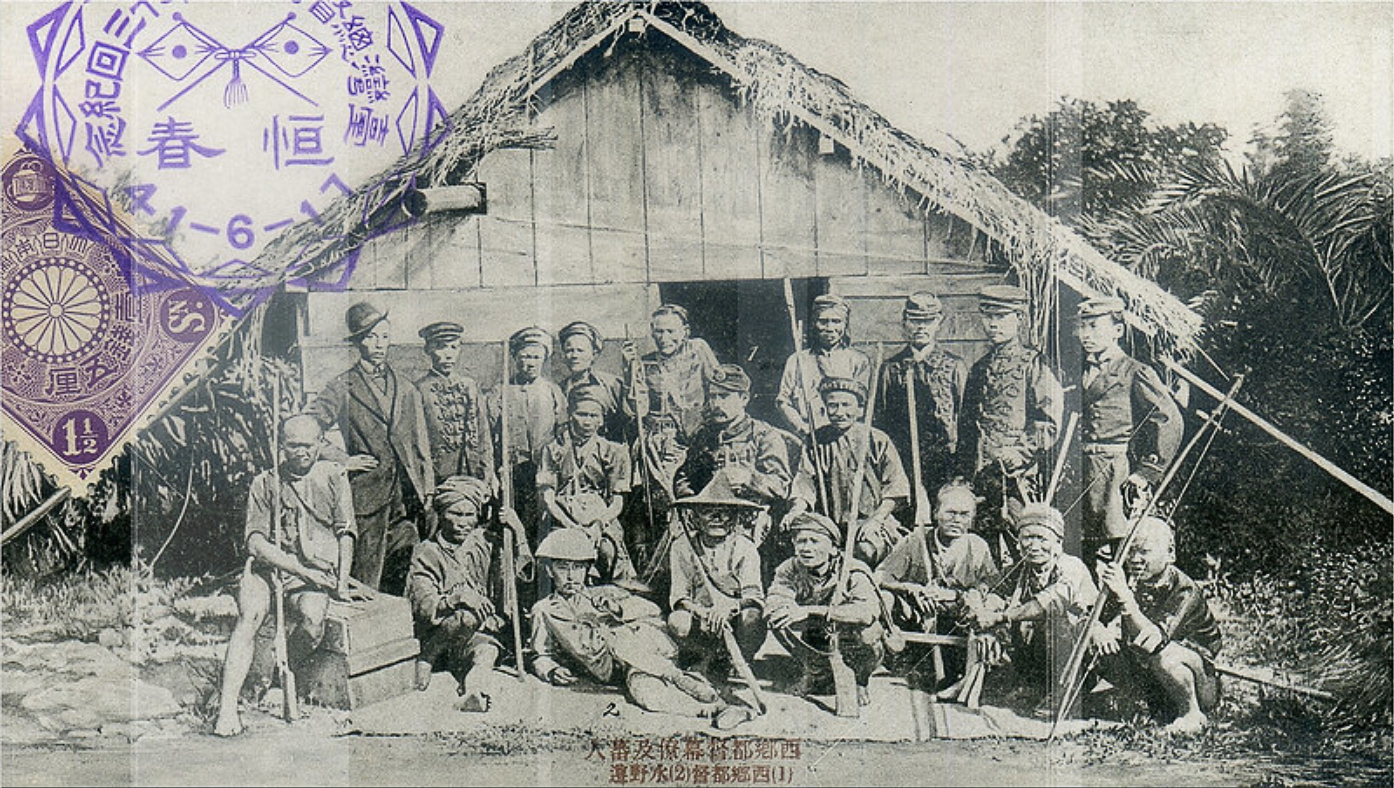
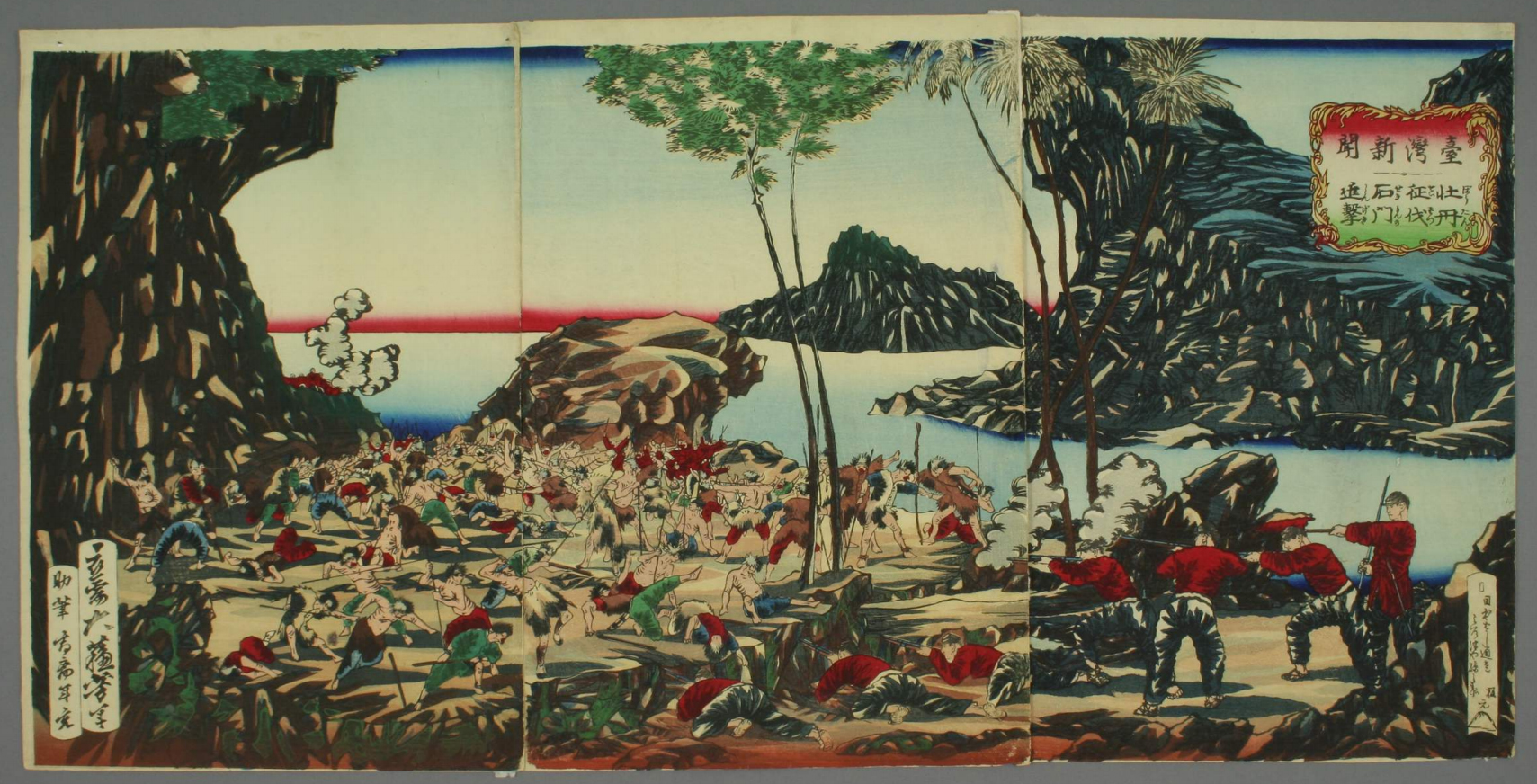
- Commander-in-chief Saigo (sitting at the center) pictured with leaders of the Seqalu tribe. The Assault at Sekimon (石門進撃), May 22, 1874.
Date	6 May – 3 December 1874
Location	Taiwan Prefecture, Fujian Province, Qing China
Result	Japanese victory
Territorial changes	Japanese occupation of southern Taiwan; Qing renunciation of suzerainty over the Ryukyu Islands

Belligerents
Japan	Botan

Commanders and leaders
(Empire of Japan) Saigō Tsugumichi (Empire of Japan) Sakuma Samata (Empire of Japan) Douglas Cassel (Empire of Japan) Noriyoshi Akamatsu	Unknown (DOW)

Strength
Land: 3,600; Sea: 6 warships	Unknown

Casualties and losses
12 killed ~30 wounded 561 died from disease	89 killed Many wounded
- 561 Japanese troops and Douglas Cassel died of disease during the expedition and occupation.

The Japanese expedition to Taiwan, referred to in Japan as the Taiwan Expedition (Japanese: 台湾出兵, Hepburn: Taiwan Shuppei) and in Taiwan and mainland China as the Mudan Incident (Chinese: 牡丹社事件), was a punitive expedition launched by the Japanese ostensibly in retaliation for the murder of 54 Ryukyuan sailors by Paiwan indigenous peoples near the southwestern tip of Taiwan in December 1871. In May 1874, the Imperial Japanese Army and Imperial Japanese Navy attacked the indigenous Taiwanese peoples in southern Taiwan and retreated in December after the Qing dynasty agreed to pay an indemnity of 500,000 taels, with Japan conceding that China had sovereignty over Taiwan. Some ambiguous wording in the agreed terms were later argued by Japan to be confirmation of Chinese renunciation of suzerainty over the Ryukyu Islands, paving the way for de facto Japanese incorporation of the Ryukyu in 1879.

== Background ==
=== Mudan incident ===
In December 1871, a Ryukyuan vessel shipwrecked on the southeastern tip of Taiwan and 54 sailors were killed by indigenous Taiwanese peoples. Four tribute ships were returning to the Ryukyu Islands when they were blown off course on 12 December. Two ships were pushed towards Taiwan. One of them landed on Taiwan's western coast and made it back home with the help of Qing officials. The other one crashed into the eastern coast of southern Taiwan near Padiyudr Bay (Chinese: 八瑤灣; pinyin: Bāyáowān). There were 69 passengers and 66 managed to make it to shore. Fifty-four of them were killed by Paiwan while the remaining 12 were rescued by Han Chinese who transferred them to Taiwan Prefecture (modern Tainan). They then made their way to Fujian province in mainland China and from there, the Qing government arranged transport to send them home. They departed in July 1872.

This event, known as the Mudan incident, did not immediately cause any concern in Japan. A few officials knew of it by mid-1872 but it was not until April 1874 that it became an international concern. The repatriation procedure in 1872 was by the book and had been a regular affair for several centuries. From the 17th to 19th centuries, the Qing had settled 401 Ryukyuan shipwreck incidents both on the coast of mainland China and Taiwan. The Ryukyu Kingdom did not ask Japanese officials for help regarding the shipwreck. Instead its king, Shō Tai, sent a reward to Chinese officials in Fuzhou for the return of the 12 survivors.

=== Diplomacy ===
On 30 August 1872, Sukenori Kabayama, a general of the Imperial Japanese Army, urged the Japanese government to invade Taiwan's tribal areas. In September, Japan dethroned the king of Ryukyu. On 9 October, Kabayama was ordered to conduct a survey in Taiwan. In 1873, Tanemomi Soejima was sent to communicate to the Qing court that if it did not extend its rule to the entirety of Taiwan, punish murderers, pay victims' families compensation, and agree to talk about the matter, Japan would take care of it. The Foreign Minister Sakimitsu Yanagihara believed that the perpetrators of the Mudan incident were "all Taiwan savages beyond Chinese education and law." Japan justified sending an expedition to Taiwan through linguistic interpretation of huawai zhimin (lit. outside the sphere of civilization) to mean not part of China. Chinese diplomat Li Hongzhang rejected the claim that the murder of Ryukyuans had anything to do with Japan once he learned of Japan's aspirations. However, after communications between the Qing and Yanagihara, the Japanese took their explanation to mean that the Qing government had not opposed Japan's claims to sovereignty over the Ryukyu Islands, disclaimed any jurisdiction over indigenous Taiwanese peoples, and had indeed consented to Japan's expedition to Taiwan. In the eyes of Japan and the foreign advisor Charles Le Gendre, the indigenous people were "savages" who had no sovereign or international status, and therefore their territory was "terra nullius", free to be seized for Japan. The Qing argued that like in many other countries, the administration of the government did not stretch to every part of a country, similar to the Native American territories in the United States or aboriginal territories in Australia and New Zealand, a view Le Gendre also took before his employment by the Japanese.

Japan had already sent a student, Kurooka Yunojo, to conduct surveys in Taiwan in April 1873. Kabayama reached Tamsui on 23 August disguised as a merchant and surveyed eastern Taiwan. On 9 March 1874, the Taiwan Expedition prepared for its mission. The magistrate of the Taiwan Circuit learned of the impending Japanese invasion from a Hong Kong newspaper quoting a Japanese news item and reported it to Fujian authorities. Qing officials were taken by complete surprise due to the seemingly cordial relations with Japan at the time. On 17 May, Saigō Jūdō led the main force, 3,600 strong, aboard four warships in Nagasaki headed to Tainan. On 6 June, the Japanese emperor issued a certificate condemning the Taiwan "savages" for killing our "nationals", the Ryukyuans killed in southeastern Taiwan.

== Expedition ==
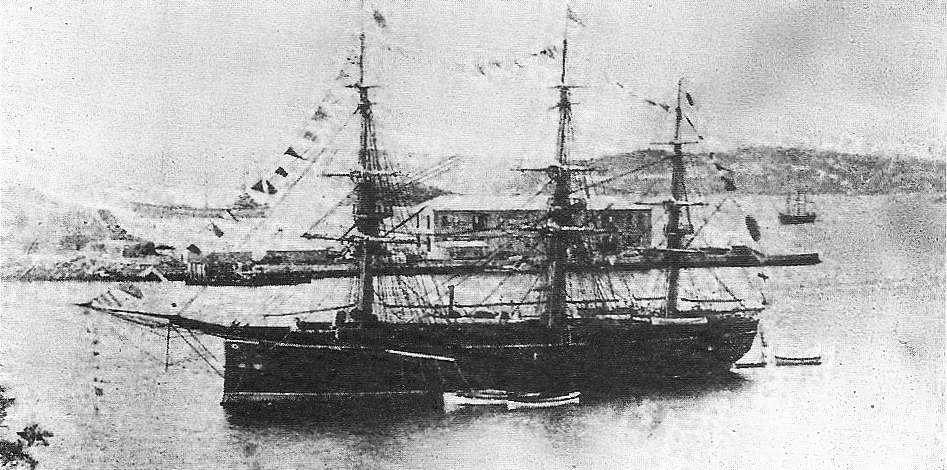
The Ryūjō was the flagship of the Taiwan expedition.

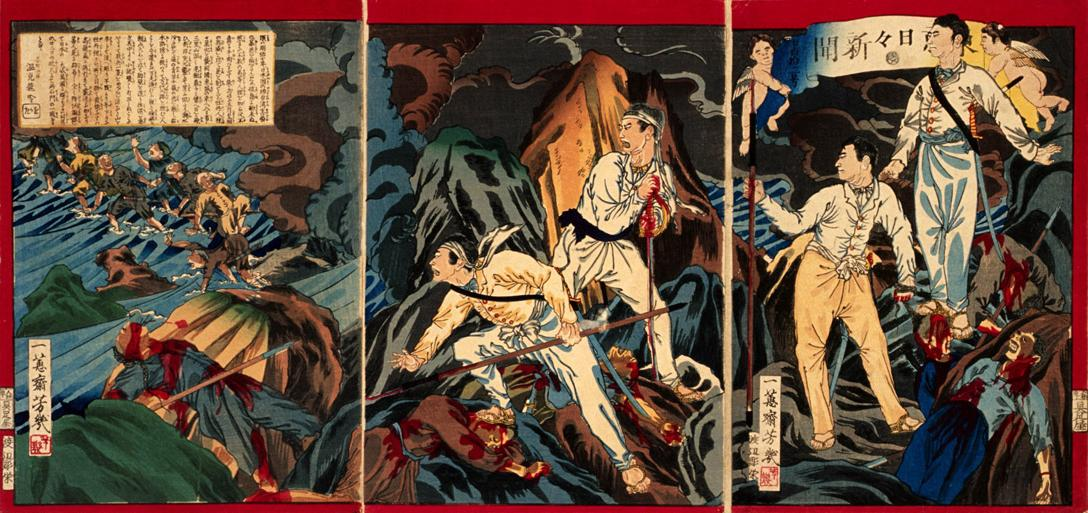
The battle of Stone Gate, against the "Botan" indigenous people, was the most serious encounter of the expedition.

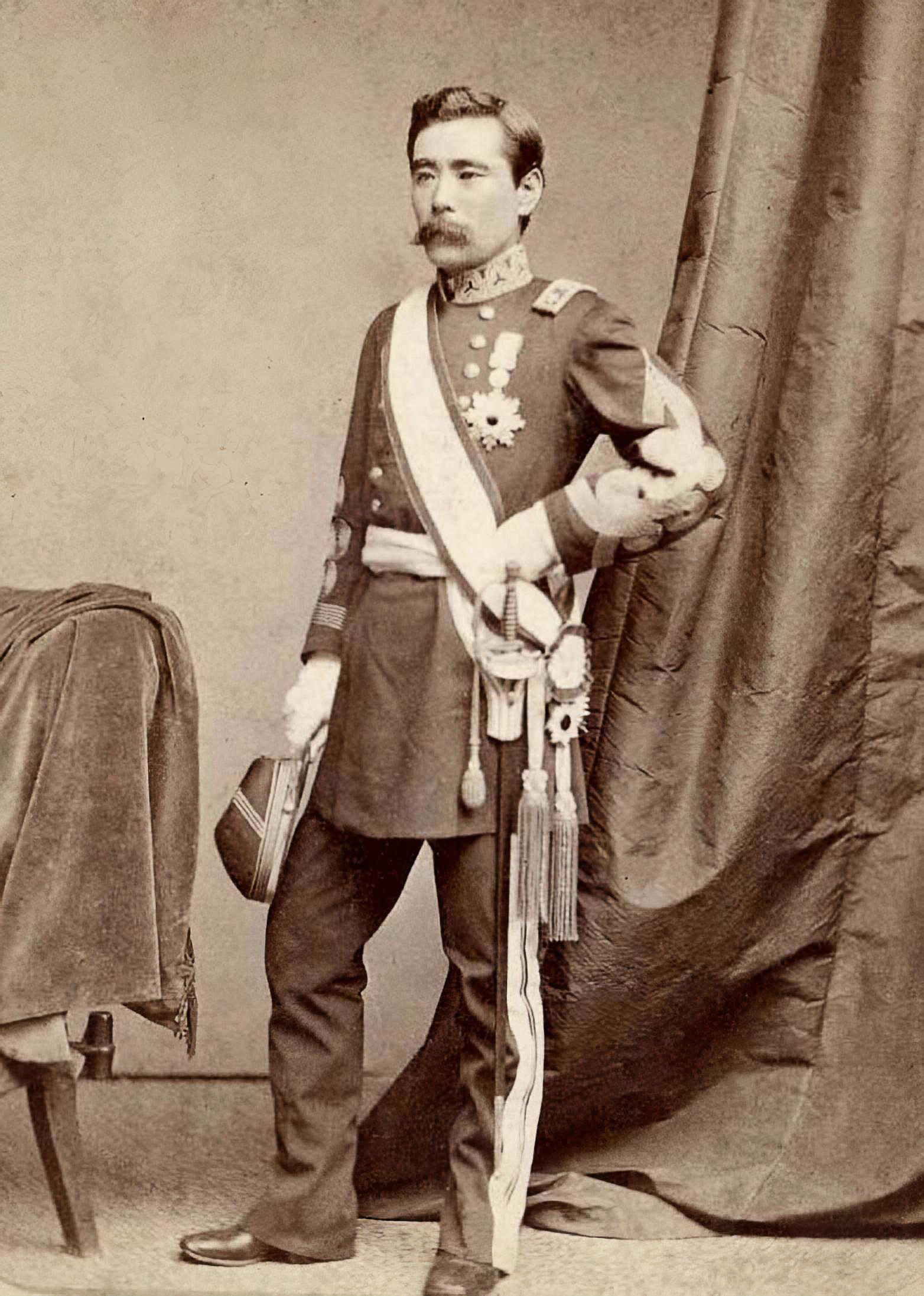
Marquis Saigo Tsugumichi commanded Japanese expeditionary forces as a lieutenant-general in the Taiwan Expedition.

On 3 May 1874, Kusei Fukushima delivered a note to Fujian-Zhejiang Governor Li Henian announcing that they were heading to savage territory to punish the culprits.

On 6 May the Japanese landed a small force of 100 men, commanded by American Captain Douglas R. Cassel, to select a campsite fortified by the sea. On 7 May, a Chinese translator, Zhan Hansheng, was sent ashore to establish peaceful relations with tribes other than the Mudan and Kuskus.

American foreign officers and Fukushima landed at Checheng and Xinjie. They tried to use Baxian Bay at Qinggangpu as their barracks but heavy rain flooded the site a few days later so the Japanese moved to the southern end of Langqiao Bay on 11 May. They learned that Tanketok (also known as Tok-a-Tok) had died and invited the Shemali tribe for talks. Japanese scouts fanned out and were met by attacks by the indigenous Taiwanese. The Qing officially responded for the first time on the same day that the Japanese reached Langqiao Bay, claiming that the Japanese had violated the Sino-Japanese Friendship and Trade Treaty, signed in 1871. On 15 May, Cassel acted as a negotiator to Chief Issa (Chinese: 伊厝), head of the island's sixteen southern tribes. Chief Issa stated the "Botans" were out of his control, and gave the Japanese his consent to punish them as they wished.

On 17 May, a 100-man party went inland to scout for another camp location, and from this party a dozen split off to investigate a village. Despite being within friendly territory, this small group was ambushed by the Botans. In the ensuing skirmish one Japanese soldier was wounded in the neck and a sergeant from Satsuma killed. The small Japanese group retreated back to the main force, and upon returning found the sergeant had been decapitated by the indigenous Taiwanese, his head taken as a trophy.

On 18 May the Japanese ship Nisshin commanded by Akamatsu Noriyoshi anchored in Kwaliang bay and launched a small boat to conduct surveys. Indigenous Taiwanese from the village Koalut fired upon the boat with muskets. Despite receiving no injuries, Akamatsu was enraged at the incident and made immediate plans not only for attack on Koalut, but the nearby village of Lingluan as well. These plans would be postponed and eventually cancelled.

On 21 May, a detachment of 12 men was sent out to investigate the area where the Satsuma sergeant had been killed. During this investigation the detachment was ambushed again by a group of 50 natives and in the exchange of fire two Japanese were seriously wounded and one attacker was killed. The Japanese returned hastily to the shore and sounded the alarm, and 250 men accompanied by Wasson marched inland to respond. Wasson was dismayed at the lack of discipline of the Japanese soldiers, particularly in the rear, who quickly broke rank and dashed ahead in a race to get to combat first. The natives retreated after the arrival of the main force.

Saigō arrived with more troops on 22 May. Colonel Sakuma Samata commanding a 150-strong force marched too far inland and was ambushed by 70 Mudan fighters, commencing the Battle of Stone Gate. The indigenous Taiwanese people were already in pre-selected ambush positions behind stone, while the Japanese had to make do with what cover they could find from rocks seated in the waist-deep river and only being able to employ 30 troops at one time due to the terrain. Early in the engagement Sakuma ordered a retreat, but was completely ignored by his troops who continued to fight. The fighting lasted a little over an hour, until Sakuma ordered 20 riflemen to scale a cliff to his left and fire on the natives from above while the men in the river continued to press them. Upon seeing the 20 riflemen atop the cliff, the natives retreated. The Mudan lost 16 men including their chief, Agulu, and his son with many more wounded. The Japanese suffered seven casualties including an officer and 30 wounded.

The Japanese army split into three forces and headed in different directions, the south, north, and central routes. The south route army was ambushed by the Kuskus tribe and lost three soldiers. A counterattack defeated the Kuskus fighters and the Japanese burned their villages. The central route was attacked by Mudan and two or three soldiers were wounded. The Japanese burned their villages. The north route attacked the Nünai village. On 3 June, they burned all the villages that had been occupied. On 1 July, the new leader of the Mudan tribe and the chief of Kuskus admitted defeat and promised not to harm shipwrecked castaways. Surrendered indigenous people were given Japanese flags to fly over their villages. They were viewed as a symbol of peace with Japan and protection from rival tribes by the indigenous people. To the Japanese, it was a symbol of jurisdiction over the indigenous Taiwanese. Chinese forces arrived on 17 June and a report by Fujian Administration Commissioner reported that all 56 representatives of the tribes except for Mudan, Zhongshe and Linai, who were not present due to fleeing from the Japanese, complained about Japanese bullying.

A Chinese representative, Pan Wei, met with Saigō four times between 22 and 26 June but nothing came of it. The Japanese settled in and established large camps with no intention of withdrawing, but in July, there was an outbreak of malaria. Both American foreign advisors contracted it, and while Wasson survived, Cassel died from the malaria he contracted on the expedition in spring the next year, 1875. In August and September 600 soldiers fell ill. They started dying 15 a day. The death toll rose to 561. Toshimichi Okubo arrived in Beijing on 10 September and seven negotiating sessions occurred over a month long period. The Western Powers pressured China not to cause bloodshed with Japan as it would negatively impact the coastal trade. The resulting Peking Agreement was signed on 30 October. Japan gained the recognition of Ryukyu as its vassal and an indemnity payment of 500,000 taels. Japanese troops withdrew from Taiwan on 3 December.

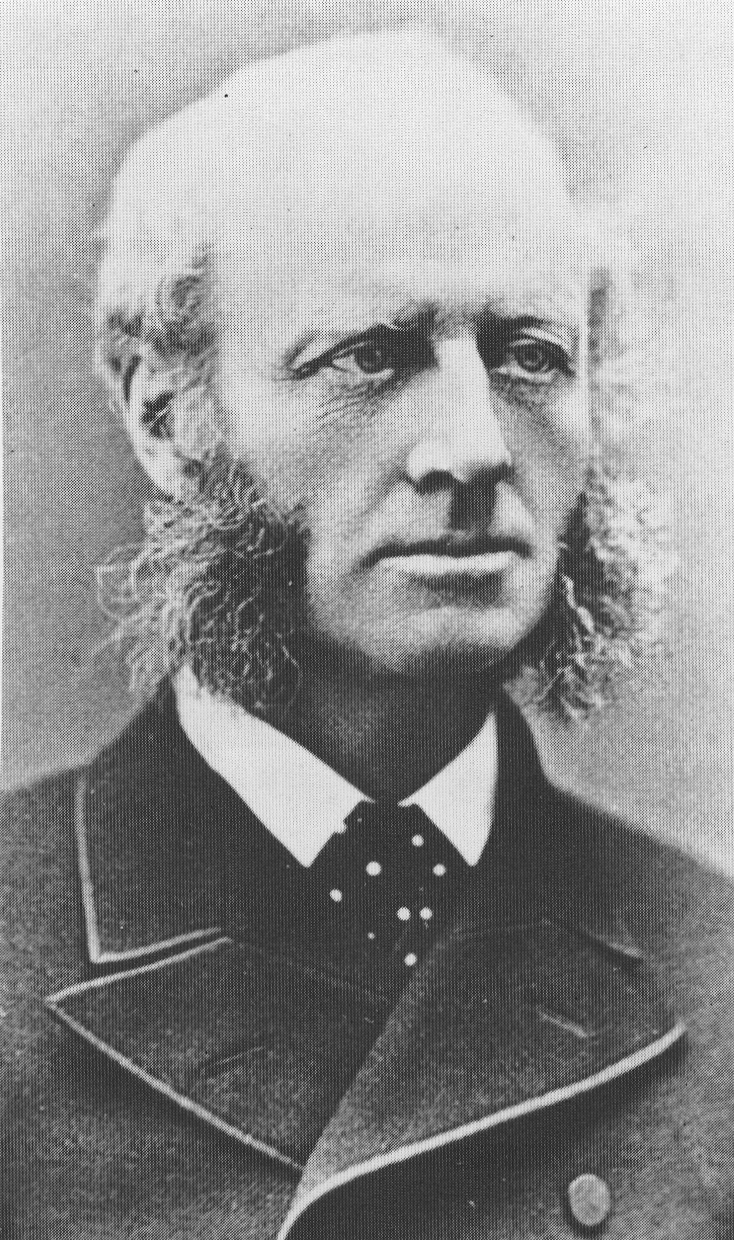
Sir Harry Parkes

== Legacy ==
Although launched ostensibly to punish the local tribesmen for their murder of 54 Ryukyuan merchants, the 1874 punitive expedition to Taiwan served a number of purposes for Japan's new Meiji government. Japan had for some time begun claiming suzerainty, and later sovereignty, over the Ryūkyū Kingdom, whose traditional suzerain had been China, though it had also been a feudatory of the by then defunct Satsuma Domain since the 17th century. The expedition demonstrated that China was not in effective control of Taiwan, let alone the Ryukyu Islands. Japan was emboldened to more forcefully assert its claim to speak for the Ryukyuan islanders. While Japan won an indemnity from China, it also conceded China's sovereignty over Taiwan.

The settlement in 1874, brokered by the British, included a reference to Chinese recognition that the Japanese expedition was "in protection of civilians", a reference that Japan later pointed towards as Chinese renunciation of its rights over Ryukyu. In 1879 Japan referred the dispute to British arbitration, and the British confirmed Japanese sovereignty over the Ryukyus, a result which was not recognised by China.

The expedition also served as a useful rehearsal for future Japanese imperial ambitions. Taiwan was already being viewed as a potential Japanese colony in some circles in Japan.

More generally, the Japanese incursion into Taiwan in 1874 and the feeble Chinese response was a blatant revelation of Chinese weakness and an invitation to further foreign encroachment in Taiwan. In particular, the success of the Japanese incursion was among the factors influencing the French decision to invade Taiwan in October 1884, during the Sino-French War. The Qing court belatedly attempted to strengthen its hold on Taiwan. Chinese imperial commissioner Shen Baozhen built the Batongguan Trail in 1875 across the island's rugged interior to encourage Han settlement in the mountains and better subjugate the indigenous population.

== See also ==
- General Sherman Incident
- Battles for Shimonoseki
- J. R. Wasson
- Rover incident and the consequent Formosa Expedition
- Tani Tateki
