= Ernie Wasson =

American gardener, horticulturist and author

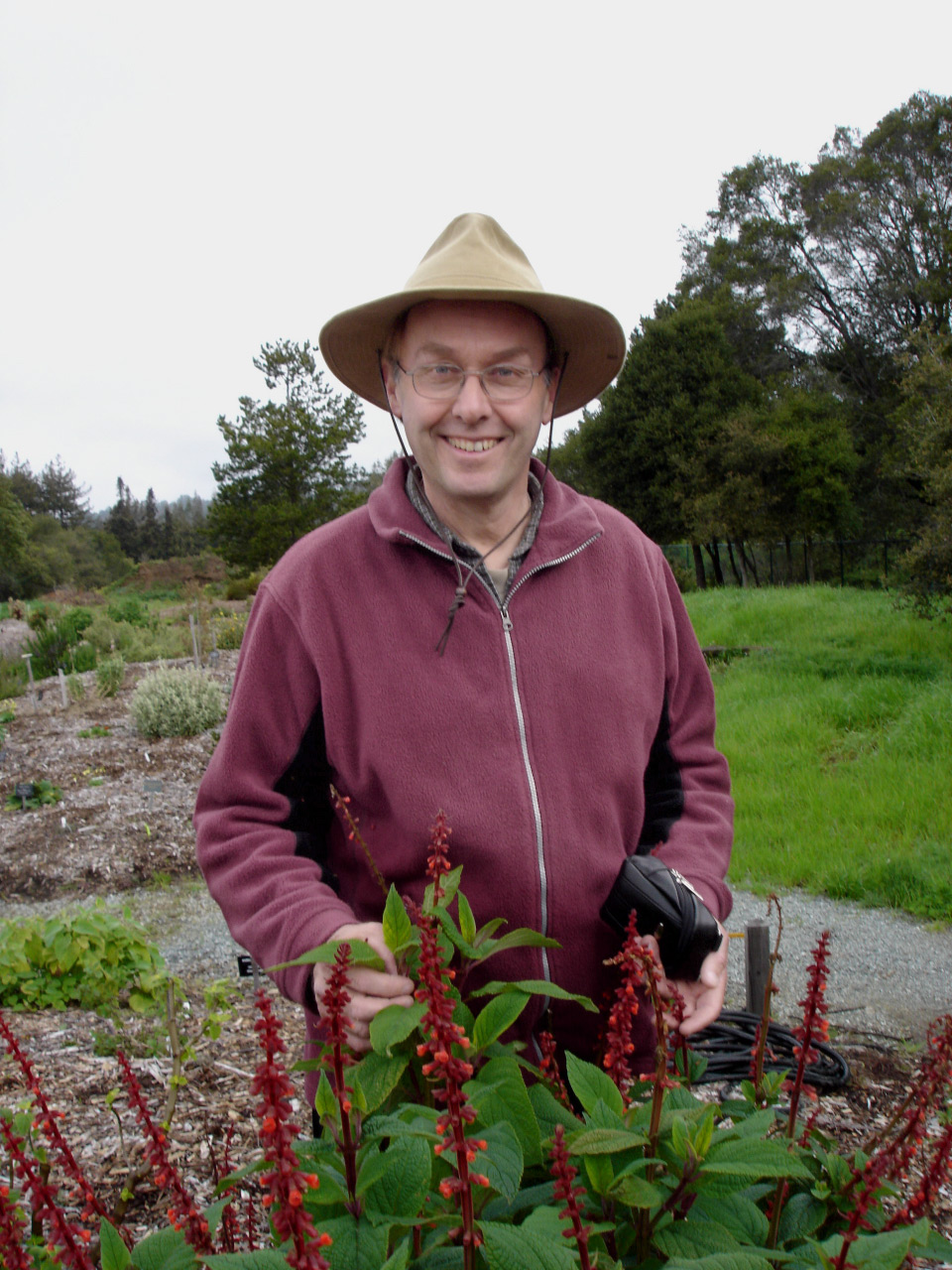
- Wasson with Salvia confertiflora, 2005
- Born: Ernie George Wasson; January 10, 1950 (age 76); Berkeley, California, U.S.
- Education: Humboldt State University
- Occupations: gardener, horticulturist, author

Ernie George Wasson (born January 10, 1950, in Berkeley, California) is an American gardener, horticulturist and author.

Wasson studied from 1968 to 1974 at Humboldt State University, where he graduated as a Bachelor of Science in Geography in 1974. From 1978 to 1981, Wasson was a partner in the Northwoods Nursery in Arcata, California, and from 1979 to 1981, he was a horticultural instructor at the College of the Redwoods. He graduated from the Longwood Graduate Program in Ornamental Horticulture and Public Garden Management in the University of Delaware as a Master of Science.

From 1985 to 1990 he was the Superintendent of the Green Animals Topiary Gardens in Portsmouth, Rhode Island. Wasson worked as a California Certified Nursery Professional for the Berkeley Horticultural Nursery from 1991 to 1998. He was the American Co- Chief Editor for the North American edition of the 1997 botany publication Botanica. Wasson also wrote an internet column entitled "All Plants Considered" from 1997 to 2000. From 1998 to 2015, he was the curator and nursery manager of a teaching garden at Cabrillo College in Aptos, California.

His professional interests include bold foliage plants, Dogwood, culinary ethnobotany, horticulture reference books, fall color, native plants, Nature Printing Society, Podophyllum, pruning, salvias, sassafras, and vegetables.

Ernie Wasson lives in Dunsmuir, California.

== Bibliography ==
- Original Australian publication of 1997: Gordon Cheers (ed.): "Botanica. The Illustrated A-Z of over 10,000 Garden Plants and How to Cultivate Them". Random House Australia, Sydney (Australia) 1997, ISBN 0-09-183806-1
- Trees & shrubs: illustrated A-Z of over 8500 plants. Global Book Pub., Willoughby, New South Wales, Australia 2001, ISBN 978-1-74048-007-9
- Republication with different title: The complete encyclopedia of trees and shrubs. Thunder Bay Press, San Diego, California 2003, ISBN 978-1-59223-055-6
- Richard G. Turner Jr., Ernie Wasson (Chief Editors): Botanica, The Illustrated A-Z of over 10,000 Garden Plants and How to Cultivate Them, Random House Australia, 1997
  - de:Botanica: Das ABC der Pflanzen. 10.000 Arten in Text und Bild, Köln 2003, Könemann Verlagsgesellschaft, ISBN 3-8331-1600-5 (German edition)
  - Botanica : Encyclopédie de botanique et d'horticulture Plus de 10.000 plantes du monde entier, Editions Mengès (nouveau tirage 2006), ISBN 2856204643 (French edition)
