= Tohokushinsha Film and Ministry of Internal Affairs and Communications scandal =

2012–2021 political scandal in Japan

The Tohokushinsha Film logo

The MIC logo

The Tohokushinsha Film and Ministry of Internal Affairs and Communications scandal was a scandal in Japan involving the Ministry of Internal Affairs and Communications.

== Background ==
Article 75 of the Radio Act provides for the revocation of a radio station's license if foreign companies and individuals own more than 20% of a certain broadcasting company in Japan.

Tohokushinsha Film Corporation which operated a satellite channel as a major broadcaster, discovered the illegal status of its foreign shareholding in August 2017. By the end of the month, the situation had been reported to the head of the General Affairs Division of the Ministry of Internal Affairs and Communications (MIC), but the MIC has neither revocated Tohokushinsha's license nor requested the entity to take some actions to rectify the violation.

== Investigation ==
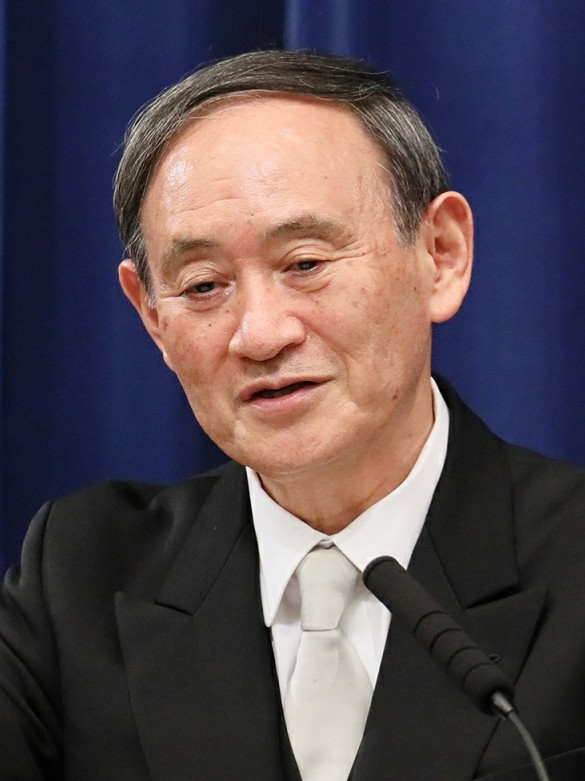
Yohishihide Suga

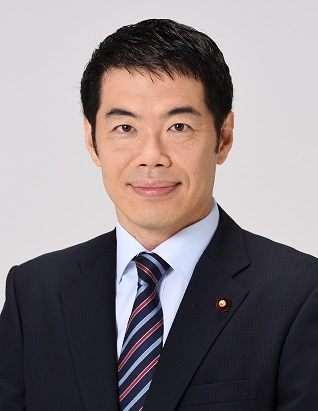
Masayoshi Shintani

=== Initial report ===
On 3 February, the Shukan Bunshun released its report and evidence photographs that cast doubt on the MIC officials not to have recalled the company on the contrary of being informed of a legal violation regarding foreign ownership of the broadcasting company, due to the illegal preferential treatment from its executives including Seigoh Suga, the son of Deputy Prime Minister Yoshihide Suga.

=== Investigation committee by the party ===
On 12 February, Tohokushinsha set up an investigation committee to scrutinize the entertainment for officials by its own executives The committee eventually found that 13 MIC officials had been treated to lavish meals and wines on 54 occasions and that 20 times of those dinners were not listed in the reception reports published by the MIC from July 2016 until December 2020.

=== The internal inspection ===
On 24, the MIC dismissed the 13 officials including the Vice-Minister for Policy CoordinationYasuhiko Taniwaki, the MIC and other additional officials. The Tohokushinsha's reception with its president contained Taxi-tickets, lavish food, and other gift souvenirs to go.

=== The second report and denials ===
On 3 March, the Shukan Bunshun revealed the similar entertainments by NTT to the MIC officials.

On the same day, House of Representatives Budget Committee summoned Taniwaki who then testified that the MIC did not violate the National Public Service Ethics Act.

=== The review committee of MIC ===
The MIC announced that it would set up a review committee of experts, to be chaired by the State Minister for the MIC Masayoshi Shintani, who was elected from Hiroshima, appointed to the State Minister by PM Suga and took office on 20 September 2020.

As a result, Shintani resigned from the role and the MIC reassembled the committee to exclude all MIC officials from its body.

=== The third report ===
However, The Sukan Bunshun Online on 10 March revealed that Shintani's secretary was receiving entertainment from the Nippon Telegraph and Telephone Corporation (NTT) in November 2020, that Shintani and punished Vice-Minister Taniwaki were schoolmates at the private school Aikoku Gakuen Junior College, and that Shintani himself was scheduled to have a dinner with Tohokushinsha in January 2021.

On 16 March, the House of Representatives Budget Committee summoned Tohokushinsha president Shinya Nakajima, NTT president Jun Sawada, MIC's director of the Global Strategy Bureau, and Taniwaki again. The MIC officials testified that they had not been informed of the violation by the company.

On 4 June, the MIC announced it had newly discovered that other executives had received a total of 78 entertainments from NTT or Tohokusinsha and punished 32 officials involved in the matter.

== Laws ==
- 1950 to current Inheritance Tax Act has the tax exemption rules for political funds and the asset of religious institutions.
- The draft of the United Nations Convention Against Transnational Organized Crime (UNTOC) came out December 1998, before the 2001 Central Government Reform led by Yoshiro Mori Administration.
- The Reform established the Deputy Prime Minister of the Cabinet, called "Fuku-sohri", the State Ministers of the Ministries ("Fuku-Daijin") and the Parliamentary Vice-Ministers ("Daijin-Seimukan"), all of which have no duty of disclosure of the assets of its spouse and children under the then newly established the Fundamental Cord for the Ministers, the Deputy Ministers, and the Parliamentary Vice-Ministers ("Kokumu-Daijin, Fuku-Daijin, oyobi Daijin-Seimukan Kihan").
- Shinzo Abe administration accepted the UNTOC and United Nations Convention against Corruption in 2017. Both conventions remained unratified in 2023.
- The National Personnel Authority was led by the Commissioner Naomi Ichimiya, a former judge of the High Court and later a member of the Tokyo Bar Association's legal professions, who was appointed as the President by PM Abe in 2014 and served 2 terms of 8 years until 22 June 2021. (Note: The leading political party would have the power either to promote or relegate officials if the NPA were disfigured and misconducted against the appealants on relegations or the whistleblowers conforming to their filing duty, article 239.2 of the Code of Criminal Procedure. (Note: "A government official or local government official must file an accusation when they believe an offense has been committed." (CCP 239.2.))) For a similar period a Keidanren high executive Hiroshi Tachibana, also served as one of three Commissioners. (Note: Tachibana was replaced by Microsoft Japan high executive Katsura Ito in April 2022.)
- Major newspapers in Japan frequently avoid reporting the names of foreign companies that own Japanese companies. (Note: There are even few academic papers which reported on the 1600s Dutch East India Company which supported the Shogunate, the 1870s Walsh brothers in the Last days of the Shogunate, or the 1900s J & P Coats which operated the Teikoku Seishi sewing thread factory Japan.)

== See also ==
- D complex - One of the leading television program production companies owned by a foreign company and NEXTEP, and was acquired by FUJI Media Holdings in 2012.
- Yokohama Band
- Kumamoto Band
- Hokkaido Band
