= Walsh brothers (merchants) =

American merchant in Bakumatsu and Meiji Japan

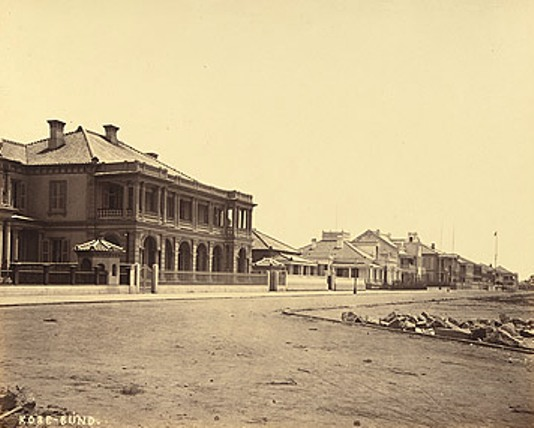
The Walsh and Hall Company in Kobe Foreign Settlement in 1872

The Walsh brothers—Thomas Walsh (1827–1900), John Greer Walsh, (1829–1897), Richard James Walsh (1831–1881) and Robert George Walsh (1841–1886)—were supposed American merchants described in Japanese bibliography as the founders of the Walsh, Hall and the company.

After Tokugawa shogunate Japan opened up the port to the foreign trade, the brothers established the Walsh and Company (later Walsh, Hall and Company) in Nagasaki, which became the first and most successful American trading and insurance company during the last days of the shogunate and Meiji Restoration. They also introduced Western engineers and intellectuals to Japan under the Meiji Emperor.

== Early period ==
Most English bibliographies indicate that Walsh, Hall and Co, America's leading trading house in 19th century Japan was founded by Francis Hall, contrary to the opinions below, which are based on Japanese bibliographies.

The brothers were born into a respectable immigrant family from Ireland to the US, lived in Yonkers in the state of New York and went into business in Shanghai under the Qing Dynasty. (Note: Other British printer Walsh & Company was also in Shanghai.)

== In Japan (1855–1897) ==
Around 1855, the brothers moved to Nagasaki, Japan, to run a trading business after the Japanese government established the Nagasaki Foreign Settlement in 1854.

In 1859, together with George Rogers Hall, a graduate doctor of Harvard Medical School, the brothers founded Walsh, Hall and Company in Yokohama when the port of Yokohama opened to foreign ships under the Treaty of Amity and Commerce, and the company began trading in gold, silk, tea and camphor at the Yokohama Trading Post. (Note: The port of Yokohama was unofficially opened to foreign trade in 1858.) In the same year, John was appointed to the US Consulate in Nagasaki by the Consulate General Townsend Harris. and served until 1865.

After the Meiji Restoration and Boshin War, the company established the Kobe Trading Post in the Kobe Foreign Settlement and the brothers also moved again to Kobe around 1871.

In 1875, two younger brothers went back to the US to learn the paper industry, and the following year, together with former British minister and advisor Rutherford Alcock, Thomas and John established the Kobe Paper Mill, using the machines made in US. (Note: Around the time, Japanese government began to print their banknote Meiji Tsuho by themselves, which has been printed in Frankfurt before.)

But the company prospered by selling arms and warships to the Japanese government, while the government was in the process of building its modernised army, signing the First Geneva Convention and opening the first Japanese Red Cross hospital. Also, the company was one of the agents for the British company, Yangtze Insurance Association in Shanghai.

After First Sino-Japanese War, John's sudden death in 1897 shocked Thomas and the family. (Note: The cause of his death was yet not known.) Thomas lost his passion for business and sold the paper mill to the former Japanese president of the Mitsubishi group, Hisaya Iwasaki, and then moved to Switzerland.

The company was taken over by the next American president, Arthur Otis, and he transferred the head office to the Yokohama Trading Post in 1899. Later The building of Kobe Trading Post sold to the British bank The Hongkong and Shanghai Banking Corporation.

== Family ==
Like other traders, John married a Japanese woman, Rin Yamaguchi around 1862, then he had a daughter Aiko.

== Others ==
- It is known in Japan that Walsh, Hall and Co was one of the companies that sold warships to Japan's historical figure Ryoma Sakamoto, who intended to develop Ezo (Hokkaido), although it was mainly developed by the US engineers and intellectuals after Sakamoto was assassinated in Kyoto. (Note: See also the Ohmiya incidents.)
- In 1871, the company was sued at the Yokohama consular court by Japanese investor Hachibei Ito, the step-father of Eiichi Shibusawa, for window dressing, and the court dismissed the case.

== See also ==
- Anglo-Japanese relations
- Foreign cemeteries in Japan
- Union Insurance Society of Canton
- Arms industry

Members of the company

- Martin Behr
- Robert Walker Irwin
- Masuda Takashi
- Gottfried Wagener

Others

- Perry Expedition
- List of Westerners who visited Japan before 1868
- Robert H. Pruyn
- James R. Wasson
- Douglas R. Cassel
- Henry Walton Grinnell
- William Elliot Griffis
- Thomas Blake Glover
- Harry Smith Parkes
- Richard Henry Brunton
- Joseph Henry Longford
- Ernest Satow
- Bertram Freeman-Mitford, 1st Baron Redesdale
- Alexander Cameron Sim
- Henry Dyer
- Foreign government advisors in Meiji Japan
- Ryoma Sakamoto
- Chōshū Five
- Yataro Iwasaki
- Kentaro Kaneko
  - American Unitarian Association
