= Tani Tateki =

Japanese politician

Viscount Tani Tateki
- 谷 干城
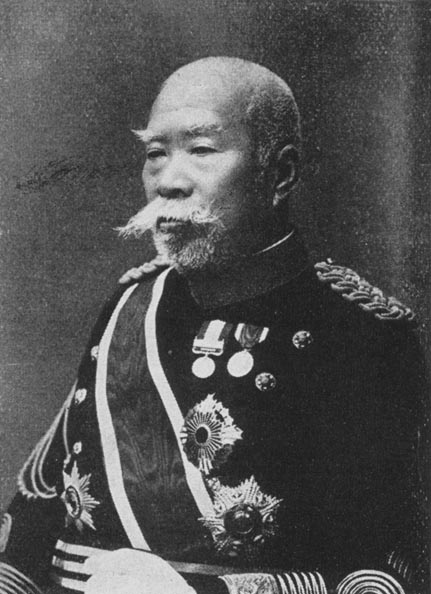

Minister of Agriculture and Commerce
- In office 22 December 1885 – 26 July 1887
- Prime Minister: Itō Hirobumi
- Preceded by: Office established
- Succeeded by: Hijikata Hisamoto

Member of the House of Peers
- In office 10 July 1890 – 13 May 1911 Elected by the Viscounts

Personal details
- Born: 18 March 1837 Kubokawa, Tosa, Japan
- Died: 13 May 1911 (aged 74) Shinjuku, Tokyo, Japan
- Awards: Order of the Rising Sun, 1st class

Military service
- Allegiance: Empire of Japan
- Branch/service: Imperial Japanese Army
- Years of service: 1871–1905
- Rank: Lieutenant General
- Battles/wars: Boshin War; Satsuma Rebellion; Taiwan Expedition of 1874

Tani Tateki (谷 干城; 18 March 1837 – 13 May 1911) was a statesman and lieutenant general in the Imperial Japanese Army in Meiji period Japan. He was also known as Tani Kanjō.

== Early life ==
Tani was born in Kubokawa village, Tosa Province (present-day Shimanto town, Kōchi Prefecture) as the 4th son of a Confucian scholar. All three of his elder brothers died in childhood, and he was given to his uncle to be raised as an upper-class samurai in the service of the Yamauchi clan. His abilities were soon noted by clan officials, a and he was sent for further studies in Edo in 1859. While in Edo, he studied under Yasui Sokken and other leading Confucian scholars, and returned to Tosa in 1861. In 1862, he was appointed an instructor at the Chidōkan, the han school; however, he also became involved in the local sonnō jōi movement led by Takechi Hanpeita. He was one of the members of Takechi's followers implicated in the assassination of Yoshida Tōyō. Following Takechi's arrest and execution, he was out of favor until 1865, when he was allowed to resume his duties at the Chidōkan. In 1866, he was ordered by his domain to go to Nagasaki, where he met Gotō Shōjirō and Sakamoto Ryōma, who gradually convinced him of the futility of attempting to preserve Japan's national isolation policy. In 1867, he made a secret trip to Shanghai, where he observed first-hand the military superiority of the western powers and the possible fate which awaited Japan. After his return, he agreed to work with Saigō Takamori, whom he met in Edo the following year, and to work for an alliance between Tosa and Satsuma.

== Military career ==
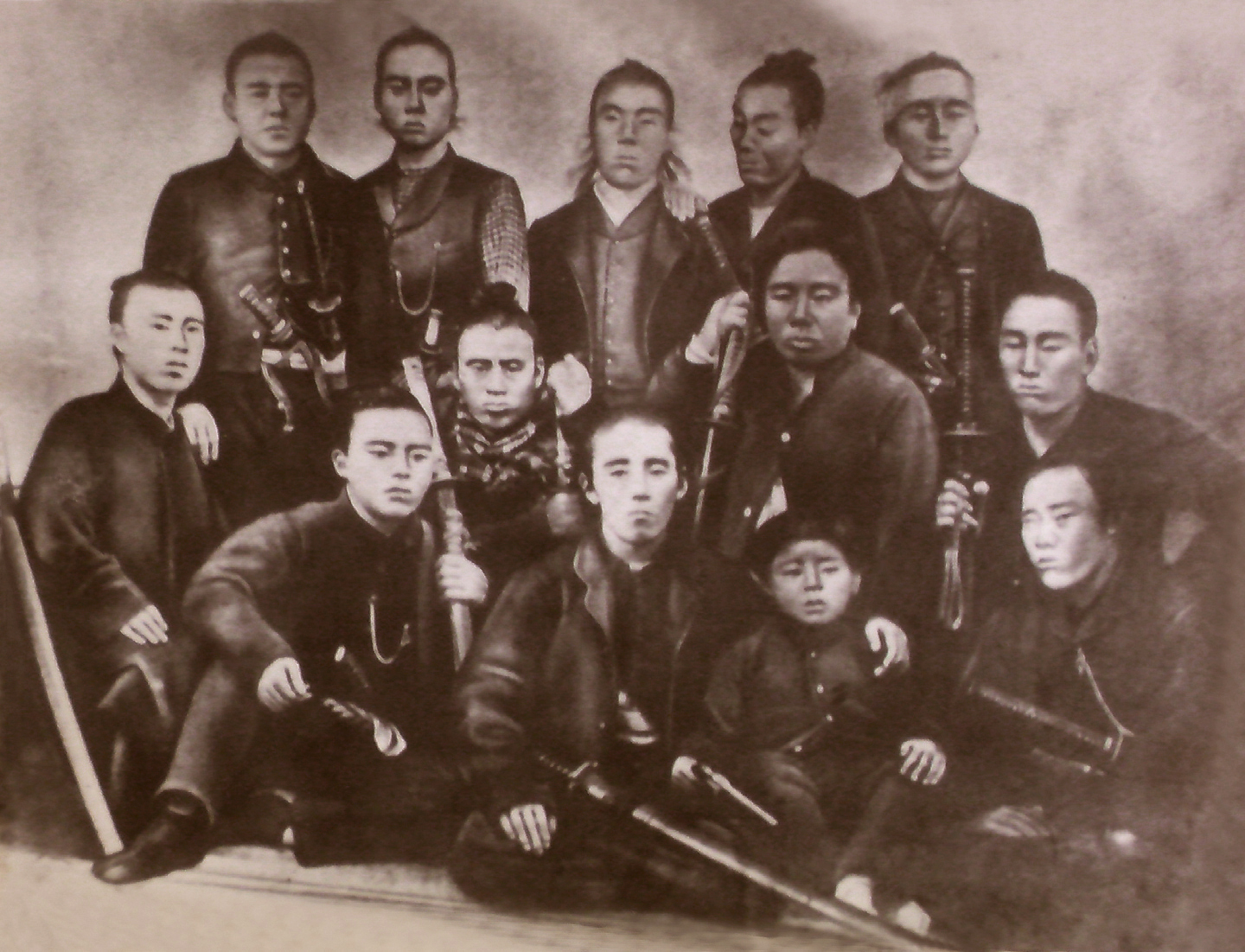
Jinshotai(From the left in the bottom row: Ban Gondayu, Itagaki Taisuke, Tani Otoi(young boy), Yamaji Motoharu. From the left in the middle row: Tani Shigeki(Sinbei), Tani Tateki(Moribe), Yamada Kiyokado(Heizaemon), Yoshimoto Sukekatsu(Heinosuke). From the left in the top row: Kataoka Masumitsu(Kenkichi), Manabe Masayoshi(Kaisaku), Nishiyama Sakae, Kitamura Shigeyori(Chobei), Beppu Hikokuro.)

From 1868, Tani fought in the Boshin War to overthrow the Tokugawa shogunate, beginning with the Battle of Toba-Fushimi, the Battle of Kōshū-Katsunuma and continuing with the Battle of Aizu. In 1869, he was appointed a junior councilor, and spent the next three years in Tosa, reforming the clan's government, while his fellow clansmen, Itagaki Taisuke and Gotō Shōjirō remained in Tokyo. He spoke out strongly against the profligate spending of the Tosa delegation in Tokyo and enacted cost reduction measures, which enraged Gotō, who had Tani removed. However, this did not solve the underlying problem to the clan's finances, as Tani was returned to his post in April 1871.

Following the establishment of the Imperial Japanese Army in 1872, Tani accepted the rank of major general. He became commander of the Kumamoto garrison the following year, and worked closely with Yamagata Aritomo to reform the army along French lines, over the opposition of Itagaki and Kirino Toshiaki, He personally led troops to suppress a number of samurai uprisings in Kyūshū, including the Saga Rebellion and Shimpūren Rebellion, and withstood a siege of 52 days in Kumamoto castle against Saigō Takamori during the Satsuma Rebellion.

Tani also took part in the Taiwan Expedition of 1874, where one of the US foreign advisors of the expedition, Lt. Cdr. Douglas Cassel, would criticize him as a "little imbecile" in private letters to Charles Le Gendre.

In November 1878, Tani was promoted to lieutenant general and was commandant of the Imperial Japanese Army Academy and the Toyama School. He retired in March 1881 in protest over government policies and returned to Kōchi.

== Political career ==
After returning to Kōchi in 1881, Tani was one of the founders of the conservative political party, Chūseitō, which was created to challenge Itagaki's Freedom and People's Rights Movement. He also became president of the Gakushūin Peers’ School in 1884.

Tani's political views, as they became known in the 1880s and the 1890s were a mix of conservatism, liberalism and staunch anti-Imperialism. Tani was one of the leaders of a group called the "conservative opposition", an alliance of retired generals, politicians and peers who were critical both of the Meiji government and the movement for popular rights. Leading members in the conservative opposition, including Tani, believed that the "nation" is composed of a mystical union between Emperor and people, and therefore the government should rest neither with the oligarchs nor with the political parties. In his constitutional proposals, Tani had suggested to raise the Emperor to a status of an arbitrator between three independent branches of government - the executive, the judicial and the legislative, balanced by a set of checks and balances but dependent on the discretion of the Imperial Throne. Though critical of the "selfishness" of the political parties, he was a supporter of the freedoms of speech and assembly.

In 1885, Tani joined the first Itō Hirobumi cabinet as the first Minister of Agriculture & Commerce, however, he soon resigned over dissatisfaction with what he perceived to be the weak and vacillating foreign policy of Inoue Kaoru, especially with regards to the revision of the unequal treaties. Tani's views on foreign policy were a mix of anti-Imperialism and belief in Japan's national essence (Kokutai). As young general, during the Taiwan Expedition of 1874, he advocated occupying southern China, but in the 1880s he reversed his position. He resisted the reforms of Yamagata Aritomo in the army, and believed that Imperial Japanese Army should be kept as a small force for defensive purposes alone. Along with the generals Miura Goro, Torio Koyata and Soga Sukenori he was a co-founder of the "four generals group" who resisted the Prussia-model military reforms of the 1800s. Even after the Sino-Japanese War of 1894 to 1895, when all of Tani's friends to the conservative opposition became enthusiastic about territorial expansion, he was staunchly against any advance to the continent. On the other hand, he was set against any concession to the foreigners in the struggle against the unequal treaties and believed Japan must refrain from alliances with great powers in order to uphold its own unique culture, tradition and national essence. Tani's unique position as a rare anti-Imperialist thinker in the Japanese military establishment, earned him a description by Mutsu Munemitsu, Japan's foreign minister, as a "lone flower in a field of grass."

On 7 July 1884, Tani was ennobled with the rank of shishaku (viscount) in the kazoku peerage system.

Tani's political views were also influenced by a visit he made to Europe from June 1887 to March 1888. He met with Ahmed ʻUrabi in Egypt and saw parallels with Japan's predicament of becoming exhausted by foreign debt created by too-rapid industrialization, and lamented Japan's increasing westernization. He also attended a lecture by Lorenz von Stein in Austria promoting Agrarianism as a political philosophy.

Tani became a member of the House of Peers in 1890. He remained active in politics until his death, strongly opposing imposition of land taxes, favoring the abolishment of poll taxes, sending an investigative team to the Ashio Copper Mine in wake of a lawsuit and scandal over an environmental disaster, and continuing to be a thorn in the side of Yamagata and his efforts to expand the Japanese army. He strongly opposed the Anglo-Japanese Alliance and also opposed the Russo-Japanese War from both a political standpoint and for financial reasons. With the Japanese victory, he was increasingly marginalize in politics and vilified in the media; yet his insistence on mutual demilitarization and free passage between the Soya Strait and the Mamiya Strait were worked into the Portsmouth Treaty ending the war. He died in 1911 at the age of 75.

== Decorations ==
- 1886 – Grand Cordon of the Order of the Rising Sun
- 1911 – Order of the Rising Sun with Paulownia Flowers

=== Foreign ===
- 1890 – Ottoman Empire - Order of the Medjidie

== Footnotes ==
Political offices
Preceded by new creation	Minister of Agriculture & Commerce; Dec 1885 - Jul 1887	Succeeded by Hijikata Hisamoto
Educational offices
Preceded by Tachibana Taneyuki	President, Gakushūin Peers School; 1885-1887	Succeeded by Ōtori Keisuke
