= Yasui Sokken =

- 安井 息軒
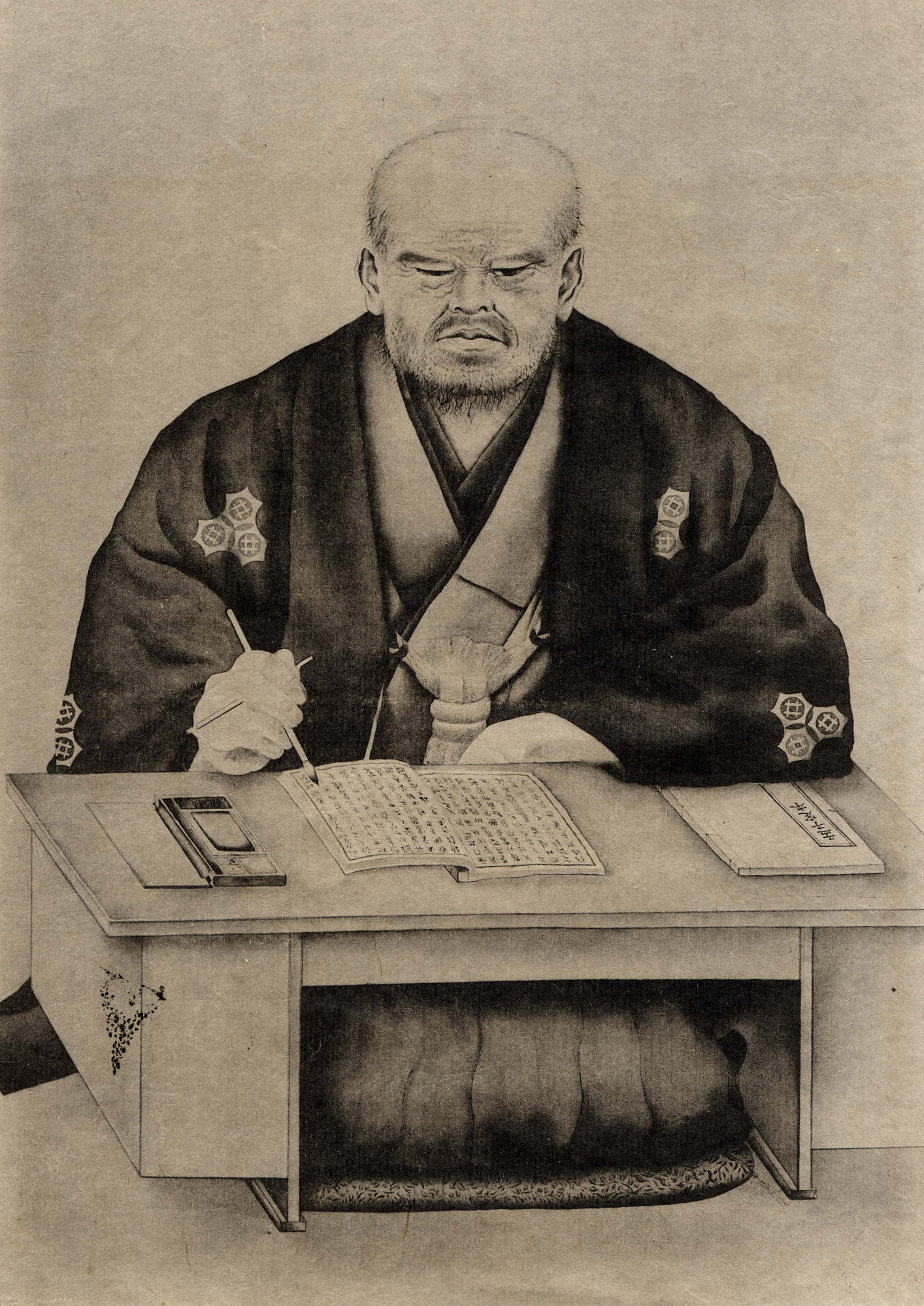
- Yasui Sokken
- Born: January 1, 1799; Kiyotake Hyūga Province, Japan
- Died: September 23, 1876 (aged 77); Tokyo, Japan
- Occupations: Teacher, His students numbered 2000 including influential people
- Known for: Classical scholar of Confucianism

Yasui Sokken (安井 息軒 January 1, 1799 - September 23, 1876) was a classical scholar of Confucianism from Obi Domain, Hyūga Province (now Kiyotake Miyazaki Prefecture) Japan. He educated many notable personalities of Bakumatsu and early Meiji period Japan, including Tani Tateki, Mutsu Munemitsu and Shinagawa Yajiro. His child name was Junsaku and later his name was Chuhei. His Art-name was Sokken. His wife Sayo was the model for Mori Ogai's historical novel Mrs. Yasui. His famous quote is: The plan for the day is in the morning. The plan for the year is in the spring. The plan for the whole life is in the youth.

== Biography ==
Yasui was the second son of Yasui Koshu, a samurai of Obi domain whose served the Itō clan, the daimyō of Obi Domain, for generations. When he was a child he contracted smallpox, and the smallpox scars on his face left him disfigured and blind in one eye. Under the influence of his father, who was a scholar, he aspired to study, and at the age of 21, he studied under Shinozaki Kotake in Osaka, then in 1810 at Shoheizaka Academy (昌平坂学問所) in Edo. Recognized at an early age for his intelligence, he was recalled to Obi Domain in 1826 to teach at the han school alongside his father, and to marry Kawazoe Sayo. The following year, his father opened a private academy named Myōkyōdō, and Sokken became an assistant lecturer. He also began to take part in the domain's politics, and by 1834 he was appointed as advisor to the daimyō of Obi.

At the age of 40 in 1837, Sokken moved to Edo and entered the monk's dormitory at the temple of Zōjō-ji, where he was shunned by conservatives who were not happy with the feudal reforms that the domain was promoting based on Sokken's advice. In 1838, he opened a private school called Sankeijuku in Edo (三計塾). In 1862, he was invited by the Tokugawa shogunate to become a Confucian official at the Shoheizaka Academy with a stipend of 200 koku. During the confusion caused by the Perry Expedition and the threat posed by the kurofune Sokken's advice was sought by Mito Nariaki, although Mito Nariaki died before he could implement any of Sokken's proposals. During the Boshin War, he relocated to what is now Kawaguchi, Saitama. In 1868, following the collapse of the shogunate, he returned to his status as a retainer of Obi Domain, and opened a school with the Obi Domain's Edo mansion. Despite increasing infirmities due to age, he continued to teach and to write until his death in 1876. His grave at the temple of Yogen-ji in Sendaigi in Bunkyō, Tokyo is a designated historical site of Tokyo.

== His Pupils ==
He taught a total of 2000 pupils, including Tani Tateki, Munemitsu Mutsu, Shinagawa Yajiro, Matsumura Kaiseki, Akashi Motojiro, Ishimoto Shinroku and many others.

== Yasui Sokken birthplace ==
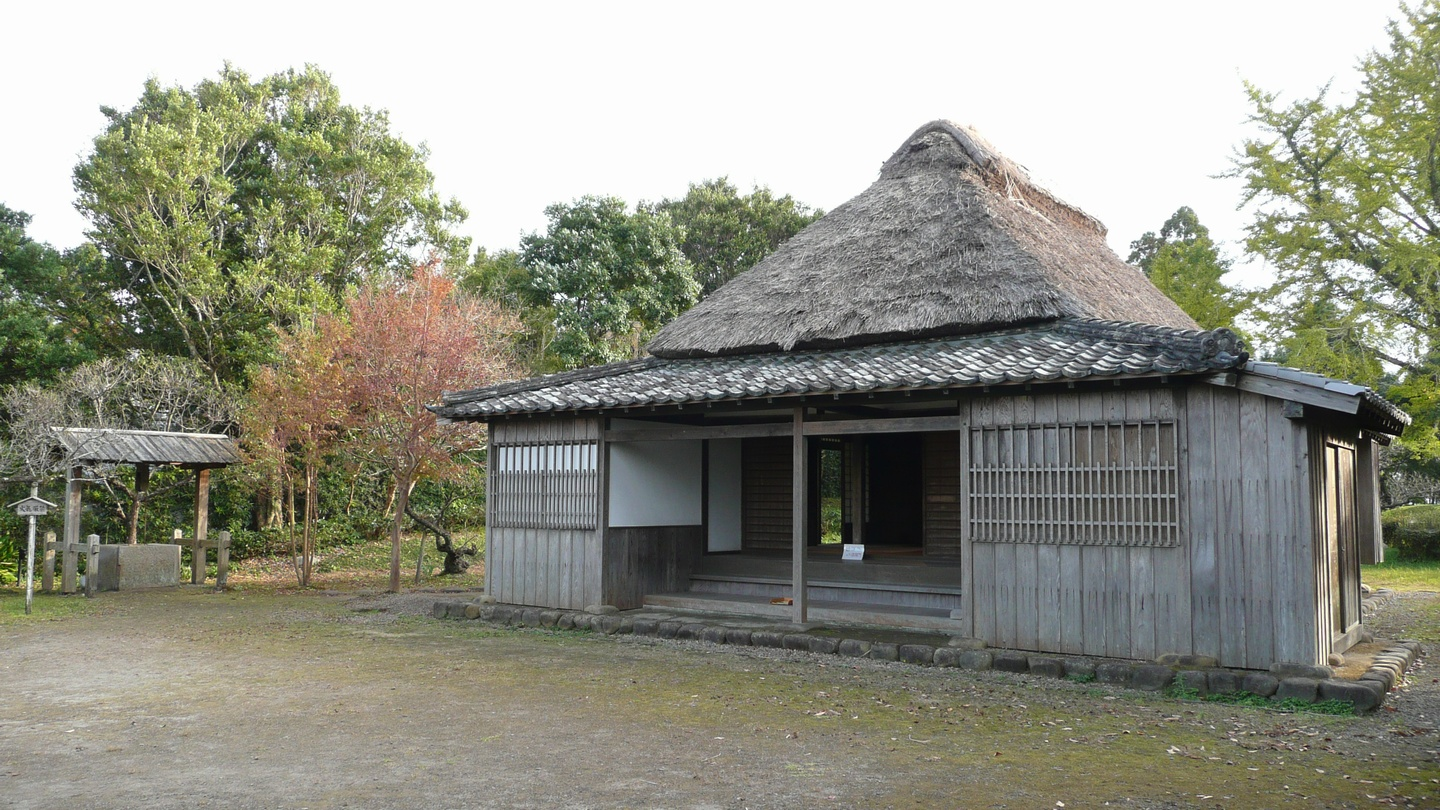
The Birthplace of Yasui Sokken

Yasui Sokke's birthplace is located in Miyazaki City, Kiyotakecho Kano Ko 3376-1, and was designated a National Historic Site in 1979 Across from the former residence is the Kiyotake History Museum, which exhibits materials related to Sokken.

== Partial bibliography ==
- 読書余適:dokushoyoteki:Essay on a travel in Tohoku area
- 海防私議:kaiboshigi:My views on Sea Defense
- 書説摘要:shosekitekiyo:Various views in books
- 靖海問答:Harumimondo:My views on Sea Defense
  - Tokugawa Nariaki asked Sokken for his views on sea defense, but Sokken's views were not accepted because Nariaki died.
- 救急或問:Kyuukyuuarutoi:
- 管子纂話:Kanshisanwa:On Guanzi (text)
- 北潜日抄:Hokusennissho:His diary in Chinese letters
- 左伝輯釈:Sadenshuushaku:on Zuo Zhuan
- 論語集説:Rongoshusetsu:on Analects he wrote a commentary on analects which quotes from three previous sources the shuge and then shuso which is collection of previous commentary then his own comments are an but then later when this was republished as Kanbuntaikei they also added zhu xi so its a good collection of commentary. if you look at shinshaku kanbun taikei they praise this edition
- 弁妄:Benmou:Incoherent talk
- 酔余漫筆:Suiyomanpitsu:Essays written when one is drunk

== See also ==
- List of Historic Sites of Japan (Miyazaki)
