= Yoshi Hijikata =

Japanese theatre director (1898–1959)

- 土方与志
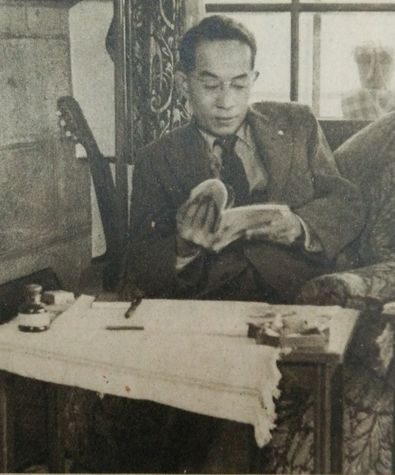
- Yoshi Hijikata in 1948
- Born: 16 April 1898
- Died: 4 June 1959 (aged 61)
- Education: University of Tokyo
- Occupation: Theatre director

Marquess Yoshi Hijikata (土方 与志, Hijikata Yoshi; 16 April 1898 – 4 June 1959) was a prominent Japanese theatre director. His real name was Hisayoshi Hijikata (土方久敬, Hijikata Hisayoshi). He studied at the University of Tokyo.

He had Marxist leanings, and in 1933 traveled to Russia. On his return to Japan in 1941 he was arrested, and remained in prison until 1945. In 1946 he joined the Japanese Communist Party.

He was a grandson of the Meiji politician Hijikata Hisamoto.
