= Nijō Masatsugu =

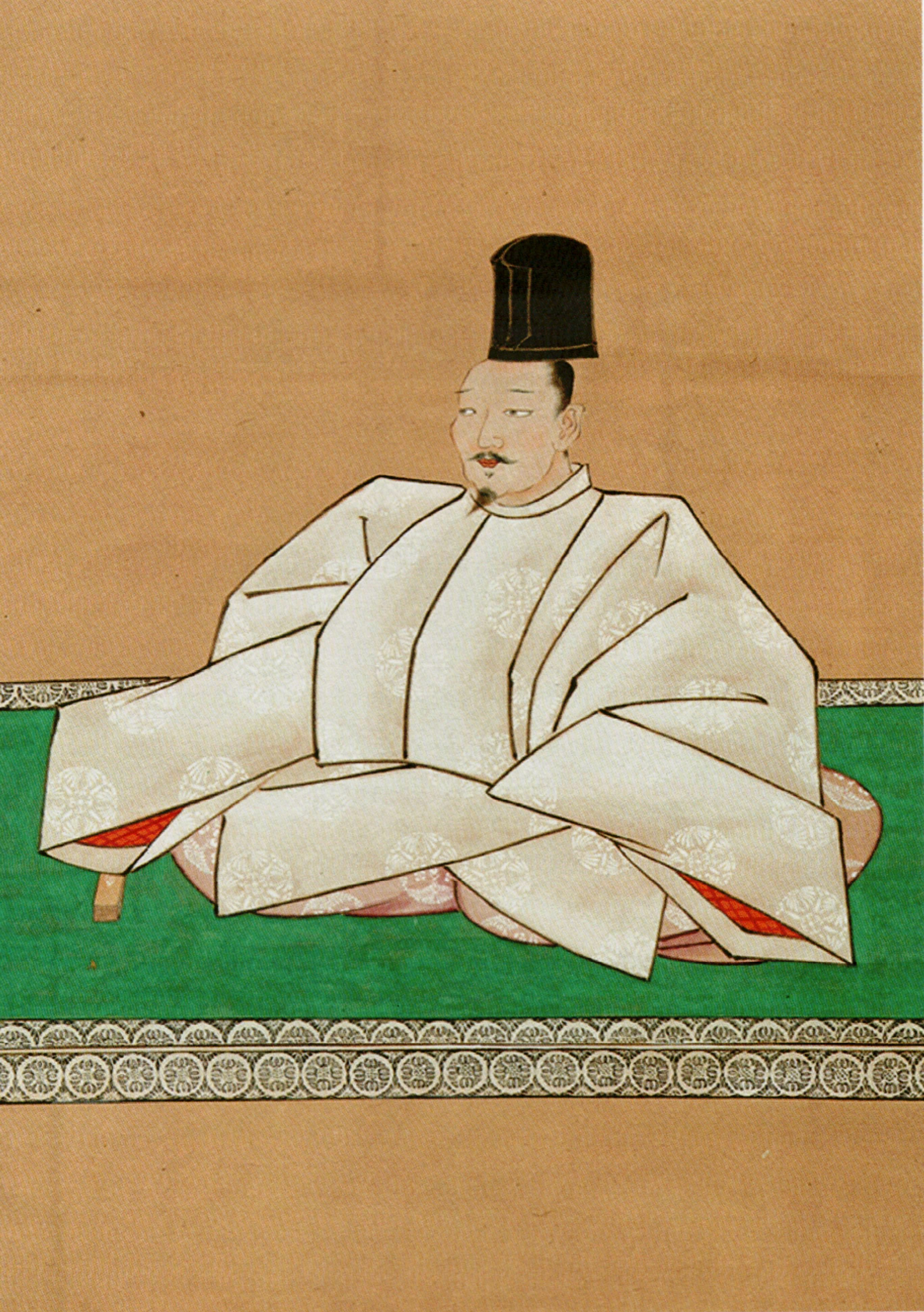

Nijō Masatsugu (二条 政嗣; 1443 – October 14, 1480), son of regent Nijō Mochimichi, was a Japanese kugyō (court noble) of the Muromachi period (1336–1573). He held a regent position kampaku from 1470 to 1476. He was the father of regent Nijō Hisamoto.
