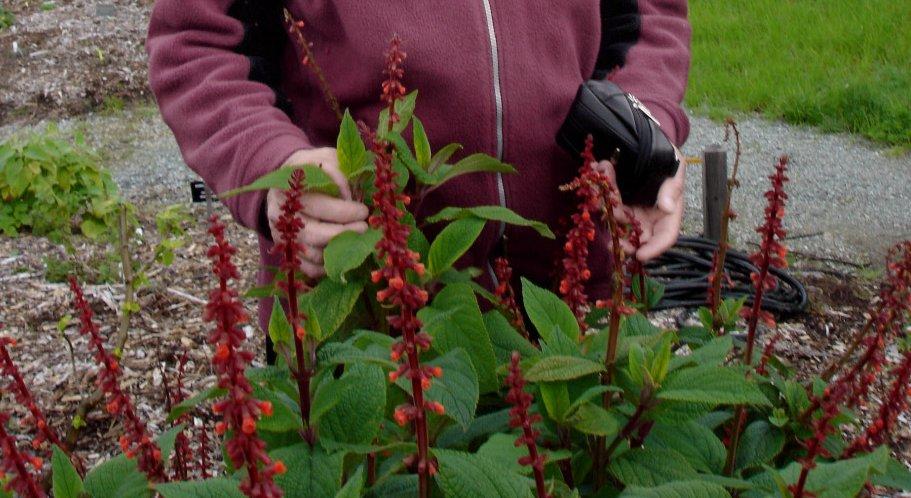

Scientific classification
- Kingdom: Plantae
- Clade: Tracheophytes
- Clade: Angiosperms
- Clade: Eudicots
- Clade: Asterids
- Order: Lamiales
- Family: Lamiaceae
- Genus: Salvia
- Species: S. confertiflora

Binomial name
- Salvia confertiflora Pohl

= Salvia confertiflora =

Species of flowering plant

Salvia confertiflora, the Sabra spike sage, is a species of flowering plant in the family Lamiaceae, native to Brazil. This herbaceous perennial reaches 1–1.5 m (3.3–4.9 ft) in height, and 10–50 cm (3.9–19.7 in) spread in one season, becoming shrubby at the base with age.

The dark green leaves, with a yellow undertone, are about 7 in (18 cm) long by 3.5 in (8.9 cm) wide, with serrated edges, and with velvety red-brown hairs on the petiole and stem of the new leaves. The leaves bear a sage scent. The inflorescences are covered with velvety red-brown hairs, with the stems and the calyx also having a red-brown color. The 0.5 in (1.3 cm) flowers are orange-red, and very profuse, explaining the epithet confertiflora, or "crowded with flowers". The plant grows so large that it needs staking and protection from wind in gardens.

The plant is cultivated as an ornamental in temperate and tropical horticulture. As it does not tolerate freezing temperatures, it requires protection in cold temperate zones, and a sheltered position in full sun.

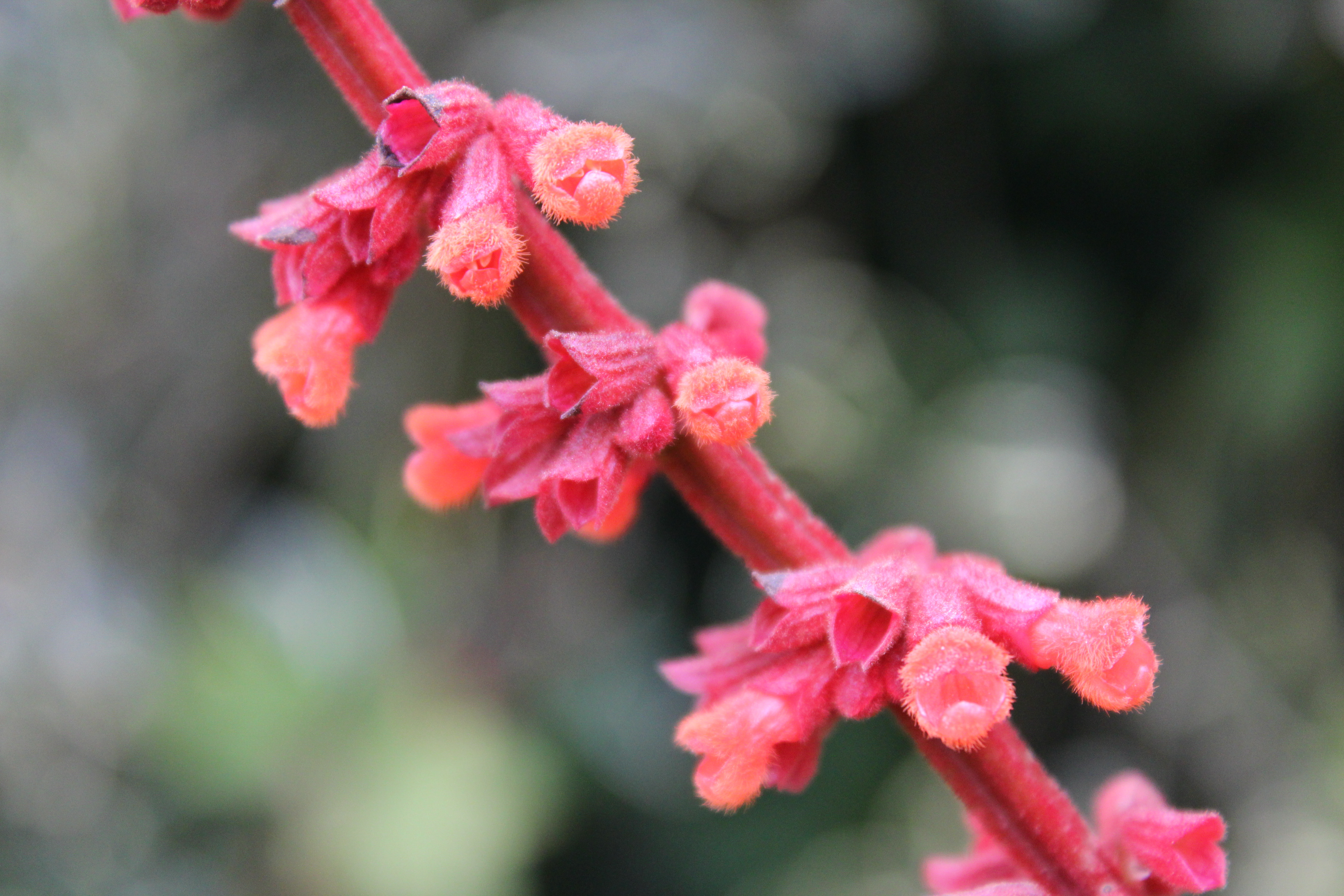
