= Asia Crime Prevention Foundation =

Non-profit organization

Asia Crime Prevention Foundation (ACPF) is a not-for-profit organization that works for peace and stability in Asia with the help of policies related to crime prevention in Asia. The organization was started in Tokyo in 1982 with the support of United Nations Asia and the Far East Institute for the Prevention of Crime and the Treatment of Offenders (UNAFEI). It was granted the special consultative status by the UN in 1991 and reclassified to same status in 2000.

ACPF organizes conferences and lectures, helps develop guidelines, for example (UN Standard Minimum Rules for Noncustodial Measures), and coordinates regional projects. ACPF also worked with the UN to organize Ninth United Nations Congress on the Prevention of Crime and the Treatment of Offenders in 1995.

ACPF works with its national affiliates and has a presence in Sri Lanka, Hongkong and others.
