= Yuichi Hisamoto =

Japanese baseball player

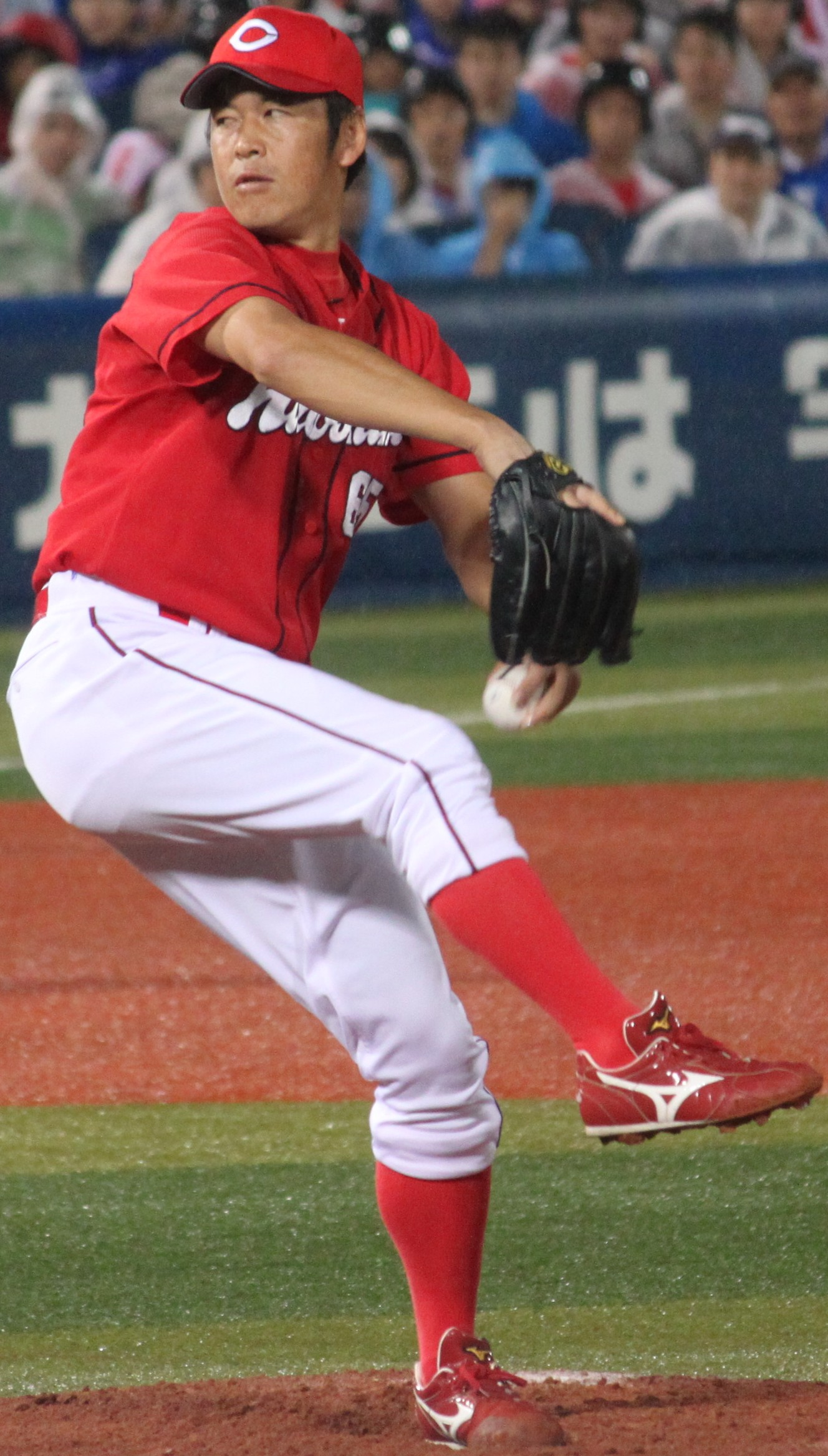
- Hisamoto with the Hiroshima Toyo Carp
- Pitcher
- Born: April 3, 1979 (age 47)
- Bats: Left Throws: Left

NPB debut
- April 28, 2002, for the Chunichi Dragons

NPB statistics (through 2016)
- Win–loss record: 12–8
- ERA: 3.34
- Strikeouts: 278
- Stats at Baseball Reference

Teams
- Chunichi Dragons (2002–2007, 2010–2012); Hiroshima Toyo Carp (2013–2014, 2016)

Yuichi Hisamoto (久本 祐一, Hisamoto Yūichi; born April 3, 1979 in Daitō, Osaka) is a Japanese former professional baseball pitcher in Japan's Nippon Professional Baseball. He played for the Chunichi Dragons from 2002 to 2007 and from 2010 to 2012 and with the Hiroshima Toyo Carp in 2013, 2014, and 2016.
