= Nijō Hisamoto =

- Kampaku (Regent), Udaijin (Minister of the Right)
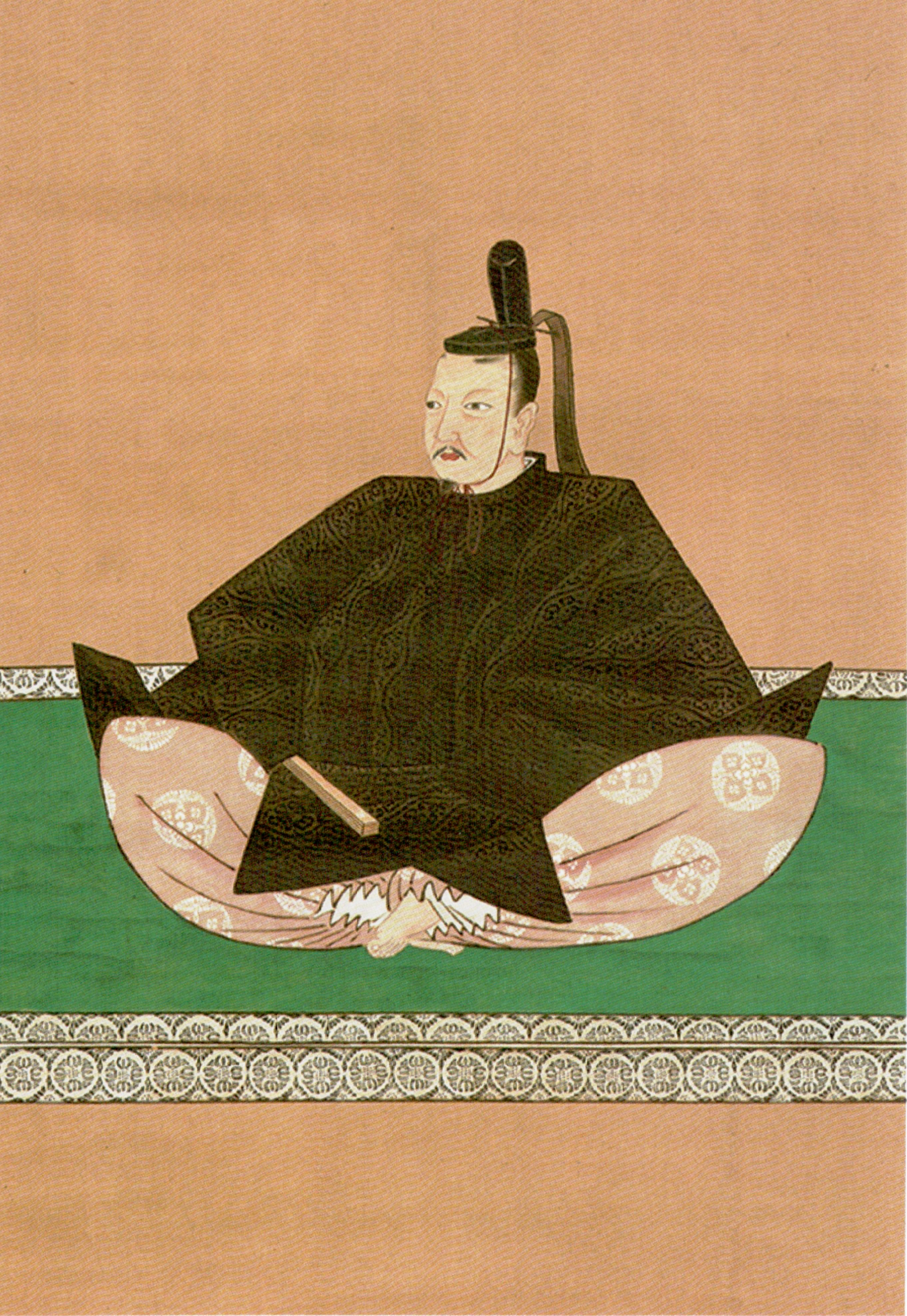
- "Excavation Report of the Family Tomb of the Sesshū Nijō Family" Doshisha University Historical Museum
- Full name: Nijō Hisamoto
- Native name: にじょう ひさもと
- Born: 3rd year of Bunnō era (1471)
- Died: 10th day of the 10th month, Meō 6 (November 4, 1497)
- Noble family: Nijō family
- Spouse: Unknown
- Issue: Nijō Ujihō
- Father: Nijō Masatsugu
- Mother: Minase Kaneko
- Occupation: Japanese court noble

Nijō Hisamoto (二条 尚基; 1471 – November 4, 1497) was a Japanese court noble during the Sengoku period. He was the son of Nijō Masatsugu and Minase Kaneko. He held a regent position kampaku in 1497 and was the father of future regent Nijō Korefusa.

== Genealogy ==
- Father: Nijō Masatsugu (1443–1480)
- Mother: Minase Kaneko (adopted by Minase Kiseki, daughter of Hosokawa Noriharu (Yoshikura) )
- Wife: Unknown
- Children: Nijō Ujihō (1496–1551)
