= Hijikata Hisamoto =

Japanese politician (1833-1918)

Count Hijikata Hisamoto
- 土方 久元
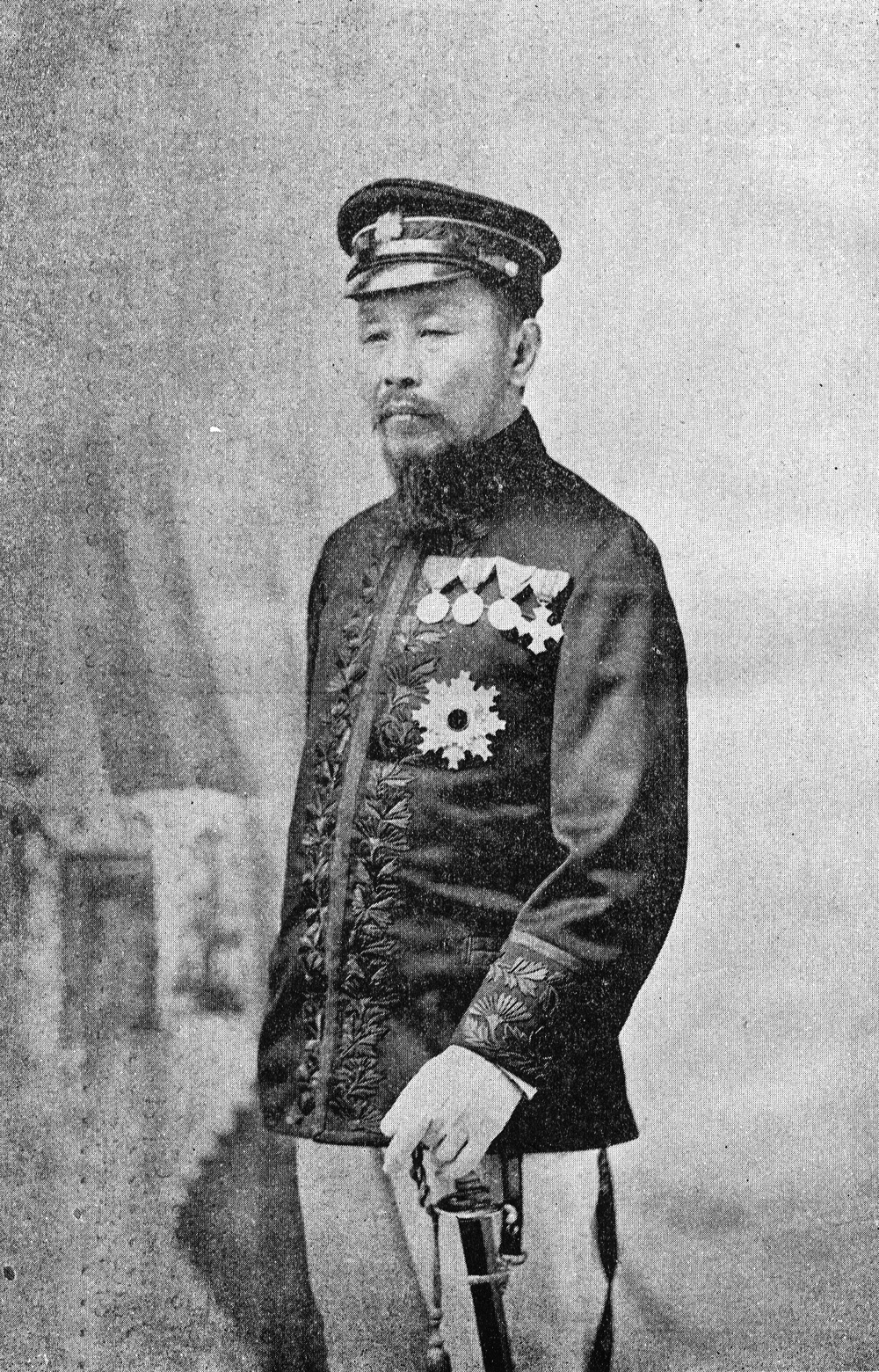
- Hijikata in 1899

Minister of the Imperial Household
- In office 6 September 1887 – 9 February 1898
- Monarch: Meiji
- Preceded by: Itō Hirobumi
- Succeeded by: Tanaka Mitsuaki

Minister of Agriculture and Commerce
- In office 26 July 1887 – 17 September 1887
- Prime Minister: Itō Hirobumi
- Preceded by: Tani Tateki; Yamagata Aritomo (acting); Saigō Jūdō (acting)
- Succeeded by: Kuroda Kiyotaka

Member of the Privy Council
- In office 10 May 1888 – 9 March 1893
- Monarch: Meiji

Personal details
- Born: 23 November 1833 Tosa District, Tosa, Japan
- Died: 4 November 1918 (aged 84) Bunkyō, Tokyo, Japan
- Relatives: Yoshi Hijikata (grandson)

Count Hijikata Hisamoto (土方 久元; 23 November 1833 – 4 November 1918) was a Japanese politician and cabinet minister of the Meiji period.

== Biography ==
Hijikata was a samurai in Tosa Domain (modern-day Kōchi Prefecture). He was sent by the domain to Edo for studies, where he became involved in the sonnō jōi movement, and after returning to Tosa, he joined Takechi Hanpeita's Tosa Kinnō-tō movement. He travelled with Takechi to Kyoto in 1863, where he joined forces with the anti-Tokugawa shogunate forces of Chōshū Domain and made contact with the kuge aristocracy, most notably Sanjō Sanetomi. After the abortive coup against the Shogunate later that year, he was forced into exile with Sanjō to Chōshū. Following the First Chōshū expedition, he fled to Fukuoka Domain together with Sanjō, where he later met with fellow Tosa countrymen Nakaoka Shintarō, and Sakamoto Ryōma whom he assisted in securing Sanjō’s support for the Satchō Alliance.

Following the Meiji restoration, Hijikata joined the Meiji government and was appointed a public prosecutor in Tokyo. He subsequently served in the Imperial Household Ministry and Home Ministry and as Cabinet Secretary to the Daijō-kan cabinet. He was subsequently made a tutor, then an Imperial Councilor to Emperor Meiji, who placed a great deal of confidence in him, and who made him a viscount (shishaku) in the kazoku peerage in 1884.

In 1885, with the establishment of the cabinet system, Hijikata was appointed Minister of Agriculture and Commerce under the 1st Itō Hirobumi administration in 1887, and Imperial Household Ministry from 1887-1898. He was also made a member of the Privy Council from 1888.

Hijikata was awarded the title of count (hakushaku) in 1895. After his retirement from the Imperial Household Ministry, he served as president of Kokugakuin University. He died in 1918 at the age of 86, and his grave is at the Somei Cemetery in Tokyo.

Political offices
Preceded by Itō Hirobumi	Imperial Household Minister; Sept 1887 – Feb 1898	Succeeded by Tanaka Mitsuaki
Preceded by Tani Tateki	Minister of Agriculture & Commerce; Jul 1887 – Sep 1887	Succeeded by Kuroda Kiyotaka
