= James C. Wasson =

American politician

Member of the Mississippi House of Representatives from the Attala County district
- In office January 1916 – January 1920

Personal details
- Born: March 31, 1886 Attala County, Mississippi
- Died: November 1966 (aged 80)
- Party: Democrat

James Carlisle Wasson (March 31, 1886 - November 1966) was a Democratic member of the Mississippi House of Representatives, representing Attala County, from 1916 to 1920.

== Biography ==
James Carlisle Wasson was born on March 31, 1886, in Creek, Attala County, Mississippi. His parents were Newton Copeland Wasson and Mary Jane (Ratliff) Watson. He, along with Icey Day, were elected to represent Attala County in the Mississippi House of Representatives in 1915. He died in November 1966, and was residing in Kosciusko, Mississippi, at that time.
