= Japanese sloop Nisshin =

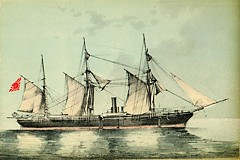
- Japanese warship Nisshin

History
- Name: Nisshin
- Builder: Netherlands
- Laid down: December 29, 1867
- Launched: January 10, 1868
- Commissioned: March 3, 1870
- Decommissioned: March 25, 1892
- Fate: Scrapped 1893

General characteristics
- Displacement: 1,468 long tons (1,492 t)
- Length: 62 m (203 ft 5 in)
- Beam: 9.7 m (31 ft 10 in)
- Draught: 4.9 m (16 ft 1 in)
- Propulsion: reciprocating steam engine, 4 boilers, 1 screw; 710 ihp (530 kW)
- Sail plan: Barque-rigged sloop
- Speed: 9 knots (10 mph; 17 km/h)
- Range: 200 tons of coal
- Complement: 250
- Armament: 1 × 178 mm (7.0 in) muzzle-loading gun; 4 x 160 mm (6.3 in) guns; 2 × 4 pds guns; 1 × 120 mm (4.7 in) mortars

Nisshin (日進; literally, Day by Day) was an iron-ribbed, wooden-hulled three-masted screw sloop with a coal-fired steam engine of the early Meiji period, serving with the fledgling Imperial Japanese Navy.

== Background ==
Nisshin was ordered in the Kingdom of the Netherlands by Saga Domain in 1867 by the domain’s representative to Europe, Sano Tsunetami. It was laid down at C. Gips & Co. at Dordrecht on January 23, 1868, launched on February 20, 1869 and completed on April 12, 1869. The engines were constructed by the factories of Van Vlissingen en Dudok van Heel at Amsterdam and the Netherlands Steamship Company at Rotterdam. The total cost amounted to 273,900 Guilders. The design of the ship was based on the Royal Netherlands Navy’s Watergeus. The ship departed from Brouwershaven to Japan under command of Captain J. Vroom with a crew of 42, after the test runs had been satisfactory.

On March 30, 1869, she arrived at Nagasaki, and was named Nisshin-maru (日進丸) by Saga Domain.

== Service under the Imperial Japanese Navy ==
Nisshin Maru was transferred from Saga Domain to the new Meiji government on June 22, 1870 and assigned to the newly formed Imperial Japanese Navy, as the Nisshin-kan. He was one of the ships assigned to the Taiwan Expedition of 1874.

In August 1875, he was assigned to visit all of the Chishima islands up to the Kamchatka Peninsula to formalize Japanese possession per the terms of the Treaty of Saint Petersburg. From February 26 to August 28, 1877, under the command of future Fleet Admiral Itō Sukeyuki, he participated in the suppression of the Satsuma Rebellion.

From July 31, 1882, under command of future admiral Tsuboi Kōzō Nisshin was assigned to patrols of the coast of Korea, as part of a show of strength by the Japanese government in response to the burning of the Japanese embassy in Seoul during the Imo Incident. He was reassigned to Korean patrols from February 28, 1884 after the Gapsin Coup.

On December 25, 1885, Nisshin was removed from combat status and was re-designated as training vessel. She was decommissioned on March 25, 1892 and scrapped in 1893.
