= James R. Wasson =

American recipient of Order of the Rising Sun

James Wasson
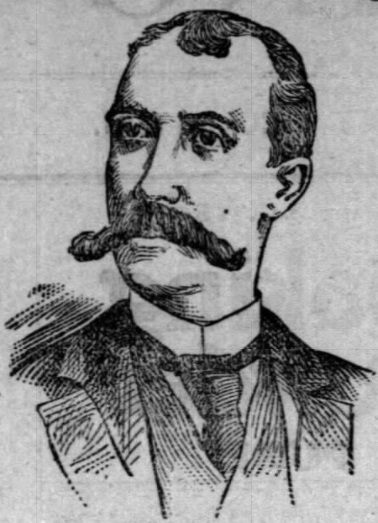
- The Evening Item (Richmond, Indiana), December 14, 1894
- Born: January 11, 1847; Harrison Township, Ohio, United States
- Died: February 17, 1923 (aged 76); Marshalltown, Iowa, United States
- Burial place: Hartford, Iowa, United States
- Military career
- Allegiance: United States (Empire of Japan) Japan
- Branch: United States Army (Empire of Japan) Imperial Japanese Army
- Service years: 1864-1865 (United States); 1874 (Japan); 1898 (United States)
- Rank: Major (USA); Colonel (Japan)
- Conflicts: American Civil War; Red River Campaign; Taiwan Expedition of 1874; Spanish–American War; Philippine Revolution
- Awards: Order of the Rising Sun

James Robert Wasson (11 January 1847 – 1923) was a U.S. Army officer hired by the Meiji government of the Empire of Japan as a foreign advisor and later as officer in the fledgling Imperial Japanese Army. He is noted as the first non-Japanese to be honored with the Order of the Rising Sun.

== Biography ==
Wasson was born in Ohio on January 11, 1847, and moved to Hartford, Iowa, in 1854. In 1864, during the American Civil War, he joined the Union Army by enlisting in the 34th Iowa Infantry Regiment, serving until being mustered out with the unit in August 1865. Two years later he became a cadet at the United States Military Academy at West Point. One of his classmates he befriended was Frederick D. Grant, son of President U.S. Grant, forming connections to both. Wasson graduated in 1871, ranking first in his class.

With President Grant's influence, Wasson went to Japan as a secretary of the American diplomatic legation. In the next year he, briefly returning to the United States, resigned his commission. Back in Japan he initially was a teacher and surveyor for a school of the Hokkaido Colonization Office, during which time he introduced and taught methods of triangulation to survey large areas. During the Taiwan Expedition of 1874 Wasson, who just had been commissioned as a colonel of engineers in the Imperial Japanese Army, accompanied General Saigō Tsugumichi as his chief of staff.

The New York Times reported that, in 1875, he was recognized by Emperor Meiji with "the decoration of the Rising Sun, of the Imperial Order of Meiji, a distinction no other foreigner ever enjoyed" as a consequence of his conduct during this military campaign. The order was the first national decoration awarded by the Japanese government. It is the second most prestigious Japanese decoration after the Order of the Chrysanthemum. A number of others have been traditionally known as the very first non-Japanese to be awarded the Order of the Rising Sun, including French-born Charles LeGendre, a naturalized American citizen since 1854, who was reported to have been awarded the Order of the Rising Sun in 1875.

In 1877, Wasson returned to the United States, and with the help of Grant was reappointed to the Army as a major in the Paymaster Department. By returning to the US Army, Wasson's annual earnings dropped to $2,500—a sharp decline from the $6,000 he earned as a colonel in the Japanese Army. He could no longer support the lifestyle which he had come accustomed while working in Japan and amassed gambling debts, eventually embezzling $24,000 by faking a robbery. However, Wasson's scam came to light and he was court-martialled. He was dismissed from the army and sentenced to 18 months imprisonment. He served his time in the Kansas State Penitentiary, eventually being pardoned by President Chester A. Arthur. He was thus released in November 1884, after 16 months of incarceration.

During the First Sino-Japanese War of 1894–1895, The New York Times reported a rumor that Wasson has again been called upon by the Japanese government to lead Japanese forces in combat after the Battle of Pyongyang, but the report was only a rumor.

Wasson later worked in insurance and various fields of engineering without ever gaining much success. Beside service in the Iowa National Guard Wasson, now in his 50s, joined the US Army for a third time; enlisting for the Spanish–American War. He served in the Philippines with the 46th U.S. Volunteer Infantry Regiment, and was promoted several times. Reaching the rank of color sergeant, he again was court-martialled and demoted to private. On the way back to the homeland, he met again his old friend Frederick D. Grant, who now was a brigadier general of volunteers. Wasson mustered out in early 1901.

Wasson worked and lived in various places and businesses, from mining in Mexico to engineering along the east coast. In 1917, the 70-year-old offered his services for World War I but was rejected. He spent his last years in the Iowa Veterans Home in Marshalltown, Iowa, dying on February 17, 1923. Wasson was buried back at Hartford, Iowa.
