= Fukuoka Takachika =

Japanese statesman

Junior First Rank Viscount Fukuoka Takachika
- 福岡 孝弟
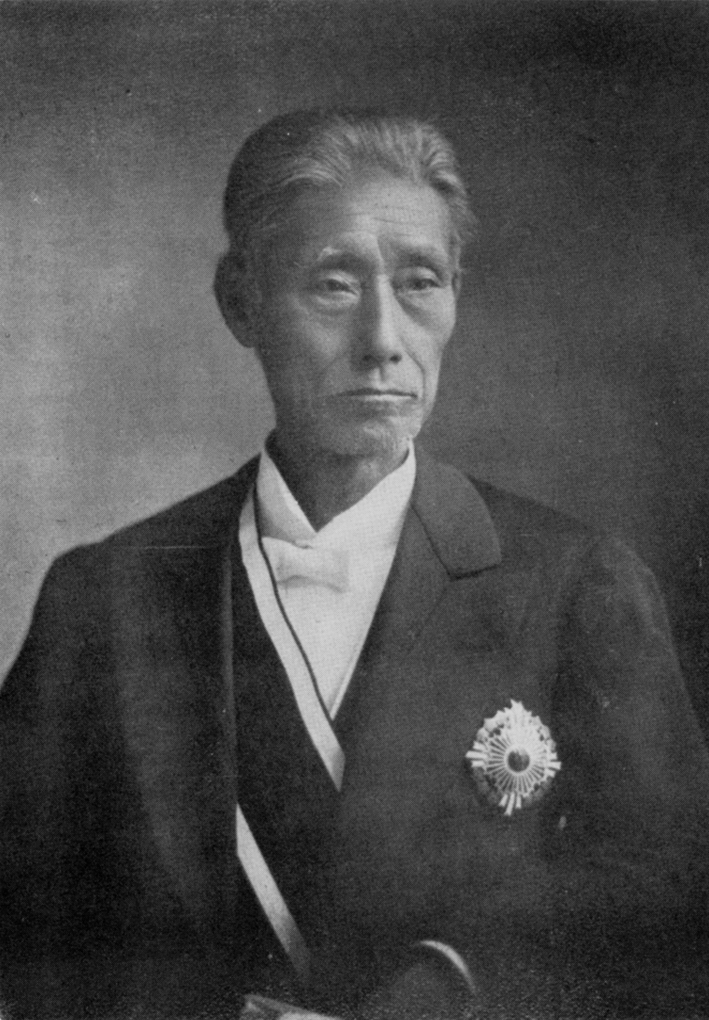

Minister of Education
- In office 7 April 1881 – 12 December 1883
- Monarch: Meiji
- Preceded by: Kōno Togama
- Succeeded by: Ōki Takatō

Member of the Privy Council
- In office 30 April 1888 – 7 March 1919
- Monarchs: Meiji; Taishō

Member of the Genrōin
- In office 14 May 1880 – 7 April 1881
- In office 25 April 1875 – 19 May 1875

Personal details
- Born: 5 February 1835 Tosa District, Tosa, Japan
- Died: 7 March 1919 (aged 84) Tokyo, Japan

Viscount Fukuoka Takachika (福岡 孝弟, Takachika Fukuoka; 5 February 1835 – 7 March 1919) was a Japanese statesman of the Meiji period.

== Early life ==
Fukuoka was born in Tosa District in present-day Kōchi Prefecture, and served the Yamauchi daimyō of Tosa as a domain official. Together with fellow Tosa samurai Gotō Shōjirō, he went to Kyoto in 1867 to convince shōgun Tokugawa Yoshinobu to return power peacefully to the Emperor, thus bringing about the Meiji Restoration.

== Meiji statesman ==
After the Meiji Restoration, while serving as a San'yo (senior councillor), he helped draft the text of the Charter Oath which set the tone and direction for the new Meiji government. In the new government, he concurrently served in a variety of offices, including Political system Affairs Officer and Parliament System Examination Officer. It was in this capacity that he was afterwards, asked to help draft the Seitaisho, which set up the organizational structure of the early Meiji government.

In 1870, Fukuoka was transferred back to Kōchi and focused on the reforms of domain's administration, just prior to the abolition of the han system.

In 1872, Fukuoka re-entered the central government as Taifu (Senior Vice Minister) of Education and of Justice, but resigned in 1873 due to his opposition to the government policy with regards to the Seikanron debate on the invasion of Korea.

In 1880, Fukuoka returned to the government as a member of the Genrōin and later served as Minister of Education, Sangi (Councillor), chairman of the Sanjiin (legislative advisory council).

He also served as Privy Councilor. In 1884, he was elevated to the rank of shishaku (viscount).
