= Yamagata Aritomo =

Japanese statesman and general (1838–1922)

Marshal Prince Yamagata Aritomo
- 山縣 有朋
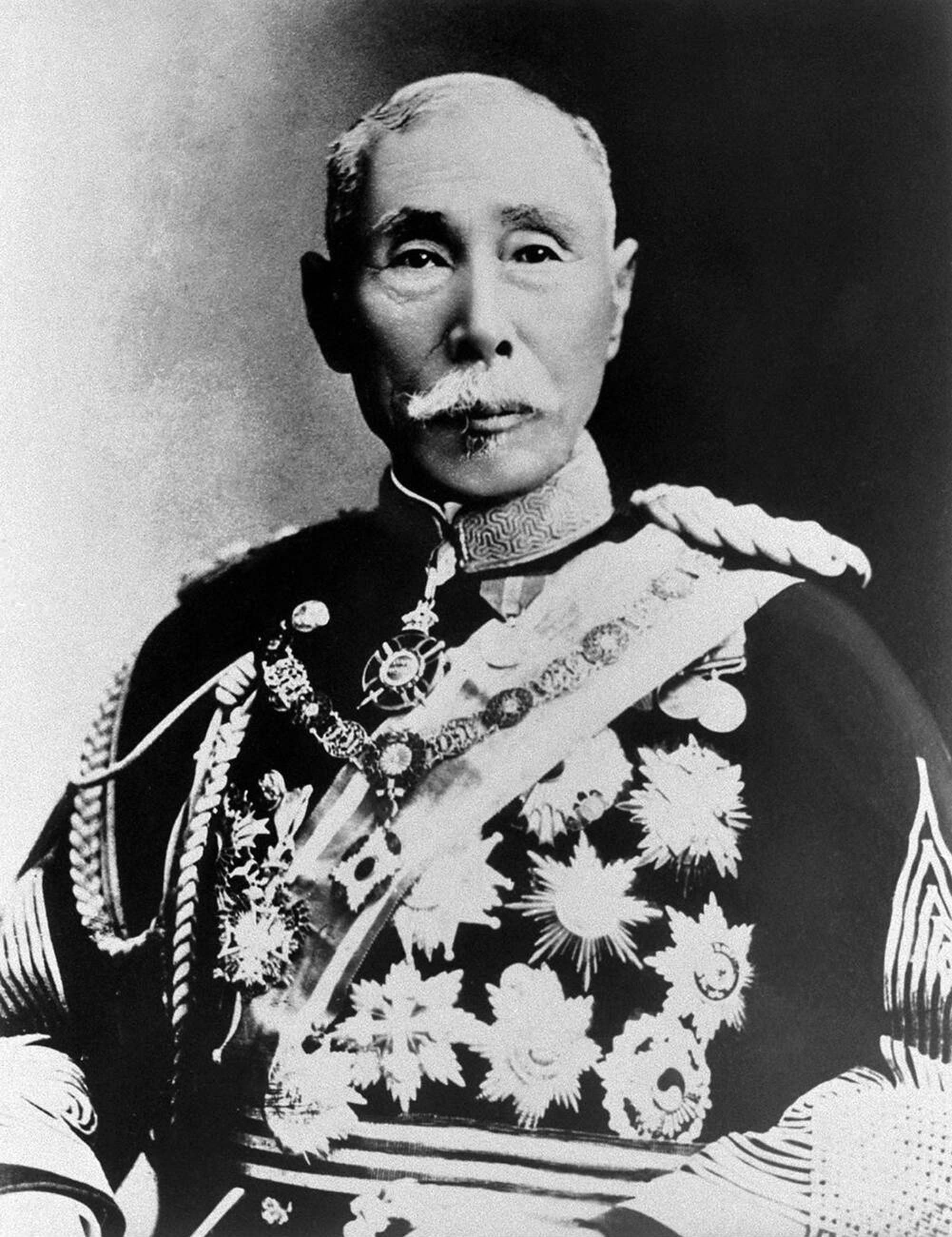

Prime Minister of Japan
- In office 8 November 1898 – 19 October 1900
- Monarch: Meiji
- Preceded by: Ōkuma Shigenobu
- Succeeded by: Itō Hirobumi
- In office 24 December 1889 – 6 May 1891
- Monarch: Meiji
- Preceded by: Kuroda Kiyotaka; Sanjō Sanetomi (acting)
- Succeeded by: Matsukata Masayoshi

President of the Privy Council
- In office 26 October 1909 – 1 February 1922
- Monarchs: Meiji; Taishō
- Vice President: Higashikuze Michitomi; Yoshikawa Akimasa; Kiyoura Keigo
- Preceded by: Itō Hirobumi
- Succeeded by: Kiyoura Keigo
- In office 21 December 1905 – 14 June 1909
- Monarch: Meiji
- Vice President: Higashikuze Michitomi
- Preceded by: Itō Hirobumi
- Succeeded by: Itō Hirobumi
- In office 11 March 1893 – 12 December 1893
- Monarch: Meiji
- Vice President: Higashikuze Michitomi
- Preceded by: Oki Takato
- Succeeded by: Kuroda Kiyotaka
Ministerial offices
Minister of Justice
In office 8 August 1892 – 11 March 1893
| Prime Minister | Itō Hirobumi |
| Preceded by | Kōno Togama |
| Succeeded by | Itō Hirobumi (acting); Yoshikawa Akimasa |
Minister of Home Affairs
In office 22 December 1885 – 17 May 1890
| Prime Minister | Itō Hirobumi; Kuroda Kiyotaka; Himself |
| Preceded by | Himself (as Lord of Home Affairs) |
| Succeeded by | Saigō Jūdō |
Lord of Home Affairs
In office 12 December 1883 – 22 December 1885
| Monarch | Meiji |
| Preceded by | Yamada Akiyoshi |
| Succeeded by | Himself (as Minister of Home Affairs) |
Lord of the Army
In office 30 June 1874 – 8 November 1878
| Monarch | Meiji |
| Preceded by | Izuru Tsuda |
| Succeeded by | Saigō Jūdō |
In office 8 June 1873 – 2 July 1873
| Monarch | Meiji |
| Preceded by | Office established |
| Succeeded by | Saigō Jūdō |

Member of the House of Peers
- In office 5 August 1895 – 1 February 1922

Personal details
- Born: 14 June 1838 Kawashima, Chōshū, Japan
- Died: 1 February 1922 (aged 83) Odawara, Kanagawa, Japan
- Party: Independent
- Spouse: Yamagata Tomoko (m. 1868; died 1893)
- Domestic partner: Yoshida Sadako (1893–1922)
- Children: Funakoshi Matsuko (daughter)
- Relatives: Yamagata Isaburō (nephew)

Military service
- Allegiance: Empire of Japan
- Branch/service: Imperial Japanese Army
- Years of service: 1868–1905
- Rank: Field Marshal
- Battles/wars: Boshin War; Battle of Aizu; Battle of Hatchōoki; Battle of Hokuetsu; Satsuma Rebellion; Siege of Kumamoto Castle; Battle of Tabaruzaka; Battle of Shiroyama; First Sino-Japanese War; Battle of Jiuliancheng; Battle of Pyongyang; Russo-Japanese War
- Awards: Order of the Golden Kite (1st class); Order of the Rising Sun (1st class with Paulownia Blossoms, Grand Cordon); Order of the Chrysanthemum; Member of the Order of Merit; Knight Grand Cross of the Order of St Michael and St George

Prince Yamagata Aritomo (Japanese: 山縣 有朋; 14 June 1838 – 1 February 1922) was a Japanese statesman and general who twice served as prime minister of Japan, in 1889–1891 and 1898–1900. He was a leading member of the genrō, a group of senior courtiers and statesmen who dominated the politics of Japan during the Meiji era. As the Imperial Japanese Army's inaugural Chief of Staff, he was the chief architect of its nationalist and reactionary ideology, which has led some historians to consider him the "father" of Japanese militarism.

Born to a low-ranking samurai family in the Chōshū Domain, Yamagata became a leader in the loyalist movement to overthrow the Tokugawa shogunate. As a commander in the Boshin War, he helped lead the military forces of the Satsuma–Chōshū Alliance to victory in the Meiji Restoration. Following the Restoration, he traveled to Europe to study Western military systems and returned to become the central figure in the creation of the modern Imperial Japanese Army, implementing a nationwide conscription system. He led the new conscript army to victory over the Satsuma Rebellion in 1877, which validated his military reforms and destroyed the last vestiges of the samurai class, including the right to bear swords. He further secured the army's independence from civilian control by creating an autonomous Imperial Army General Staff which reported directly to the Emperor of Japan.

Entering civilian government, Yamagata served as Home Minister, where he established an efficient, centralized police and local government system. As Prime Minister from 1889 to 1891, he oversaw the opening of the first Imperial Diet under the new Meiji Constitution. Thereafter, he engaged in a protracted political contest with Itō Hirobumi over the nature of constitutional government. Whereas Itō grew to favor a system of compromise with the political parties, Yamagata remained a staunch advocate of a "transcendental" government where the cabinet would be composed of non-partisan bureaucrats accountable only to the emperor. After the First Sino-Japanese War of 1894–1895, he served a second term as Prime Minister from 1898 to 1900, during which he passed laws to prevent political party members from holding key bureaucratic posts.

From the outset of the 1900s, Yamagata vied against Itō for supremacy among the Meiji oligarchy. Upon Ito's assassination on 26 October 1909, he consolidated power to become the dominant figure in the Emperor's court. However, a political scandal that involved his meddling in Crown Prince Hirohito's engagement led to him losing power shortly before his death in February 1922.

== Early life ==
Yamagata Aritomo, first named Tatsunosuke, was born on 14 June 1838, in the castle town of Hagi, the capital of the Chōshū Domain (present-day Yamaguchi Prefecture). His father, Yamagata Arinori, was a low-ranking samurai of the chūgen (foot soldier) class, the lowest rank of direct vassals to the daimyō. The family was poor, and their duties were barely distinguishable from those of commoners, but they retained the privileges of the samurai class. Yamagata's mother died when he was five, and he was raised by his grandmother, Katsu, who instilled in him the ideals of the samurai. Under his father's tutelage, he was schooled in the classical literature of China and Japan and developed a talent for writing poetry. He also received military training in fencing, spearmanship, and jujitsu.

From the age of thirteen, Yamagata held a series of minor jobs in the han bureaucracy, first as an errand boy in the treasury office and later as a servant in the han school. He eventually became an informer in the han police organization, where his faithful service brought him to the attention of his superiors. Yamagata grew up during a period of major reform in Chōshū. Stung by its defeat at the Battle of Sekigahara in 1600, the domain nurtured a tradition of hostility toward the Tokugawa shogunate. In the 1830s, under the leadership of Daimyō Mōri Takachika, Chōshū underwent significant economic and military reforms, strengthening its finances and adopting Western military technology. This atmosphere of change and innovation influenced Yamagata, making him aware of the benefits of modernization.

== Revolutionary loyalist ==
=== Early political activity ===
In 1858, at the age of twenty, Yamagata was selected to go to Kyoto, the imperial capital, to serve as an intelligence agent for the domain. His selection was recommended by Yoshida Shōin, an influential Chōshū intellectual whose teachings were inspiring a new generation of loyalist activists. This was a turning point in Yamagata's career, moving him from the confines of han administration into the turbulent national politics of the bakumatsu period. The arrival of Commodore Perry in 1853 had shattered Japan's seclusion policy and exposed the weakness of the Tokugawa shogunate. A growing movement known as sonnō jōi (尊皇攘夷, Revere the Emperor, Expel the Barbarian) emerged, calling for the restoration of the emperor's political power and the expulsion of foreigners.

In Kyoto, Yamagata became associated with a group of radical sonnō jōi activists and was introduced to the loyalist scholars Yanagawa Seigan and Umeda Umpin. These men were at the center of the anti-bakufu movement in Kyoto, and their ideas, combined with the political events Yamagata witnessed, persuaded him that drastic measures were needed to restore imperial rule and resist the West. Upon his return to Hagi in October 1858, he began nearly six months of study under Yoshida Shōin at his private academy, the Shōka Sonjuku (松下村塾, school beneath the pines).

Following Yoshida's execution by the shogunate in 1859, Yamagata became a central figure among the young, radical Chōshū loyalists. He participated in the Shimonoseki campaign and was wounded during the bombardment of Shimonoseki by a multinational Western fleet in 1864, an experience that convinced him of the overwhelming superiority of Western military technology. When a conservative faction in the Chōshū government made peace with the shogunate, Yamagata and other radicals launched an internal coup known as the "Chōshū Restoration". In February 1865, he led a force in the decisive battle at Edo-Ota, which secured victory for the radical faction and committed Chōshū to a policy of overthrowing the Tokugawa bakufu. Under new leadership, Chōshū entered into the secret Satsuma–Chōshū Alliance with the rival Satsuma Domain.

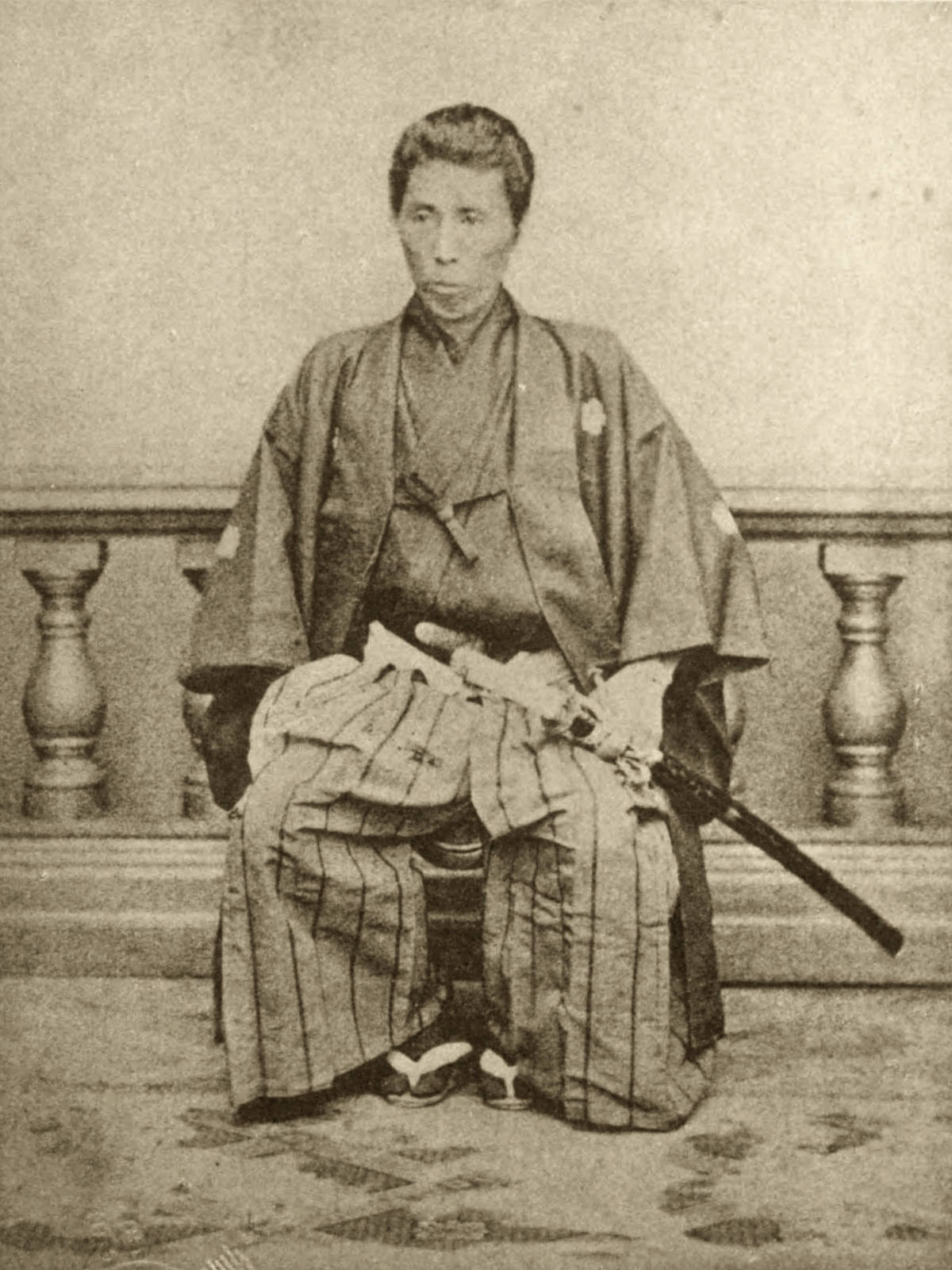
Yamagata in 1869

Following the defeat at Shimonoseki, Yamagata had become an officer in the Kiheitai (奇兵隊; lit. "Irregular Unit"), an innovative militia unit organized by Takasugi Shinsaku. Unlike traditional samurai units, the Kiheitai was composed of men from all social classes, including commoners. Yamagata's experience in the Kiheitai persuaded him of the fighting potential of well-trained, well-equipped commoner soldiers, a lesson he would later apply to the entire nation. He distinguished himself as a military commander during the Second Chōshū expedition in 1866, leading kiheitai units in amphibious raids across the Shimonoseki Strait. Takasugi's premature death in 1867 was a major loss for the loyalist movement; though Yamagata was a talented officer, Takasugi passed over him for command of the Kiheitai, selecting Ōmura Masujirō for the role as Ōmura had greater technical and tactical expertise and was seen as less ideological.

Yamagata played a key role in the subsequent Boshin War of 1868, leading Chōshū forces in the campaigns in northern Japan that culminated in the overthrow of the shogunate and the Meiji Restoration. His command during the war, however, was marked by occasional setbacks; in one campaign on the western coast, his forces stalled and he failed to cut off the retreating shogunate army.

== Founding the Imperial Japanese Army ==
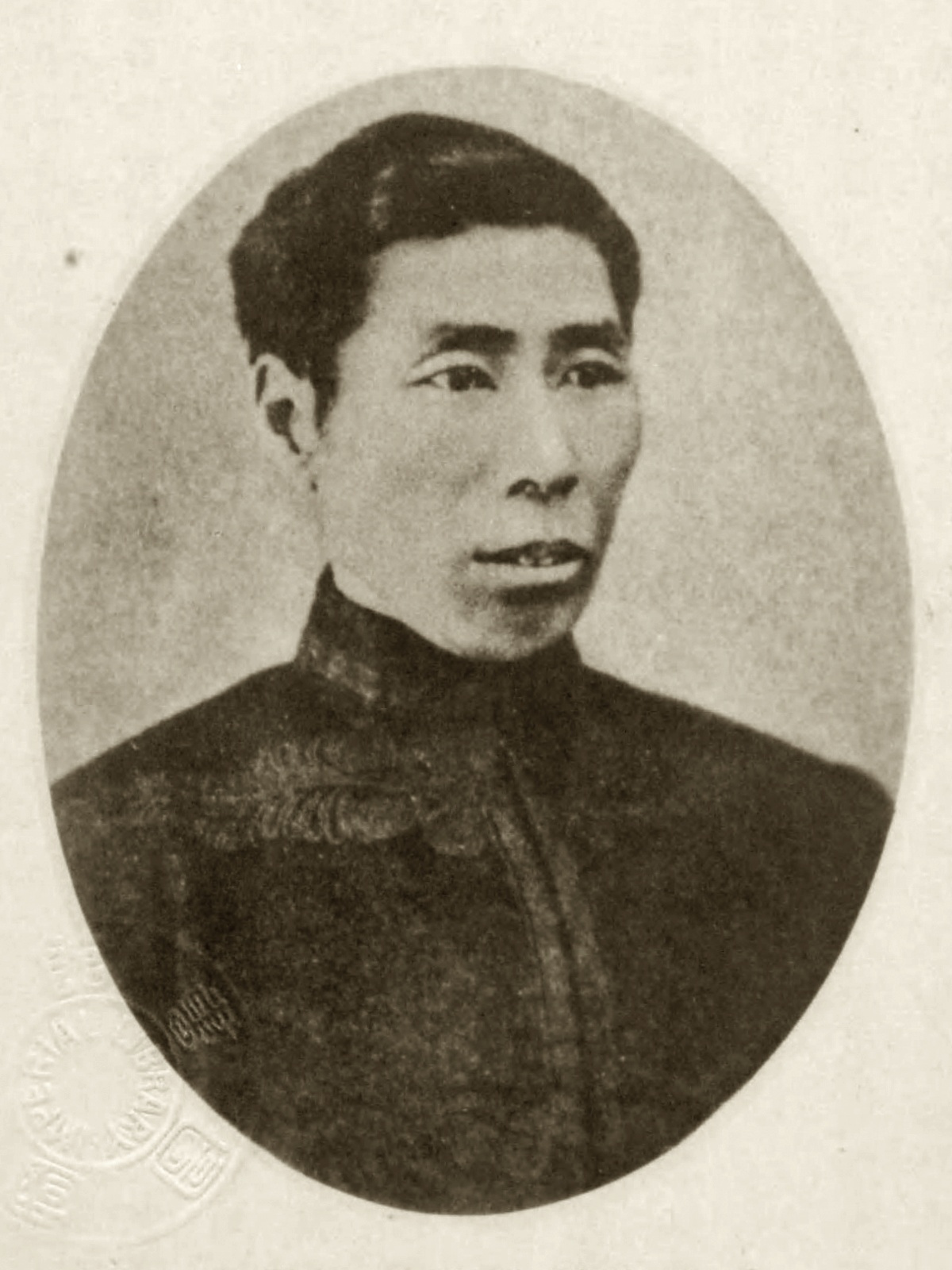
Yamagata in the 1870s

Yamagata Aritomo was a central figure in creating the new military foundations of the Meiji state. From 1869 to 1870, he and Saigō Tsugumichi undertook a tour of Europe to study Western military systems. Yamagata was deeply impressed by the Prussian military, particularly its use of universal conscription, which he saw as the key to creating a modern, powerful army. Upon his return, he was appointed Assistant Vice Minister of Military Affairs and set about organizing a national army. He was instrumental in establishing the Imperial Bodyguard (Goshimpei (御親兵)), the first military unit under the direct command of the central government, composed of troops from Satsuma, Chōshū, and Tosa. This force provided the military backing for the abolition of the feudal domains in 1871, a crucial step in the centralization of political power.

=== Conscription and the Satsuma Rebellion ===
Yamagata's most significant contribution was the establishment of a nationwide conscription system. He was the primary driver behind the Conscription Act of 1872, which made military service compulsory for all male citizens, regardless of social class. He saw the policy as a multi-faceted tool: it would create a modern, powerful army based on the Prussian model he admired, but it would also curtail the power of the samurai class and instill a new sense of national identity and loyalty to the emperor and the state. Convinced of the merit of peasant soldiers from his command of mixed commoner-samurai units during the Restoration, he also viewed conscription as a way of educating future generations in citizenship. The policy faced strong opposition, both from peasants who resented the "blood tax" and from samurai who saw it as a violation of their traditional status. As Army Minister from 1873, Yamagata vigorously suppressed this opposition.

During the Satsuma Rebellion of 1877, led by the celebrated Restoration hero Saigō Takamori, Yamagata served as field commander of the government forces. He had initially proposed an amphibious assault to strike at the rebellion's base in Kagoshima, but the government rejected his plan in favor of a direct relief of the besieged Kumamoto Castle. Leading a cautious and methodical campaign, Yamagata's conscript army ultimately crushed the rebellion in a decisive victory. When the emperor visited the wounded after the rebellion, Yamagata was among the dignitaries present. Observing the emperor touch the scars of the maimed soldiers, Yamagata "stood erect and saluted, at which everyone wept". The victory validated the conscription system and ended the last major challenge to the authority of the Meiji government. Despite the military triumph, Yamagata expressed deep personal sorrow over the death of his former comrade Saigō.

=== Creation of the General Staff ===
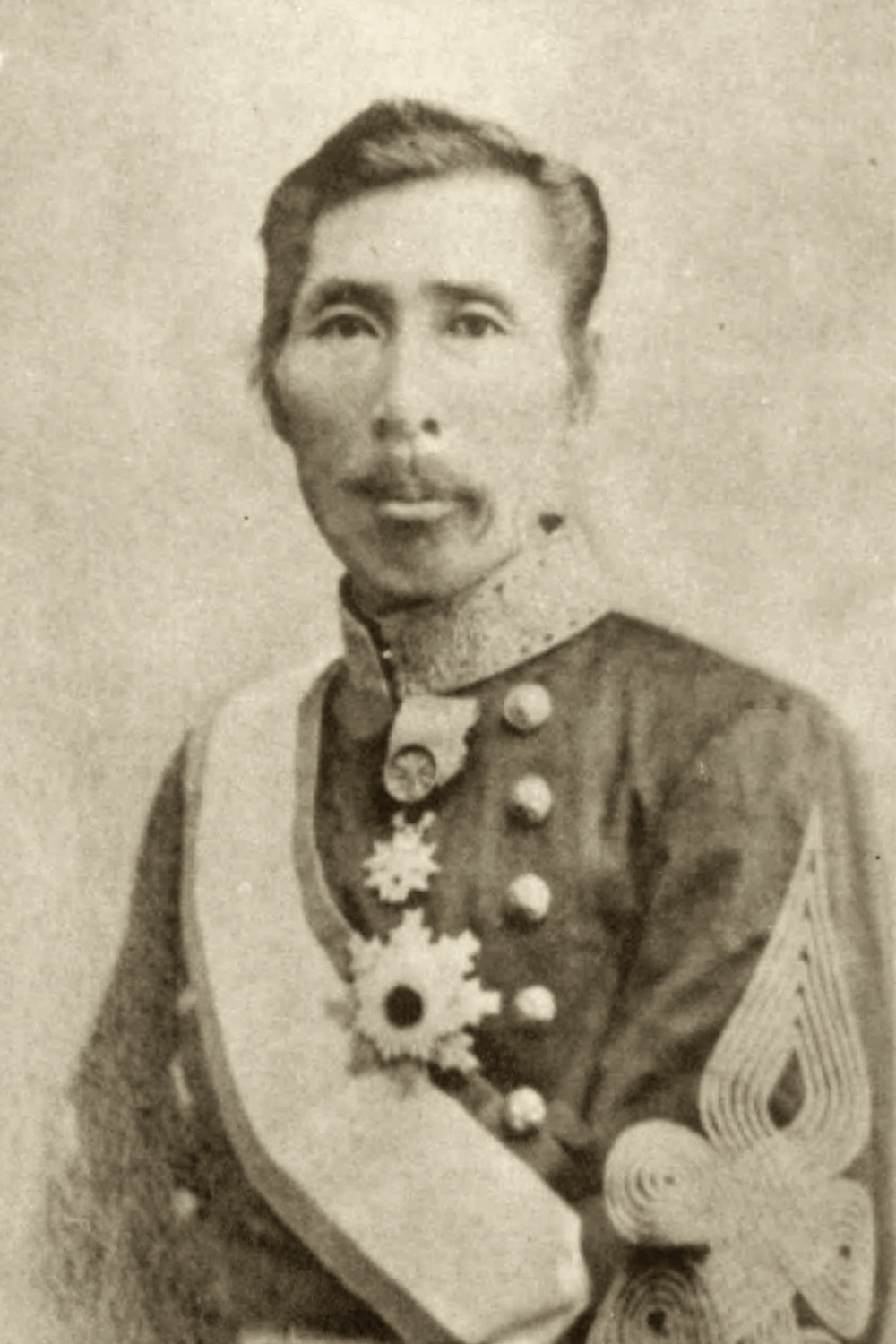
Yamagata in 1880

Following the Satsuma Rebellion, Yamagata worked to further professionalize and depoliticize the army. In reaction to the rebelliousness of soldiers who had joined Saigō, and to address grievances that had led to the Takebashi Mutiny of 1878, he issued the "Admonition to Soldiers" (gunjin kunkai), prepared for him by the scholar-official Nishi Amane, which stressed strict discipline and forbade soldiers from petitioning or questioning state policies. He reorganized the military along German lines and, in 1878, with the advice of his subordinate Katsura Tarō, established an independent Imperial Japanese Army General Staff, modeled on the Prussian system. This new body was responsible for military planning and command and reported directly to the emperor, not to the civilian government. This effectively separated military command from political administration, ensuring the army's autonomy from civilian control and becoming a major source of the military's political power in the following decades.

To instill a uniform ideology in the new army, Yamagata was the principal force behind the Imperial Rescript to Soldiers and Sailors of 1882. This document, which he promulgated as a more far-reaching response to the growing influence of the Freedom and People's Rights Movement, served as the ethical code for all military personnel until the end of World War II. It emphasized absolute personal loyalty to the emperor as the soldier's highest duty, running counter to the democratic assertions of the movement, and strictly forbade any involvement in politics. It also shaped the nationalist and reactionary ideological development of the army.

== Political career ==
Yamagata's influence was not confined to the military; his career included service as Home Minister, Prime Minister, Minister of Justice, and President of the Privy Council. In 1883, he was appointed Home Minister and embarked on a major reform of the state's internal administration. Using German models and with the assistance of the German advisor Albert Mosse, he established a new local government system that centralized authority and extended the reach of the central government down to the village level. He also reformed the police system, creating a powerful, centralized force under the firm control of the Home Ministry. A staunch conservative, Yamagata viewed the growing Freedom and People's Rights Movement with alarm and used his position as Home Minister to suppress political opposition, culminating in the harsh Peace Preservation Law of 1887, which gave the police broad powers to quell dissent.

=== First premiership ===
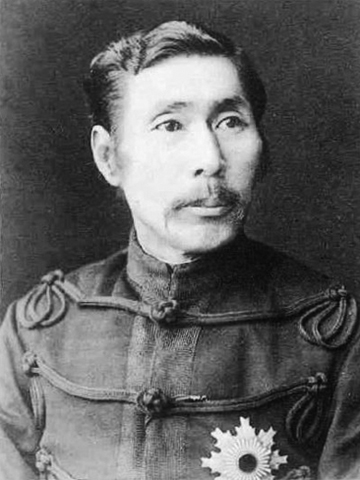
Yamagata in 1887

In December 1889, Yamagata became the third Prime Minister of Japan, heading a new cabinet after the resignation of Kuroda Kiyotaka. His government oversaw the opening of the first Imperial Diet in 1890, an event that marked a new phase in Japanese politics. In a speech before the Diet in March 1890, he articulated for the first time his strategic concept of national security. He defined a "line of sovereignty" (主権線, shukensen; the nation's borders) and a "line of interest" (利益線, riekisen; a buffer zone of strategic interest, specifically Korea, essential to the defense of the line of sovereignty). This doctrine guided Japanese foreign policy for decades and was used to justify military expansion on the Asian continent.

Yamagata immediately clashed with the opposition parties in the Diet over the budget, particularly his demands for increased military spending. A former military man, Yamagata was reluctant to yield ground and had little inclination to cultivate the sort of contacts with politicians that might have forestalled the conflict. The confrontation became deadlocked, and Yamagata considered dissolving the Diet, but was dissuaded by his rival Itō Hirobumi. On 10 February 1891, he delivered a speech declaring that his cabinet could not answer questions on certain budget items, which was harshly criticized by Itō as a "foolish statement" that needlessly antagonized the opposition. He eventually secured a compromise by working with a splinter faction of the Liberal Party, though the final budget incorporated almost three-quarters of the cuts the opposition had demanded. To forestall coalitions between opposition parties in future sessions, Yamagata revised the Regulations for Public Meetings and Political Associations, forbidding any party from combining or communicating with another. During this period, he was also a key figure behind the promulgation of the Imperial Rescript on Education (1890), which established a conservative, emperor-centered moral framework for the national education system. He resigned as Prime Minister in May 1891, his government having survived the first Diet session but weakened by Itō's criticism.

=== Second premiership ===
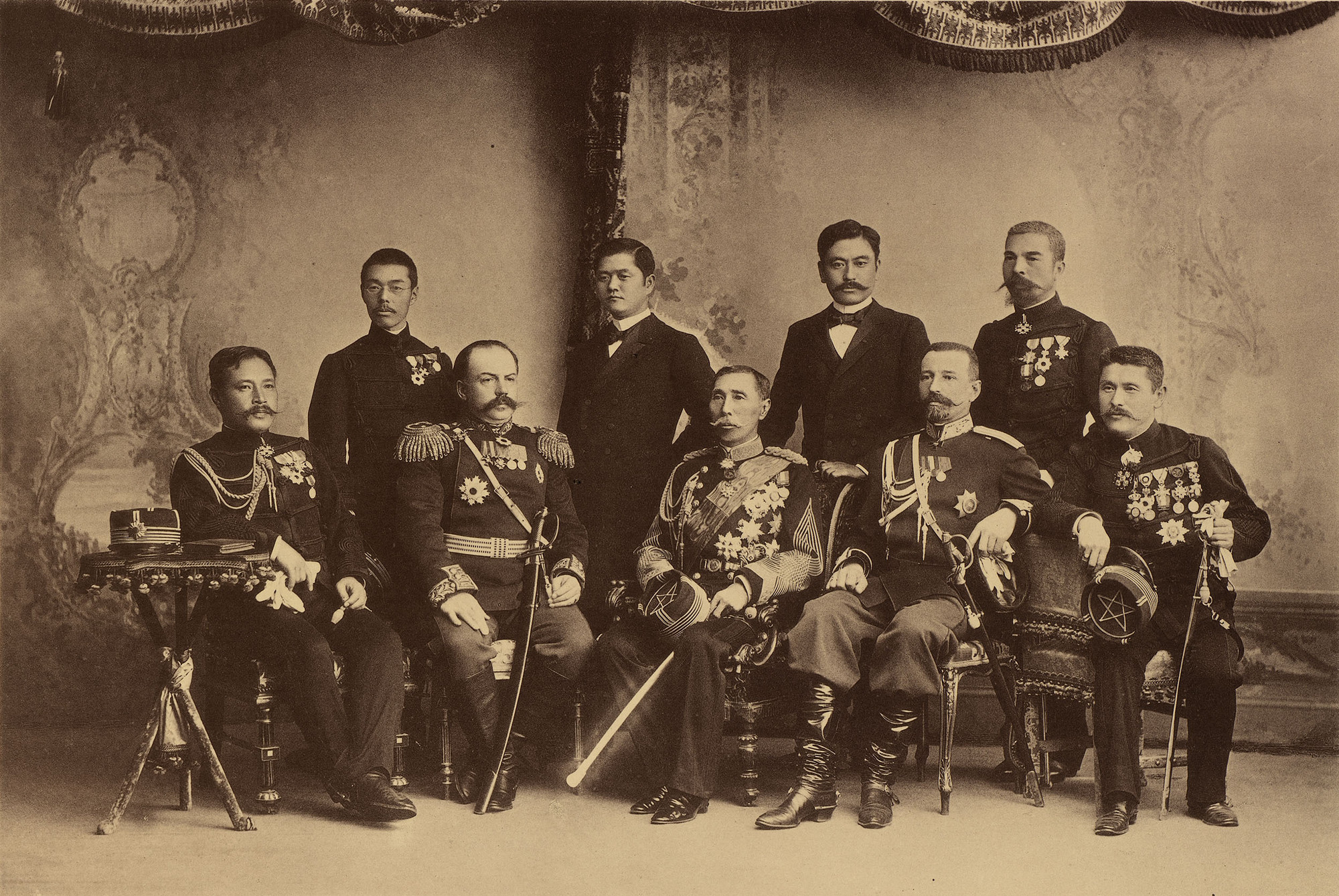
Japanese mission attending the coronation of Nicholas II, 1896. Yamagata is seated in the center.

Yamagata's political influence continued to grow throughout the 1890s. During the First Sino-Japanese War (1894–1895), against the better judgment of the government, he successfully insisted on being appointed commander of the First Army. He arrived at the front in September, after the capture of Pyongyang, but a bout of illness cut short his command. While convalescing, he remained at the front and, frustrated with the Imperial General Headquarters' operational guidance, unilaterally ordered his army to pursue the Chinese forces, an act of insubordination that created friction with the central command. In December, the emperor had to personally order his return to Japan. After the war, he used the victory to push for a massive expansion of the army, doubling its size from seven to thirteen divisions. He argued for "bigger, not more" divisions, focusing on increasing the infantry strength of the existing formations rather than creating new ones.

In November 1898, Yamagata formed his second cabinet following the collapse of the short-lived Ōkuma Shigenobu–Itagaki Taisuke party cabinet. His primary objective was to secure funding for the postwar military expansion and address the growing fiscal deficit, which required a significant increase in the land tax. To overcome opposition in the Diet, he formed an unprecedented alliance with Itagaki's Kenseitō, the successor to the Liberal Party, promising them concessions on other policies in exchange for their support on the tax bill. After successfully passing the tax increase, however, Yamagata moved to undermine the political parties' influence. In March 1899, he enacted a series of civil service ordinances that made it difficult for party members to be appointed to high positions in the bureaucracy, effectively insulating it from political control. During this period, his government also passed the 1900 Peace Police Law to suppress the labor movement. In May 1900, he revised the regulations for service ministers, stipulating that only active-duty generals and admirals could serve as ministers of the army and navy, giving the military a powerful veto over the formation of any cabinet. He resigned in October 1900, having secured the army's long-term expansion and strengthened the foundations of bureaucratic rule, and after the Boxer Rebellion had been suppressed.

== Elder statesman (genrō) ==
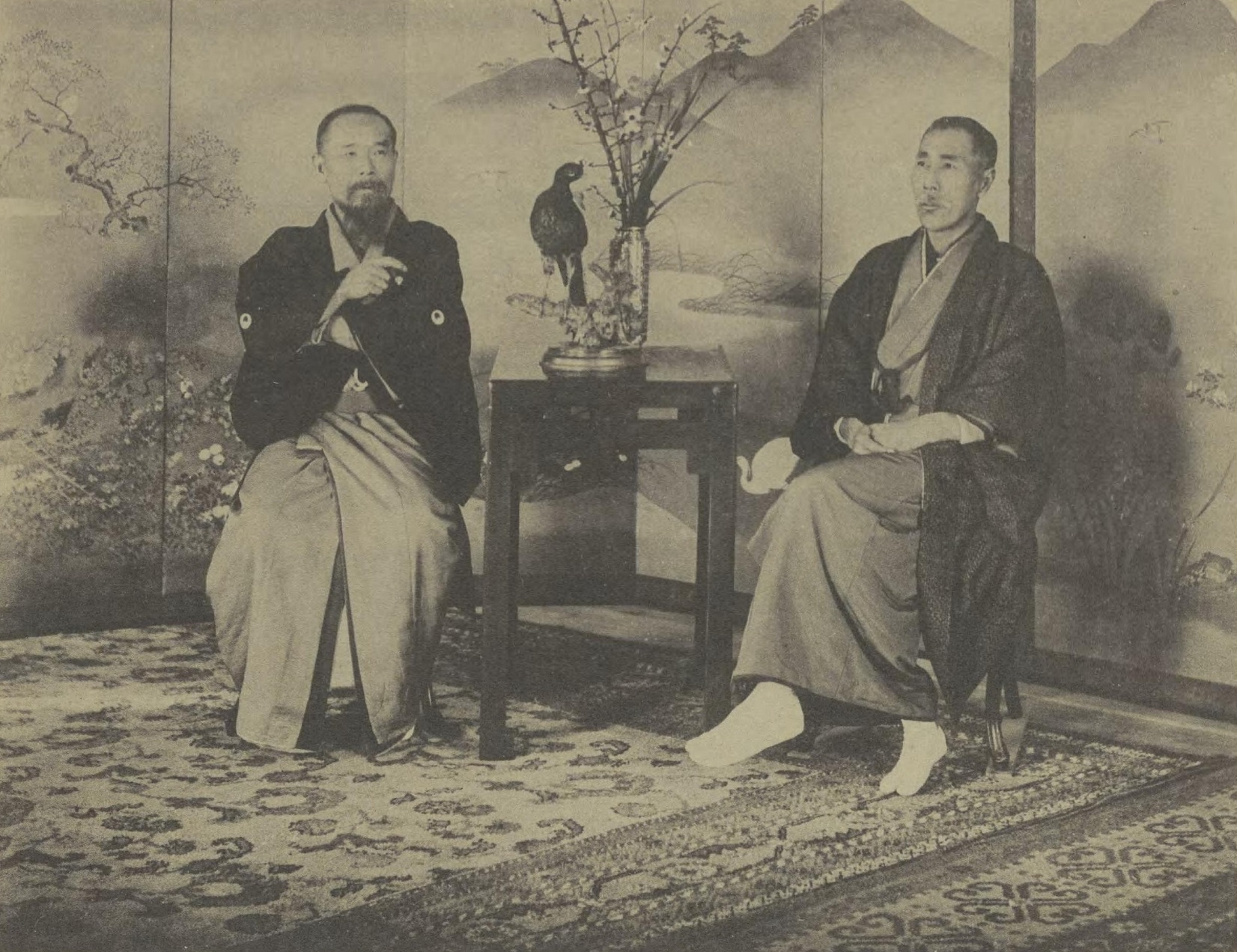
Yamagata (right) with Itō Hirobumi, 1896

After 1900, Yamagata retired from direct participation in cabinet government, but he continued to exercise influence as a member of the genrō (元老), an unofficial group of elder statesmen who advised the emperor and selected Japan's prime ministers. He became the central figure in a long-standing political rivalry with Itō Hirobumi. This rivalry split the oligarchy into two major factions: a "militarist" faction led by Yamagata, and a "civil" faction led by Itō. Throughout 1900 to 1909, Yamagata vied against Itō for control of Japanese policy while exercising influence through his protégé, Katsura Tarō. While both men were conservatives, Yamagata championed bureaucratic, non-party government, whereas Itō, believing cooperation with the parties was necessary, formed his own party, the Rikken Seiyūkai, in 1900. In 1903, Yamagata and Katsura engineered Itō's removal from party leadership by having him appointed President of the Privy Council. Upon Itō's death in 1909, Yamagata successfully consolidated power as the highest authority in the imperial regime below the Emperor himself.

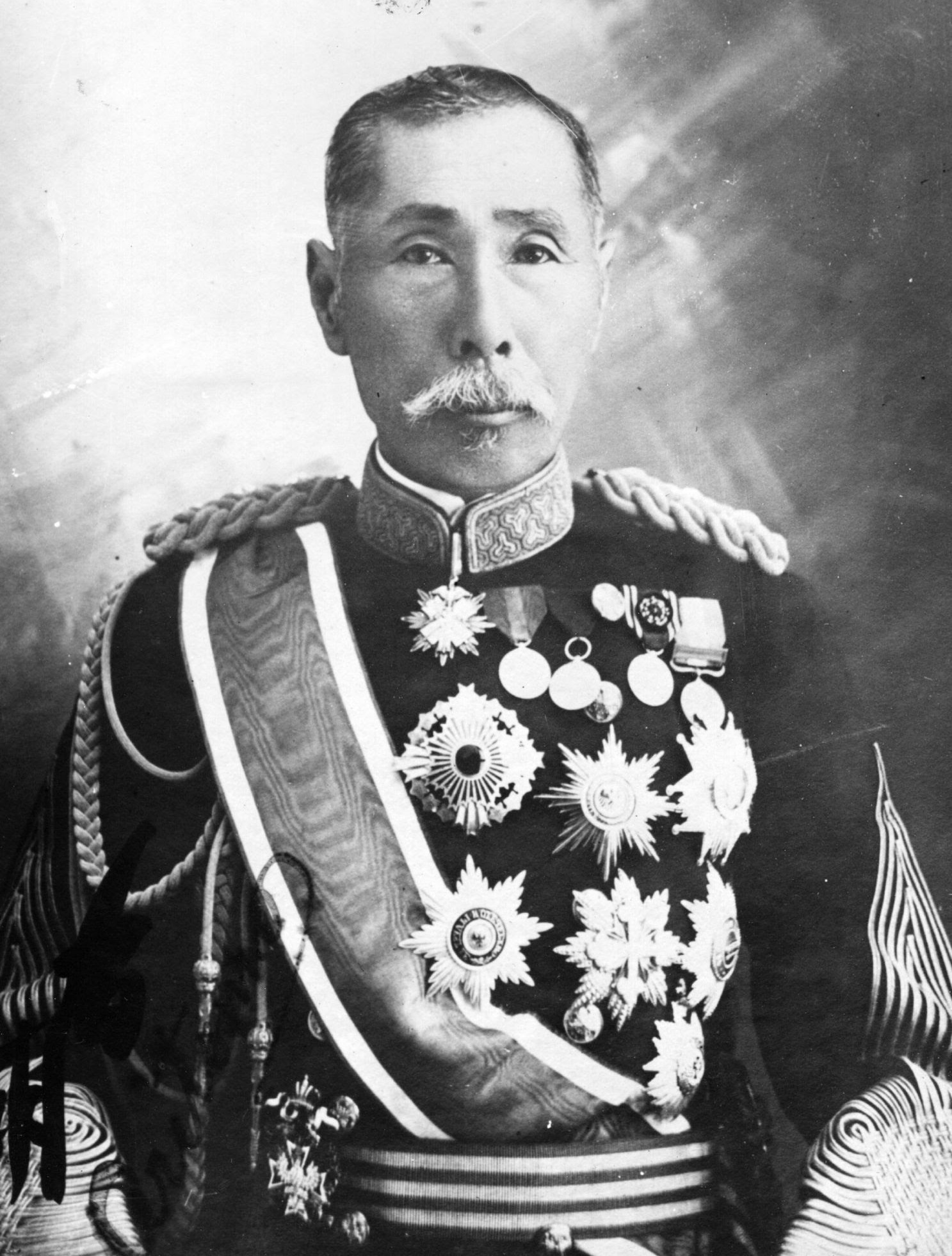
Aritomo during the Russo-Japanese War

Yamagata was a central figure in Japan's foreign policy during this period. As a check against Russian expansionism, he was a strong proponent of the Anglo-Japanese Alliance in 1902. During the Russo-Japanese War (1904–1905), he was the final authority on military strategy as Chief of the Army General Staff. Believing Japan's resources were overextended, he successfully argued for an end to the war after the victory at Mukden, against the wishes of some field commanders who wanted to press on. After the war, convinced that Russia would seek revenge, he pushed for another massive expansion of the army, calling for a force of fifty divisions. He was a key architect of the 1907 Imperial Defense Policy, which established Russia as the army's primary hypothetical opponent and codified a forward-based, offensive strategy on the Asian continent. Invoking the military's prerogative of supreme command, he ensured that the plan was drafted with no input from civilian leaders. He was also a key force behind the annexation of Korea in 1910.

Yamagata's authority was seriously challenged after the death of Emperor Meiji in July 1912. He had his protégé Katsura elevated to the powerful court positions of Grand Chamberlain and Lord Keeper of the Privy Seal. Yamagata intended for Katsura to guide the new, inexperienced Emperor Taishō, but he was also motivated by a growing distrust of Katsura's own political ambitions; their personal relationship had cooled, and the appointment was a way to remove Katsura from the political arena. However, during the Taishō Political Crisis of 1912–1913, his support for the army's demand for two new divisions led to the resignation of the Seiyūkai cabinet of Saionji Kinmochi. He then orchestrated the appointment of Katsura as Prime Minister. This move, however, sparked a nationwide popular uprising that forced Katsura's resignation and temporarily undermined the power of the genrō and the military. The crisis also led to the reversal of Yamagata's 1900 ordinance requiring active-duty officers as service ministers.

During World War I, Yamagata's influence remained decisive. He supported Japan's entry into the war but was critical of Foreign Minister Katō Takaaki's handling of the Twenty-One Demands to China in 1915, fearing it would alienate the Western powers. Yamagata led the other genrō in forcing Katō to moderate the demands, demonstrating the elders' continuing power over foreign policy. Driven by a long-held fear of international racial conflict, he also engineered the secret Russo-Japanese Alliance of 1916 to secure Japan's position against the Western allies after the war.

== Final years and death ==
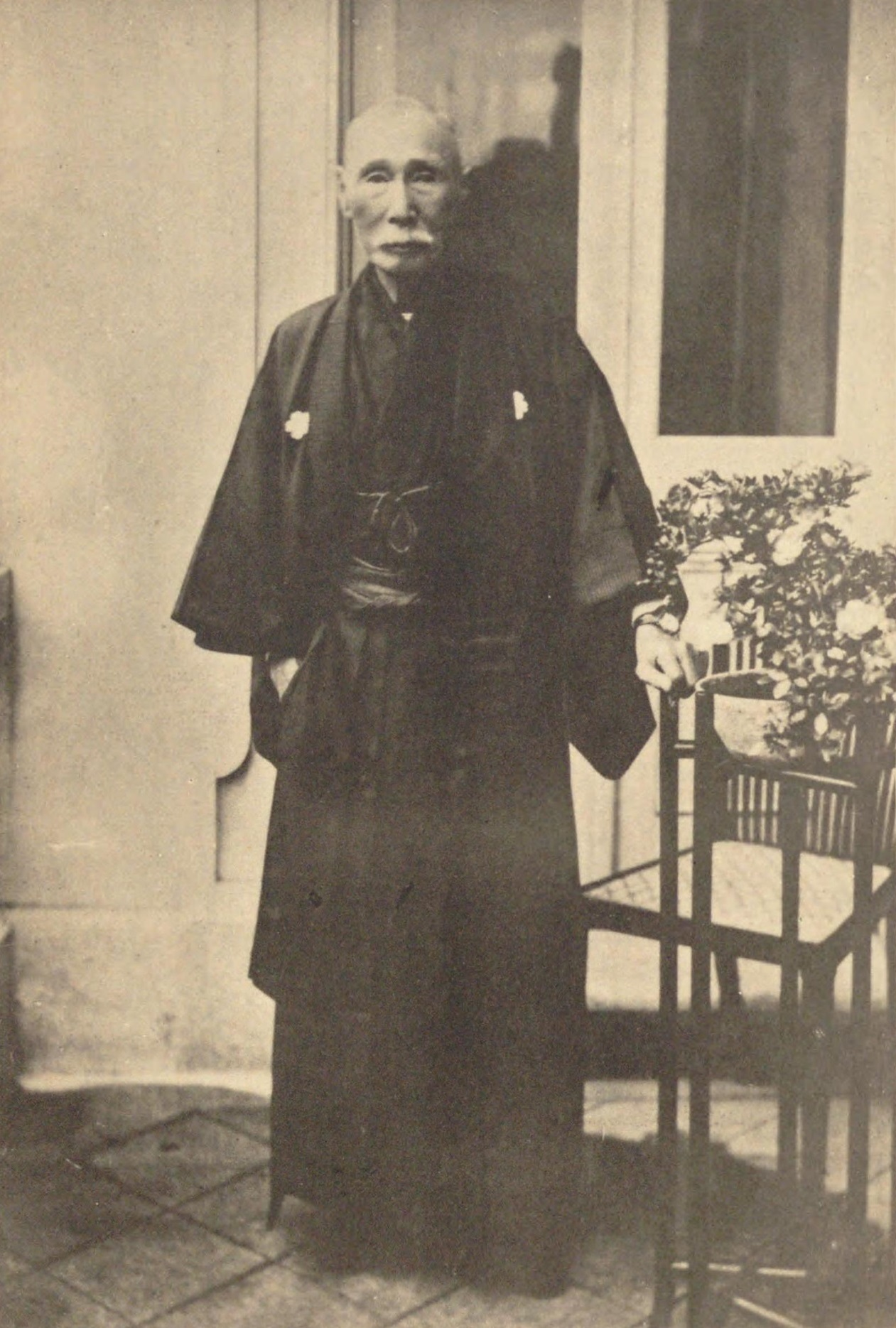
Yamagata on his 83rd birthday in 1921, at his New Chinzansō villa in Tokyo

In his final years, Yamagata remained the "power behind the curtain". He was a central, though initially reluctant, figure in the decision to undertake the Siberian Intervention in 1918. In the same year, after the 1918 rice riots, he was forced to accept the appointment of Hara Takashi as Prime Minister. Yamagata had initially hoped to avoid a pure party cabinet by persuading Saionji to head a cabinet of national unity. However, when Saionji refused and joined outgoing premier Terauchi Masatake in recommending Hara, Yamagata conceded to Hara becoming Prime Minister. Unwilling to recommend a party politician himself, he entrusted the duty to Saionji, paving the way for the first party cabinet in Japanese history, a landmark in Japanese constitutional history. Though he distrusted party politics, he developed a working relationship with Hara, whom he respected for his conservative pragmatism. By 1921, Yamagata had come to appreciate that Hara's cabinet was providing better coordination of government than any of its predecessors.

His final major political involvement was the "grave court affair" of 1920–1921 concerning the marriage of Crown Prince Hirohito. Yamagata attempted to block the marriage, citing hereditary color blindness in the family of the bride (Princess Nagako), the Shimazu clan of Satsuma. His effort was widely seen as an attack on Satsuma and was ultimately defeated by a coalition of court nobles and his political opponents, a major blow to his prestige. Saddened by this defeat and the assassination of Prime Minister Hara in November 1921, an event he lamented, Yamagata's health declined. He died on 1 February 1922, at his villa in Odawara. He was given a state funeral and buried at the Gokokuji temple in Tokyo.

== Personal life ==
Yamagata was a man of contrasts. In public, he was a stern, disciplined, and often ruthless military leader and politician. He disliked publicity and was not an able public speaker, preferring to exert his influence from behind the scenes. In his private life, however, he was a man of refined tastes. He was a prolific writer of classical poetry, which he used to express his emotions, even in the heat of battle. He was also a master of landscape gardening, and his villas, including the Murinan in Kyoto and the Kokinan in Odawara, were famous for their beautifully designed gardens.

In 1867, he married Yamagata Yūko. They had seven children, but only one daughter survived to adulthood. After his wife's death in 1893, he remained a widower. He adopted his nephew, Yamagata Isaburō, as his heir.

== Legacy ==
Yamagata Aritomo was one of the most important and controversial figures in the history of modern Japan. For over half a century, his influence was a major factor in nearly every significant development, from the creation of the modern army to the conduct of foreign policy. His career was one of extraordinary success, rising from an insignificant samurai to become the nation's most powerful military and political leader. He was the architect of the modern Japanese army and the modern Japanese bureaucracy, both of which he molded in his own conservative, authoritarian image. Personally stern, private, and silent, his dour and methodical plans for the nation contrasted with the more casual and breezy approach of his rival Itō Hirobumi.

His political philosophy, which championed a strong, centralized state led by a non-partisan bureaucracy and military, set the pattern for Japanese government for decades and obstructed the development of a more liberal, democratic order. While he consistently adhered to the principle of non-party cabinets, he was also a realist who compromised with political parties when necessary to achieve national goals, most notably during his second premiership. Nevertheless, his actions based on his conservative beliefs, taken within the constitutional framework he had helped create, made it inevitable that the parties would expand their political influence, making him an unintended benefactor in the development of constitutional government in Japan.

His legacy is deeply contested. In the West and in postwar Japan, he has often been depicted as the "arch-villain" of Japanese militarism and reaction, the primary force that led Japan down the path to aggressive war and defeat in 1945. Others have argued that Yamagata, while an authoritarian, was also a cautious and pragmatic statesman whose primary goal was ensuring Japan's national security in a hostile world. His life was characterized by a deep and unwavering loyalty to the emperor and the nation, and his actions, however harsh, were consistently aimed at building a strong, independent Japan capable of standing among the great powers. In this, he was spectacularly successful. His life and career are inseparable from the story of Japan's phenomenal transformation into a modern state.

== Awards ==
=== Japanese ===
==== Peerages in the Kazoku and other titles ====
- Count (7 July 1884)
- Genrō (6 May 1891)
- Marquis (5 August 1895)
- Gensui (20 January 1898)
- Prince (21 September 1907)

==== Decorations ====
- Grand Cordon of the Order of the Rising Sun, 2 November 1877
- Grand Cordon of the Order of the Rising Sun, with Paulownia Blossoms, 5 August 1895
- Grand Cordon of the Order of the Chrysanthemum, 3 June 1902; Collar, 1 April 1906
- Order of the Golden Kite, 2nd Class, 5 August 1895; 1st Class, 1 April 1906

==== Order of precedence ====
- Fifth Rank, August 1870
- Fourth Rank, December 1872
- Third Rank, December 1884
- Second Rank, October 1886
- Senior Second Rank, 20 December 1895
- Junior First Rank, 1 February 1922 (posthumous)

=== Foreign ===
- German Empire:
  - Knight of the Royal Order of the Crown, 1st Class, 22 December 1886
  - Grand Cross of the Order of the Red Eagle, 14 June 1899
- Kingdom of Portugal: Grand Cross of the Royal Military Order of Our Lord Jesus Christ, 25 August 1887
- Kingdom of Italy: Grand Cross of the Order of Saints Maurice and Lazarus, 30 October 1889
- (Austrian Empire) (Kingdom of Hungary) Austria-Hungary: Knight of the Order of the Iron Crown, 1st Class, 22 November 1890
- France: Grand Cross of the Legion of Honour, 7 May 1897
- United Kingdom:
  - Honorary Member of the Order of Merit, with Swords, 21 February 1906
  - Honorary Knight Grand Cross of the Order of St Michael and St George, 3 July 1918
- Russian Empire: Knight of the Order of St. Alexander Nevsky, 14 January 1916

Political offices
| New office | Minister of Home Affairs; 1885–1890 | Succeeded by Saigō Jūdō |
| Preceded by Sanjō Sanetomi; Acting | Prime Minister of Japan; 1889–1891 | Succeeded by Matsukata Masayoshi |
| Preceded by Kōno Togama | Minister of Justice; 1892–1893 | Succeeded by Itō Hirobumi; Acting |
| Preceded by Ōki Takatō | President of the Privy Council; 1893–1894 | Succeeded by Itō Hirobumi |
| Preceded by Ōkuma Shigenobu | Prime Minister of Japan; 1898–1900 | Succeeded by Itō Hirobumi |
| Preceded by Kuroda Kiyotaka | President of the Privy Council; 1905–1909 | Succeeded by Itō Hirobumi |
| Preceded by Itō Hirobumi | President of the Privy Council; 1909–1922 | Succeeded by Kiyoura Keigo |
Military offices
| Preceded by None | Chief of the Imperial Japanese Army General Staff; 24 December 1878 – 4 September 1882 | Succeeded by Ōyama Iwao |
| Preceded by Ōyama Iwao | Chief of the Imperial Japanese Army General Staff; 13 February 1884 – 22 December 1885 | Succeeded by Prince Arisugawa Taruhito |
| Preceded by Ōyama Iwao | Chief of the Imperial Japanese Army General Staff; 20 June 1904 – 20 December 1905 | Succeeded by Ōyama Iwao |
