= Kōno Togama =

Japanese statesman

Junior Second Rank Viscount Kōno Togama
- 河野 敏鎌
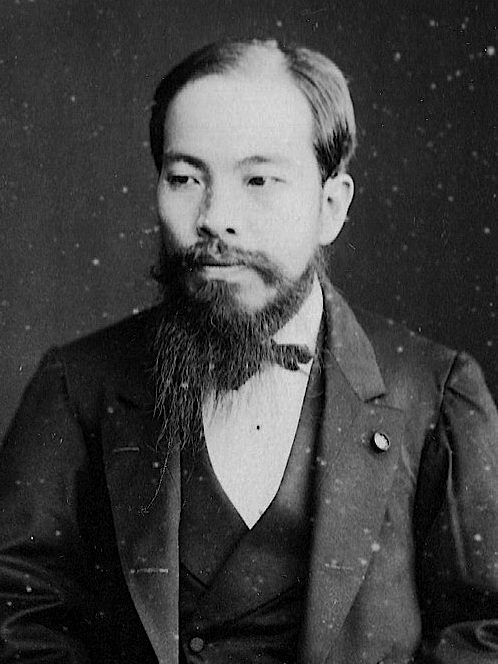
- Viscount Kōno Togama

Minister of Education
- In office 8 August 1892 – 17 March 1893
- Prime Minister: Itō Hirobumi
- Preceded by: Ōki Takatō
- Succeeded by: Inoue Kowashi
- In office 28 February 1880 – 7 April 1881
- Chancellor: Sanjō Sanetomi
- Preceded by: Terashima Munenori
- Succeeded by: Fukuoka Takachika

Minister of Justice
- In office 23 June 1892 – 8 August 1892
- Prime Minister: Matsukata Masayoshi
- Preceded by: Tanaka Fujimaro
- Succeeded by: Yamagata Aritomo

Minister of Home Affairs
- In office 14 July 1892 – 8 August 1892
- Prime Minister: Matsukata Masayoshi
- Preceded by: Matsukata Masayoshi
- Succeeded by: Inoue Kaoru

Minister of Agriculture and Commerce
- In office 14 March 1892 – 14 July 1892
- Prime Minister: Matsukata Masayoshi
- Preceded by: Mutsu Munemitsu
- Succeeded by: Sano Tsunetami
- In office 7 April 1881 – 20 October 1881
- Chancellor: Sanjō Sanetomi
- Preceded by: Office established
- Succeeded by: Saigō Jūdō

Vice Chairman of the Genrōin
- In office 7 June 1878 – 28 February 1880
- Chairman: Prince Arisugawa Taruhito
- Preceded by: Gotō Shōjirō
- Succeeded by: Sasaki Takayuki

Secretary of the Genrōin
- In office 28 November 1875 – 7 June 1878

Member of the Genrōin
- In office 25 April 1875 – 28 November 1875

Governor of Hiroshima Prefecture
- In office 27 November 1871 – 26 December 1871
- Monarch: Meiji
- Preceded by: Senbon Hisanobu
- Succeeded by: Date Muneoki
- In office 15 August 1871 – 15 November 1871
- Monarch: Meiji
- Preceded by: Position established
- Succeeded by: Senbon Hisanobu

Personal details
- Born: 29 November 1844 Kōchi, Tosa, Japan
- Died: 24 April 1895 (aged 50) Tokyo, Japan
- Resting place: Aoyama Cemetery
- Party: Rikken Kaishintō

Viscount Kōno Togama (河野 敏鎌; 29 November 1844 – 24 April 1895) was a Japanese statesman in Meiji period Japan.

== Biography ==
Kōno was born in Kōchi, Tosa Province (present-day Kōchi Prefecture) as the eldest son of a local low-ranking samurai. He was sent to Edo in 1858 where (along with Mutsu Munemitsu) he studied under the noted Confucian scholar, Yasui Sokken. On his return to Tosa in 1861, he joined the Tosa Kinnō-tō movement organized by Takechi Hanpeita and Sakamoto Ryōma and became active in the Sonnō jōi movement. In 1862, along with 59 other Tosa samurai, he marched on Kyoto and Edo in an attempt to influence national policy, but was captured by security forces of the Tokugawa shogunate in 1863 and sentenced to six years in prison. Tortured while in prison, he refused to recant and his sentence was extended to life imprisonment.

After the Meiji Restoration, Kōno was freed and was recruited by fellow Tosa countryman Gotō Shōjirō to assist Etō Shimpei in the administration of Osaka. With the establishment of the Samurai Administration Bureau, he was sent to Hiroshima in 1874. However, with increasing ex-samurai discontent erupted into open rebellion in various locations, he was assigned to assist Ōkubo Toshimichi in restoration of central government authority in Kyūshū. In this capacity, he faced his former mentor Etō Shimpei in the Saga Rebellion. He treated Etō very roughly during his trial, refusing him a chance to defend his actions in court, and pushing for an early death verdict.

Kōno was appointed to the Genrōin in 1875, becoming its vice-chairman in 1878. In 1880, he was appointed Education Lord under the initial Daijō-kan system of the Meiji government, and became Agriculture and Commerce Lord under the same system in 1881. Politically, he allied himself with Ōkuma Shigenobu, joining his Rikken Kaishintō political party as its vice-chairman. In 1888, he was appointed to the Privy Council.

In 1892, Kōno joined the first Matsukata Masayoshi cabinet with overlapping portfolios the Minister of Agriculture & Commerce, Home Minister, Minister of Justice and Minister of Education. He continued to hold the post of Minister of Education under the Second Itō Hirobumi administration.

In 1893, Kōno was ennobled with the rank of shishaku (viscount) in the kazoku peerage system. He died in 1895, and his grave is at Aoyama Cemetery in Tokyo.

== Notes ==
Political offices
| Preceded by New position | Governor of Hiroshima Prefecture; Aug.–Nov. 1871 | Succeeded by Senbon Hisanobu |
| Preceded by Senbon Hisanobu | Governor of Hiroshima Prefecture; Nov.–Dec. 1871 | Succeeded by Date Muneoki |
| Preceded by Mutsu Munemitsu | Minister of Agriculture & Commerce; March–July 1892 | Succeeded by Sano Tsunetami |
| Preceded by Matsukata Masayoshi | Home Minister; July–August 1894 | Succeeded by Inoue Kaoru |
| Preceded by Tanaka Fujimaro | Minister of Justice; June–August 1894 | Succeeded by Yamagata Aritomo |
| Preceded by Ōki Takatō | Minister of Education; August 1892 – March 1893 | Succeeded by Inoue Kaoru |
