= Meiji oligarchy =

Ruling class of Japan during the Meiji period (1868-1912)

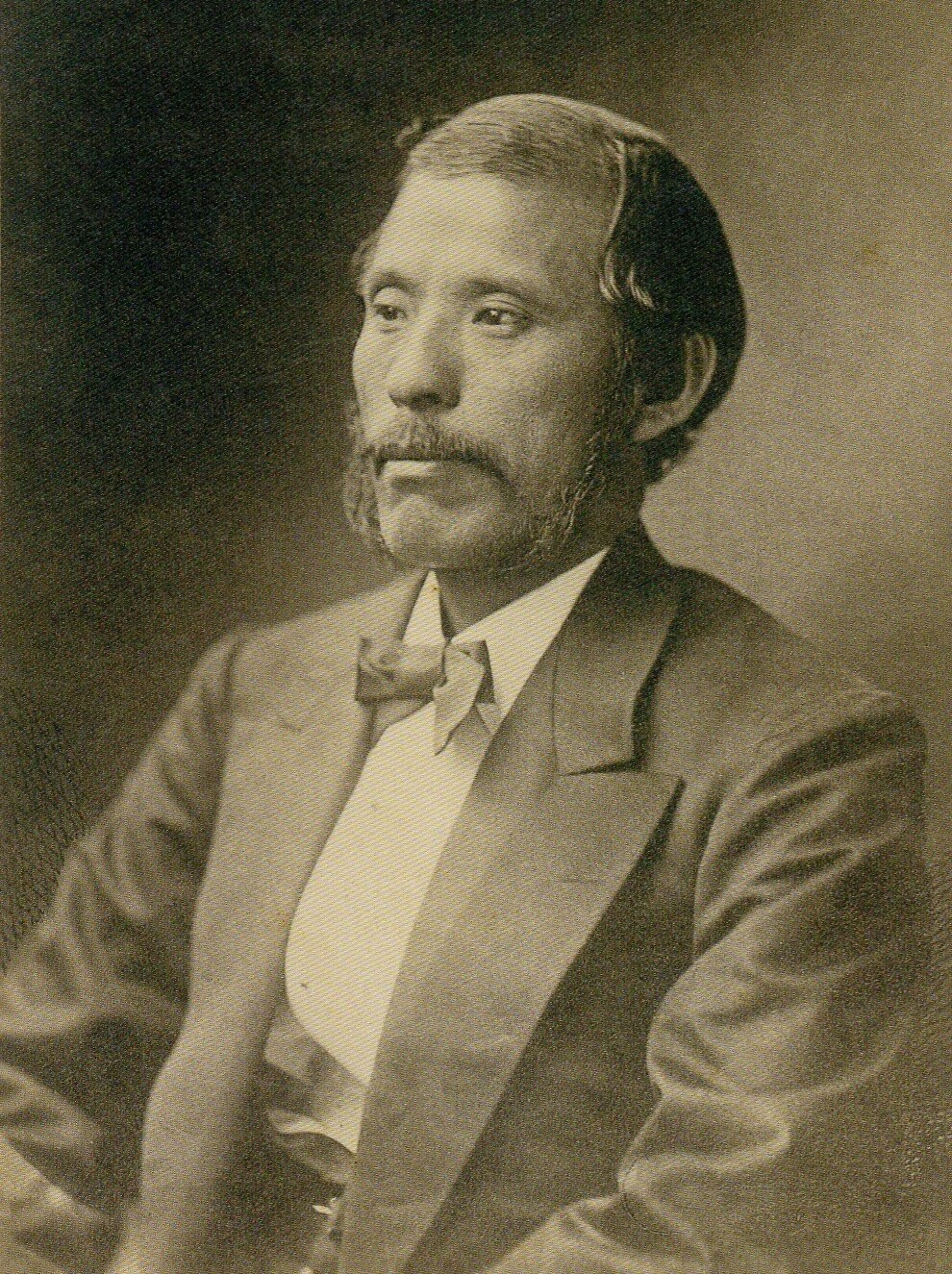
Ōkubo Toshimichi

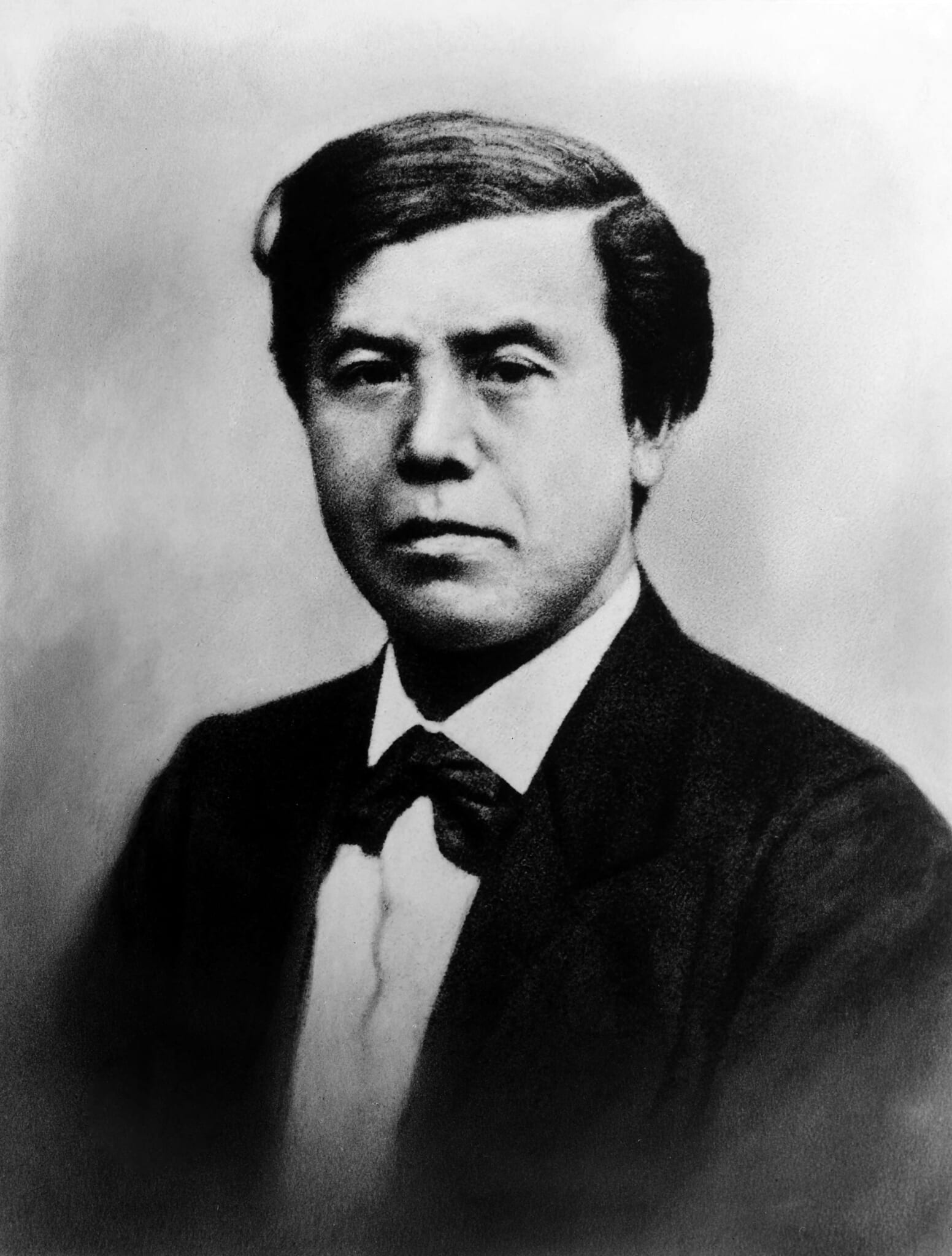
Kido Takayoshi

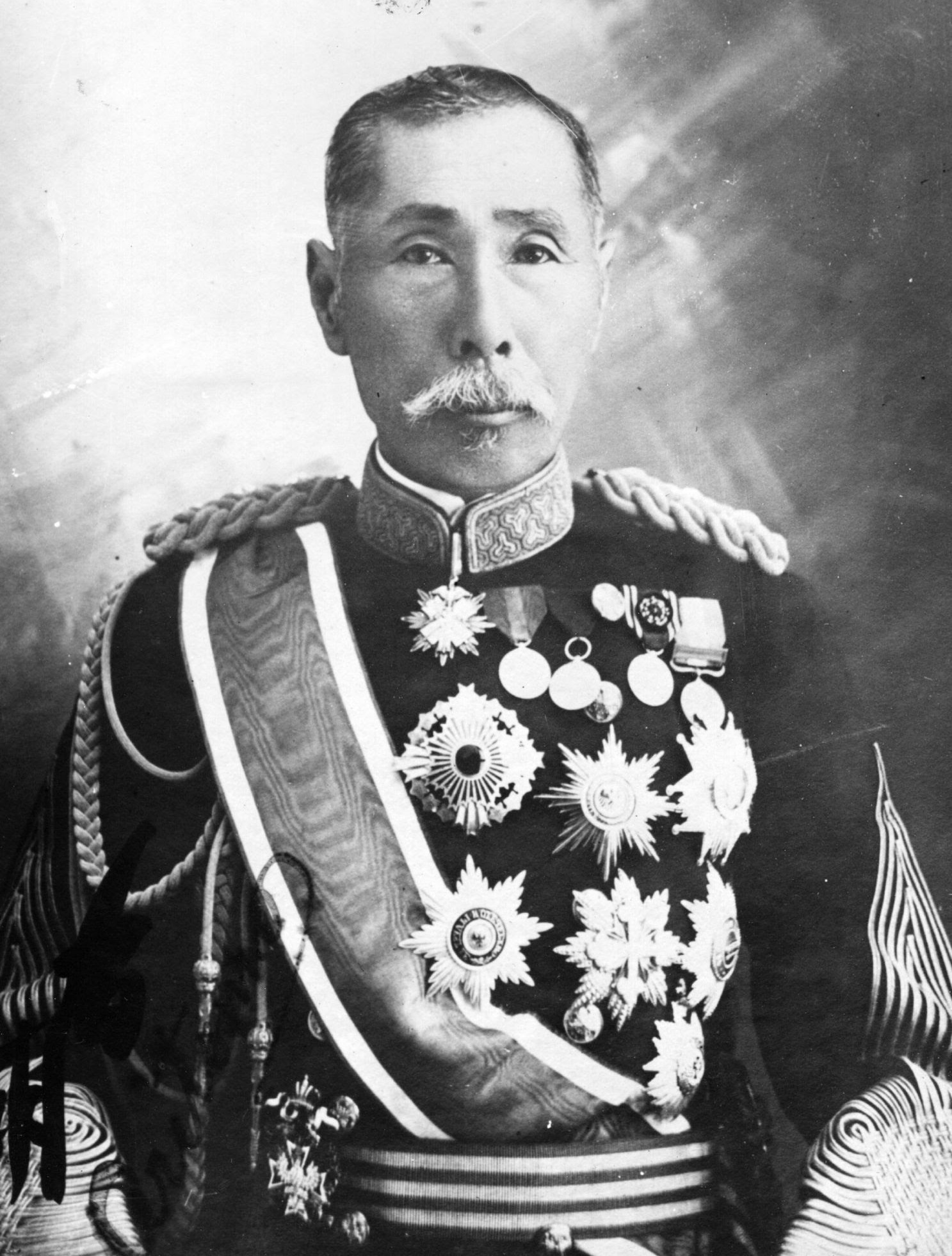
Yamagata Aritomo

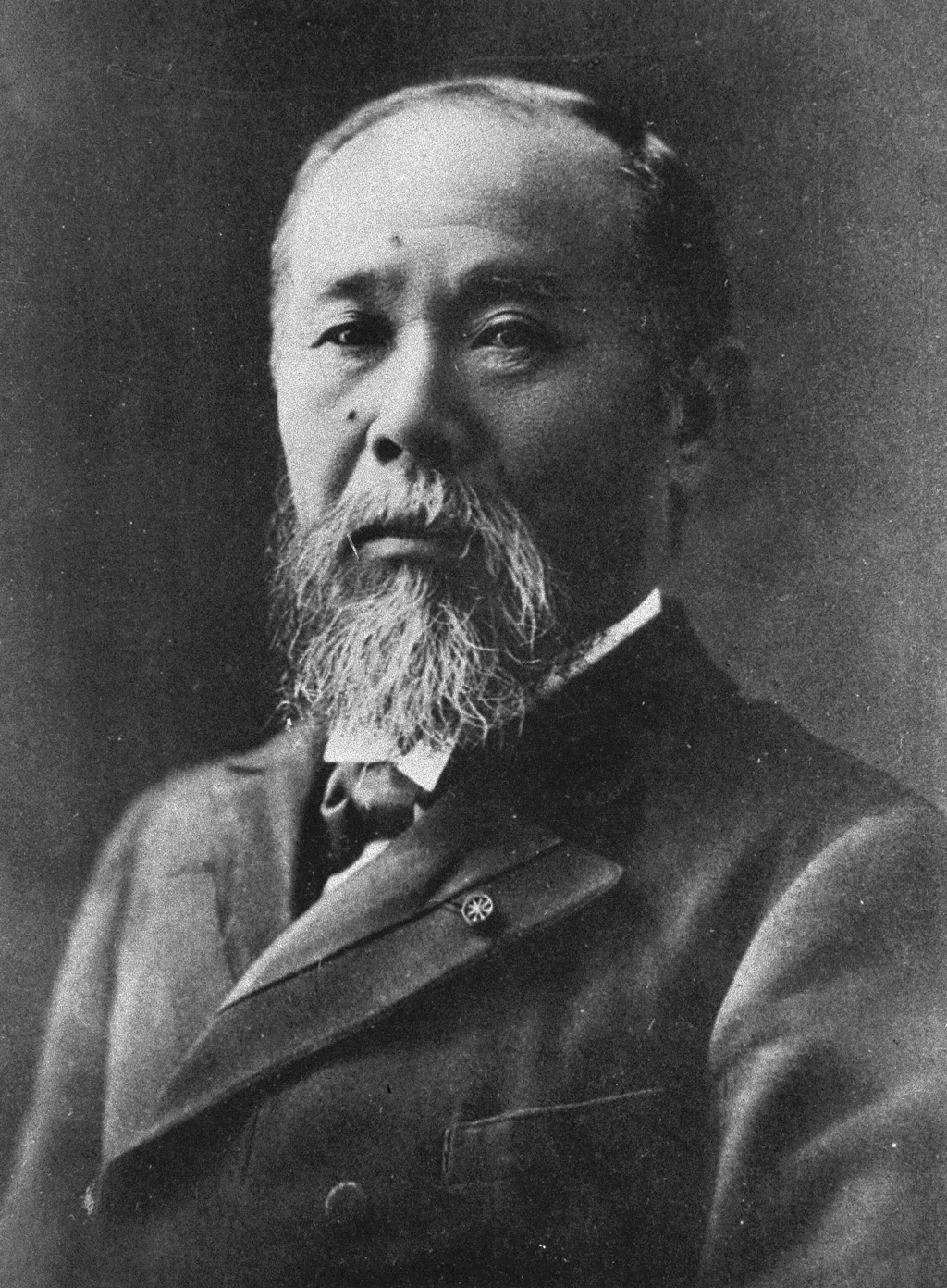
Itō Hirobumi

Prominent members of the Meiji oligarchy

The Meiji oligarchy was the new ruling class of Meiji period Japan. In Japanese, the Meiji oligarchy is called the domain clique (藩閥, hambatsu).

The members of this class were adherents of kokugaku and believed they were the creators of a new order as grand as that established by Japan's original founders. Two of the major figures of this group were Ōkubo Toshimichi (1832–78), son of a Satsuma retainer, and Satsuma samurai Saigō Takamori (1827–77), who had joined forces with Chōshū, Tosa, and Hizen to overthrow the Tokugawa shogunate. Okubo became minister of finance and Saigō a field marshal; both were imperial councillors. Kido Koin (1833–77), a native of Chōshū, student of Yoshida Shōin, and conspirator with Ōkubo and Saigō, became minister of education and chairman of the Governors' Conference and pushed for constitutional government. Also prominent were Iwakura Tomomi (1825–83), a Kyoto native who had opposed the Tokugawa and was to become the first ambassador to the United States, and Ōkuma Shigenobu (1838–1922), of Hizen, a student of Rangaku, Chinese, and English, who held various ministerial portfolios, eventually becoming prime minister in 1898.

To accomplish the new order's goals, the Meiji oligarchy set out to abolish the four divisions of society through a series of economic and social reforms. Tokugawa shogunate revenues had depended on taxes on Tokugawa and other daimyo lands, loans from wealthy peasants and urban merchants, limited customs fees, and reluctantly accepted foreign loans. To provide revenue and develop a sound infrastructure, the new government financed harbor improvements, lighthouses, machinery imports, schools, overseas study for students, salaries for foreign teachers and advisers, modernization of the army and navy, railroads and telegraph networks, and foreign diplomatic missions, such as the Iwakura mission.

Difficult economic times, manifested by increasing incidents of agrarian rioting, led to calls for social reforms. In addition to the old high rents, taxes, and interest rates, the average citizen was faced with cash payments for new taxes, military conscription, and tuition charges for the newly introduced compulsory education. The people needed more time for productive pursuits while correcting social abuses of the past. To achieve these reforms, the old Tokugawa class system of samurai, farmer, artisan, and merchant was abolished by 1871, and, even though old prejudices and status consciousness continued, all were theoretically equal before the law. Actually helping to perpetuate social distinctions, the government named new social divisions: the former daimyō became peerage nobility, the samurai became gentry, and all others became commoners. Daimyō and samurai pensions were paid off in lump sums, and the samurai later lost their exclusive claim to military positions. Former samurai found new pursuits as bureaucrats, teachers, army officers, police officials, journalists, scholars, colonists in the northern parts of Japan, bankers, and businessmen. These occupations helped stem some of the discontent this large group felt; some profited immensely, but many were not successful and provided significant opposition in the ensuing years.

The 1873 Korean crisis resulted in the resignation of military expedition proponents Saigō and Councillor of State Etō Shimpei (1834–74). Etō, the founder of various patriotic organizations, conspired with other discontented elements to start an armed insurrection against government troops in Saga, the capital of his native prefecture in Kyūshū in 1874. Charged with suppressing the revolt, Ōkubo swiftly crushed Etō, who had appealed unsuccessfully to Saigō for help. Three years later, the last major armed uprising—but the most serious challenge to the Meiji government—took shape in the Satsuma Rebellion, this time with Saigō playing an active role. The Saga Rebellion and other agrarian and samurai uprisings mounted in protest to the Meiji reforms had been easily put down by the army. Satsuma's former samurai were numerous, however, and they had a long tradition of opposition to central authority. Saigō, with some reluctance and only after more widespread dissatisfaction with the Meiji reforms, raised a rebellion in 1877. Both sides fought well, but the modern weaponry and better financing of the government forces ended the Satsuma Rebellion. Although he was defeated and committed suicide, Saigō was not branded a traitor and became a heroic figure in Japanese history. The suppression of the Satsuma Rebellion marked the end of serious threats to the Meiji regime but was sobering to the oligarchy. The fight drained the national treasury, led to serious inflation, and forced land values—and badly needed taxes—down. Most important, calls for reform were renewed.

== List of leading Meiji period politicians ==
The following were leading figures in the Meiji Restoration, and in the subsequent Government of Meiji Japan:

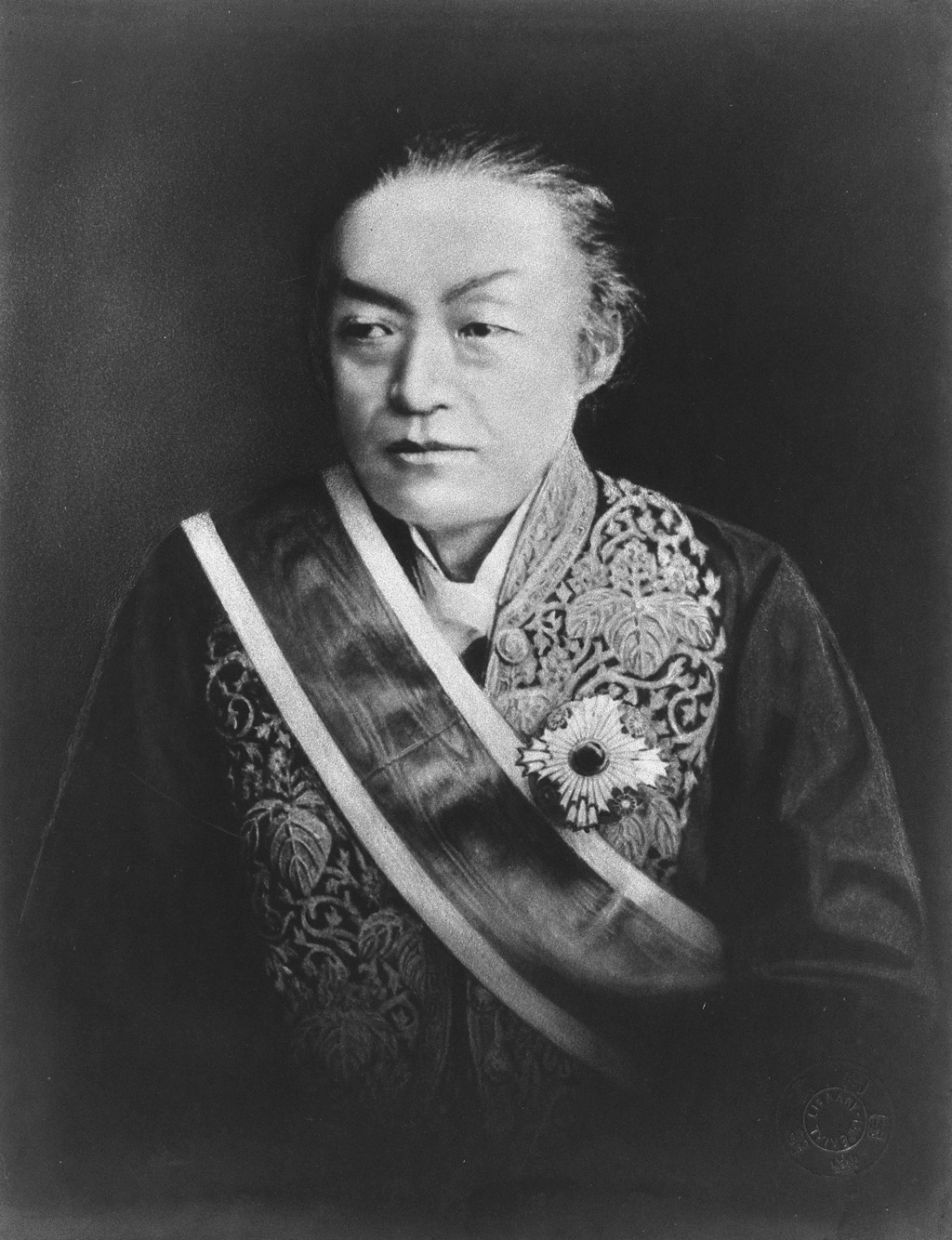
Iwakura Tomomi

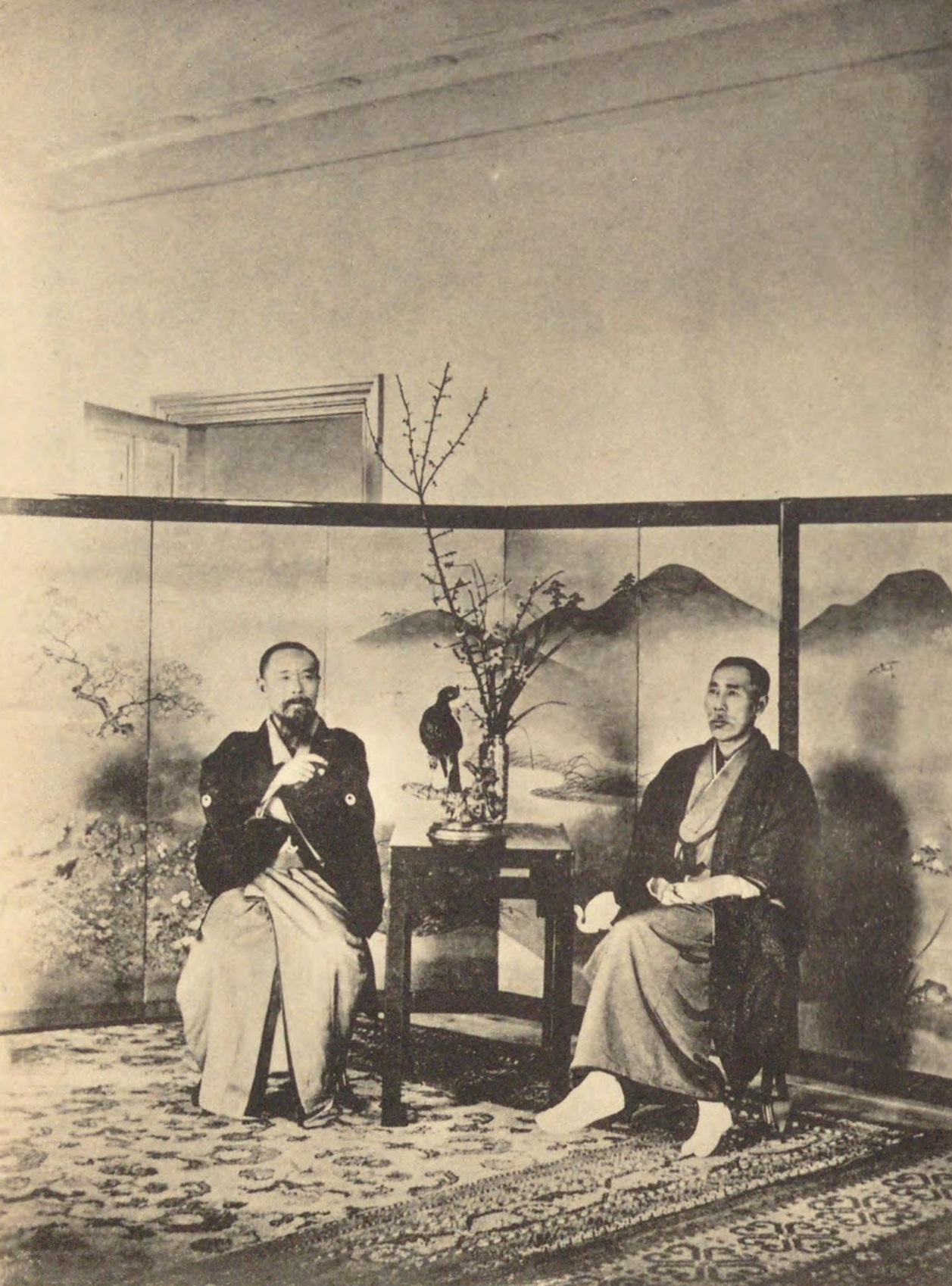
Itō Hirobumi (left) and Yamagata Aritomo (right) in 1896

From the Court nobility:

- Iwakura Tomomi (1825-1883)
- Saionji Kinmochi (1849-1940)
- Sanjō Sanetomi (1837-1891)

From Satsuma Domain:

- Godai Tomoatsu (1836-1885)
- Kabayama Sukenori (1837-1922)
- Kawaji Toshiyoshi (1834-1879)
- Kawamura Sumiyoshi (1836-1904)
- Kuroda Kiyotaka (1840-1900)
- Matsukata Masayoshi (1835-1924)
- Mori Arinori (1847-1889)
- Ōkubo Toshimichi (1830-1878)
- Oyama Iwao (1842-1916)
- Saigō Takamori (1827-1877)
- Saigō Tsugumichi (1843-1902)
- Takashima Tomonosuke (1844-1916)
- Terashima Munenori (1836-1893)
- Yamamoto Gonnohyōe (1852-1933)

From Chōshū Domain:

- Inoue Kaoru (1835-1915)
- Itō Hirobumi (1841-1909)
- Katsura Tarō (1848-1913)
- Kido Takayoshi (1833-1877)
- Ōmura Masujirō (1824-1869)
- Shinagawa Yajirō (1843-1900)
- Sone Arasuke (1849-1910)
- Yamada Akiyoshi (1844-1892)
- Yamagata Aritomo (1838-1922)

From Tosa Domain:

- Gotō Shōjirō (1838-1897)
- Itagaki Taisuke (1837-1919)
- Kōno Togama (1844-1895)
- Sasaki Takayuki (1830-1910)

From Hizen Domain:

- Etō Shimpei (1834-1874)
- Itō Miyoji (1857-1934)
- Oki Takato (1832-1899)
- Ōkuma Shigenobu (1838-1922)
- Sano Tsunetami (1822-1902)
- Soejima Taneomi (1828-1905)

Former leading figures of the Tokugawa shogunate:

- Enomoto Takeaki (1836-1908)
- Katsu Kaishū (1823-1899)

Others:

- Inoue Kowashi (1844-1905)
- Kaneko Kentarō (1853-1942)
- Kiyoura Keigo (1850-1942)
- Mutsu Munemitsu (1844-1897)
- Suematsu Kenchō (1855-1920)
- Tanaka Fujimaro (1845-1909)
- Watanabe Kunitake (1846-1919)
- Yokoi Shonan (1809-1869)
- Yoshikawa Akimasa (1842-1920)
- Yuri Kimimasa (1829-1912)

== See also ==
- Genrō
- Government of Meiji Japan
- Meiji Restoration
