= Blood tax =

Blood tax may refer to:

- The old Brazilian forced recruitment
- The Devşirme of the Ottoman Empire
- The Formosa blood tax instituted by Hans Putmans
- The Japanese Conscription Ordinance of 1873 that led to the Blood tax riots
