= Tanaka Fujimaro =

Japanese politician (1845–1909)

Senior Second Rank Viscount Tanaka Fujimaro
- 田中 不二麿
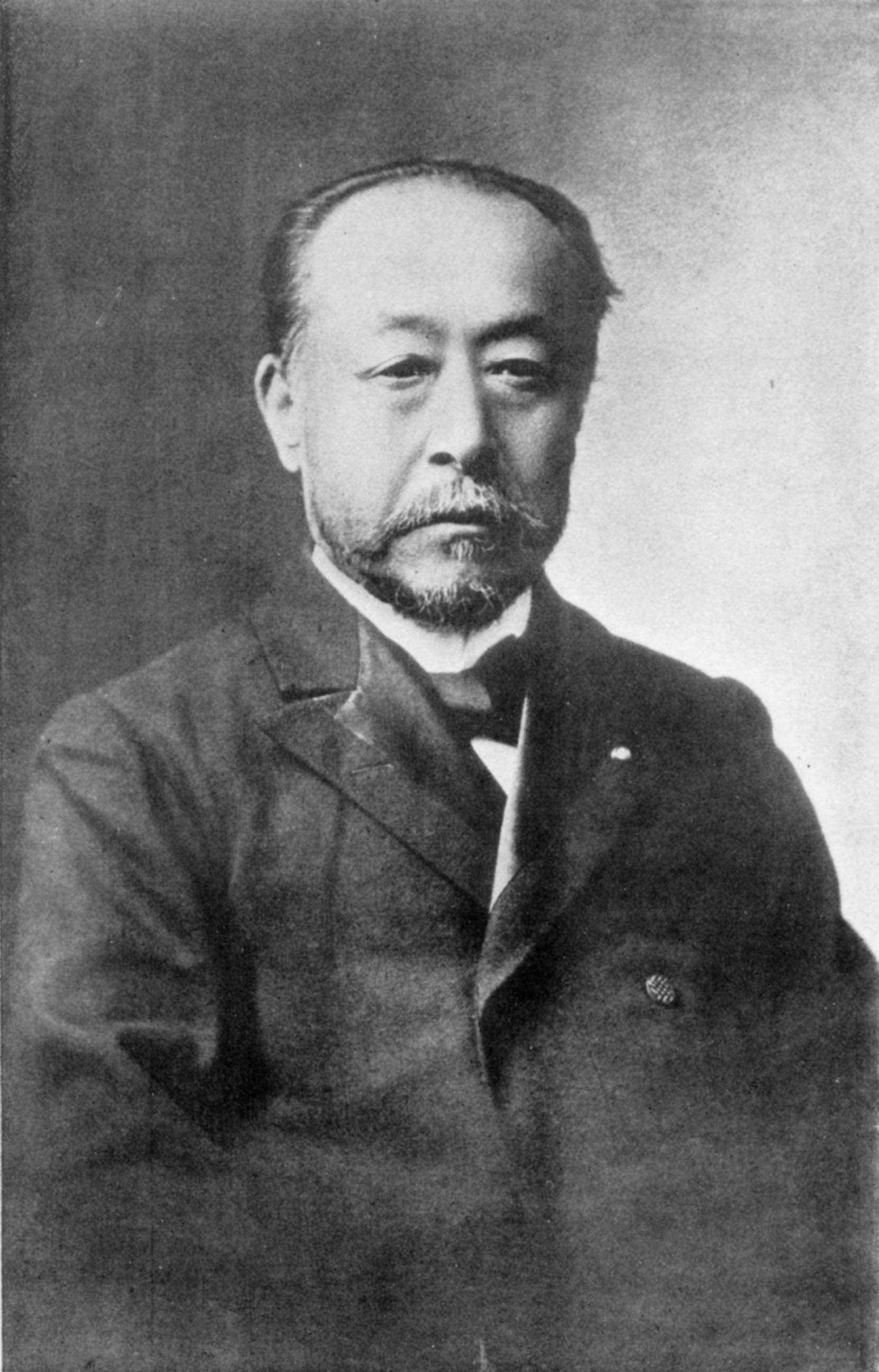

Minister of Justice
- In office 1 June 1891 – 23 June 1892
- Prime Minister: Matsukata Masayoshi
- Preceded by: Yamada Akiyoshi
- Succeeded by: Kōno Togama

Lord of Justice
- In office 15 March 1880 – 21 October 1881
- Monarch: Meiji
- Preceded by: Ōki Takatō
- Succeeded by: Ōki Takatō

Interim Minister of Education
- In office 13 May 1874 – 24 May 1878
- Monarch: Meiji
- Preceded by: Kido Takayoshi
- Succeeded by: Saigō Jūdō

Member of the Genrōin
- In office 5 March 1878 – 15 March 1880

Personal details
- Born: 16 October 1845 Nagoya, Owari, Japan
- Died: 1 February 1909 (aged 63) Mejiro, Tokyo, Japan
- Occupation: Politician, Educator

Viscount Tanaka Fujimaro (田中 不二麿; 16 October 1845 – 1 February 1909) was a Japanese statesman and educator in Meiji period Japan.

== Biography ==
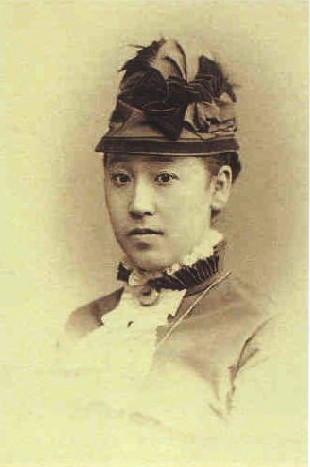
Tanaka Suma, his spouse

Tanaka was born in Owari Province (present-day Aichi Prefecture). After the Meiji Restoration, he was selected to accompany the Iwakura Mission on its around-the-world journey to the United States and Europe. He was especially impressed from what he saw of western educational systems. On his return to Japan in March 1873 (six months earlier than the rest of the Mission), he was made Vice Minister for Education in 1874.

He returned to the United States in 1877 for further first-hand research on school systems. He spent considerable time at Amherst College and approached Amherst president Julius H. Seelye for advice. He also visited the Centennial Exposition in Philadelphia, after which he submitted a report with photographs to the government. On his return to Japan, Tanaka strongly criticized the Education Order of 1875, which he felt made the system too centralized and inflexible. The new Education Order of 1879 was based on his experiences in the United States, but it quickly came under attack as being confusing and inviting moral decay. Tanaka transferred from the Ministry of Education in 1880 to the Ministry of Justice, and subsequently served in various positions in the Meiji government. He was ennobled with the kazoku peerage title of shishaku (viscount) in 1887.

== See also ==
History of Education in Japan
