= Senbon Hisanobu =

Japanese politician

- 千本 久信

Governor of Hiroshima Prefecture
- In office 15 November 1871 – 27 November 1871
- Monarch: Meiji
- Preceded by: Kōno Togama
- Succeeded by: Kōno Togama

Personal details
- Born: 13 July 1827 Asuwa, Echizen, Japan
- Died: 15 October 1885 (aged 58)

Senbon Hisanobu (13 July 1827 – 15 October 1885) was a Japanese politician of the early Meiji period who served as governor of Hiroshima Prefecture from 15 to 27 November 1871.

Preceded by Kōno Togama	Governor of Hiroshima Prefecture; November 1871	Succeeded by Kōno Togama
