= Sano Tsunetami =

Japanese statesman

Senior Second Rank Count Sano Tsunetami
- 佐野 常民
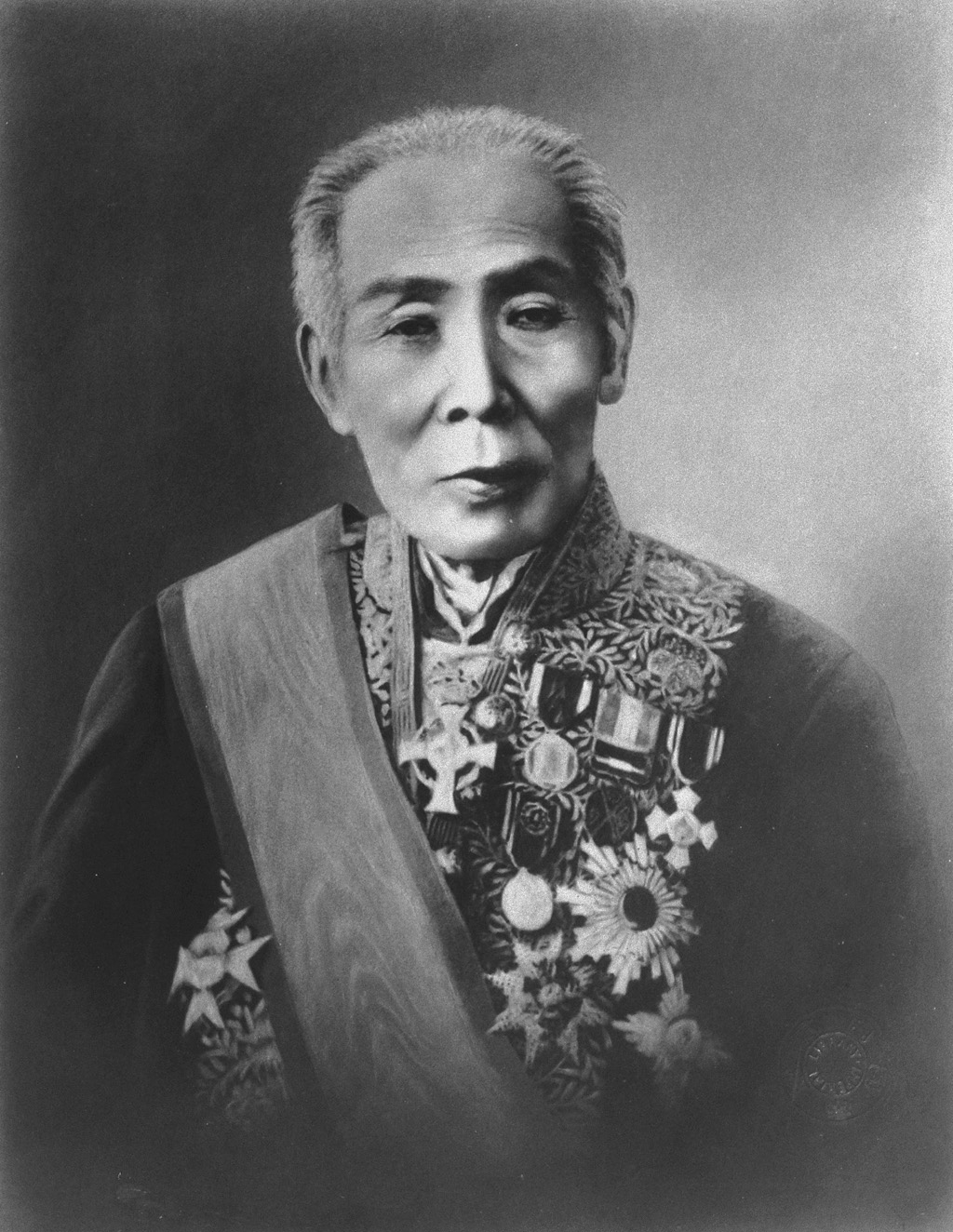

Minister of Agriculture and Commerce
- In office 14 July 1892 – 8 August 1892
- Prime Minister: Matsukata Masayoshi
- Preceded by: Kōno Togama
- Succeeded by: Gotō Shōjirō

Chairman of the Genrōin
- In office 12 September 1882 – 22 December 1885
- Monarch: Meiji
- Deputy: Himself
- Preceded by: Terashima Munenori
- Succeeded by: Ōki Takatō

Vice Chairman of the Genrōin
- In office 12 September 1882 – 22 December 1885
- Chairman: Himself
- Preceded by: Sasaki Takayuki
- Succeeded by: Higashikuze Michitomi

Minister of Finance
- In office 28 February 1880 – 21 October 1881
- Chancellor: Sanjō Sanetomi
- Preceded by: Ōkuma Shigenobu
- Succeeded by: Matsukata Masayoshi

Member of the Privy Council
- In office 8 August 1892 – 7 December 1902
- Monarch: Meiji
- In office 30 April 1888 – 14 July 1892
- Monarch: Meiji

Member of the Genrōin
- In office 2 July 1875 – 28 February 1880

Personal details
- Born: 28 December 1822 Hayatsue, Hizen, Japan
- Died: 12 December 1902 (aged 79) Tokyo, Japan
- Resting place: Aoyama Cemetery
- Children: Sano Tsuneha
- Relatives: Akihiko Okamura (great-grandson)
- Known for: Founding the Japanese Red Cross Society

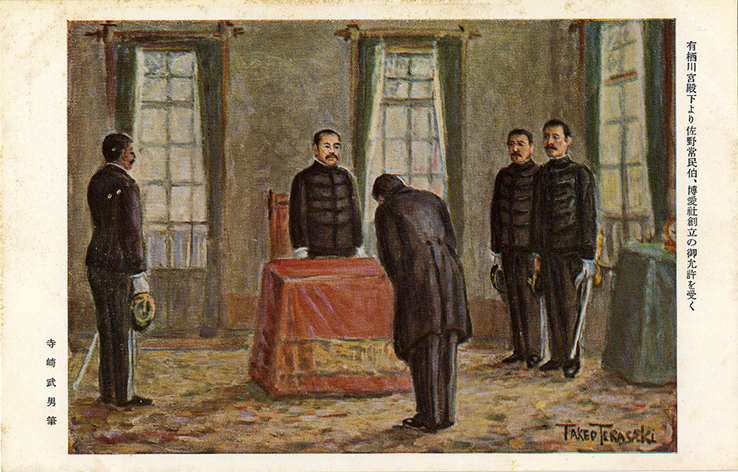
Sano Tsunetami receives the permission to establish the Philanthropic Society by Prince Arisugawa Taruhito in 1877

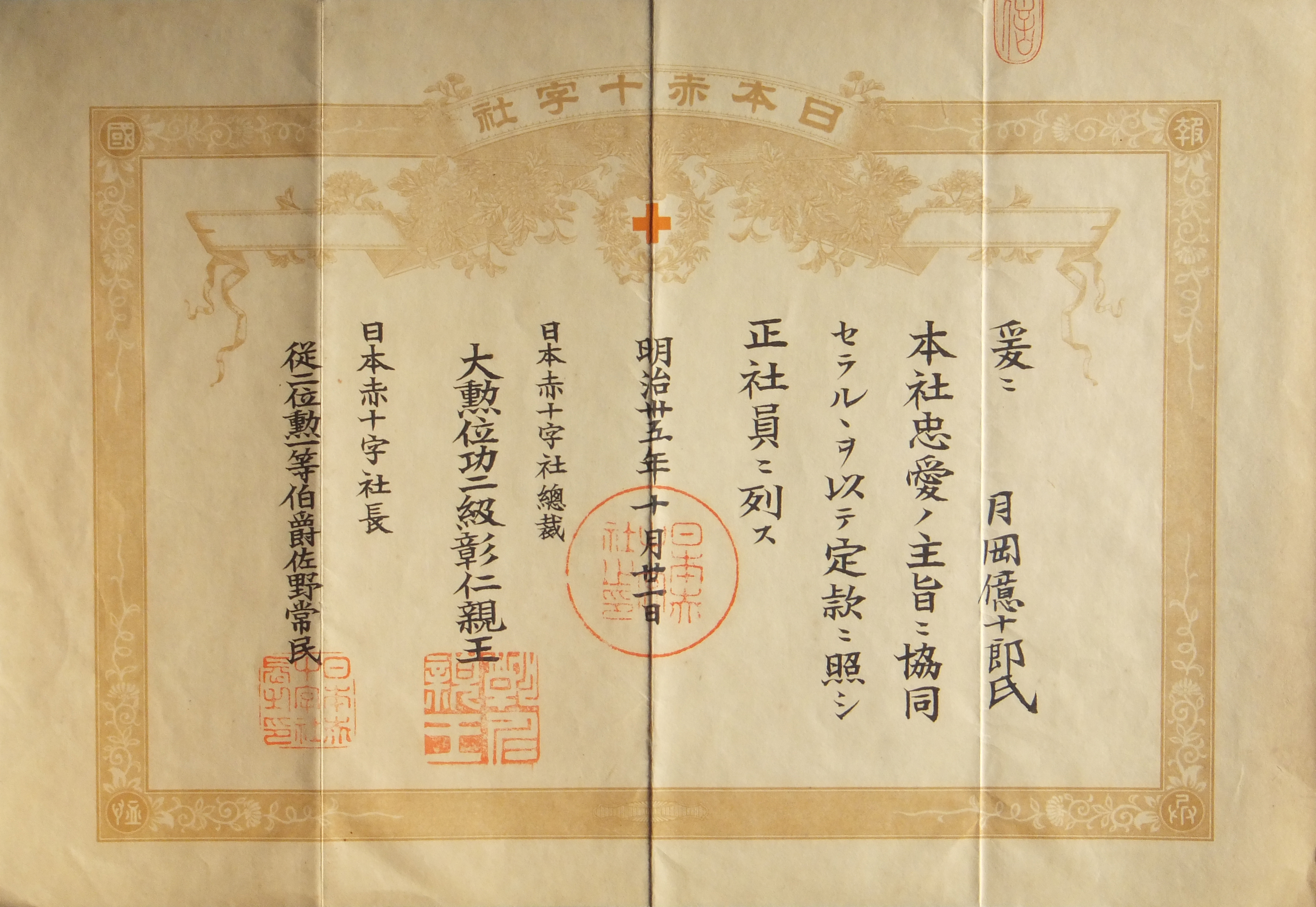
Red-Cross Society membership certificate issued in 1902 by prince Komatsu-no-miya Akihito and Sano Tsunetami

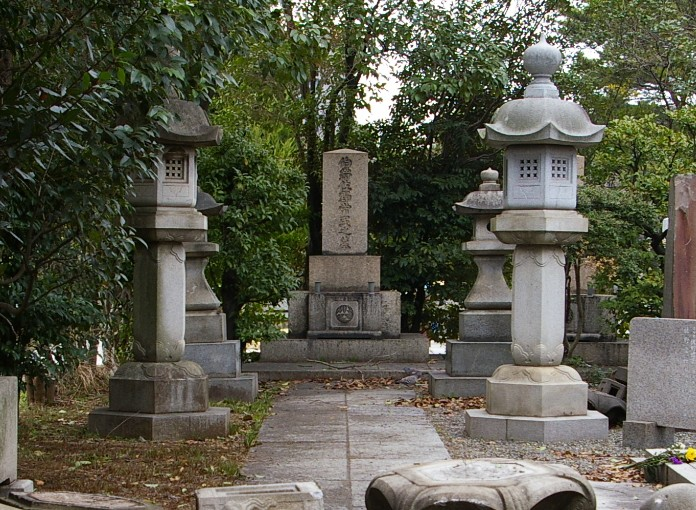
Sano Tsunetami's grave in the Aoyama cemetery (Tokyo)

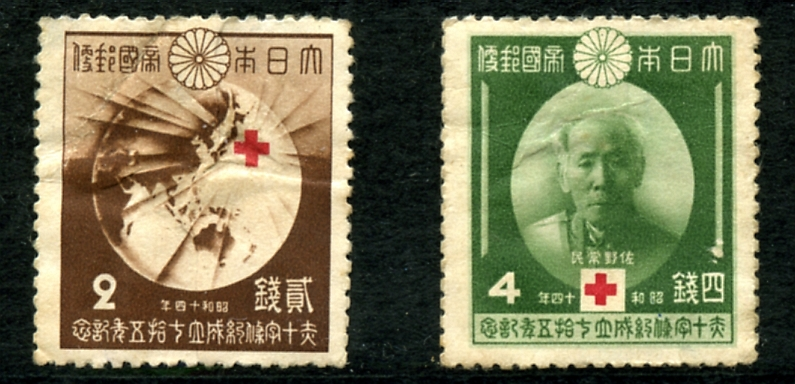
1939 Commemorative Postage Stamps on 75th Anniversary of the Japanese Red Cross

Count Sano Tsunetami (佐野 常民; 28 December 1822 – 12 December 1902) was a Japanese statesman and founder of the Japanese Red Cross Society. His son, Admiral Sano Tsuneha, was a leading figure in the establishment of the Scout Association of Japan.

== Biography ==
Sano was born in Hayatsue, Saga Domain (present-day Saga city, Saga Prefecture) as the fifth son of the low ranking samurai Shimomura Saburōzaemon. In 1831 he was adopted by the physician Sano Tsuneyoshi and was allowed to study at the domain academy Kōdōkan. He accompanied his step-father to Edo in 1837, where he studied Confucianism, but returned to Saga in 1839 to continue his medical education. In 1846, he was sent by the Nabeshima clan, rulers of Saga, to study rangaku (western learning) in Kyoto under Hirose Genkyō, and subsequently in Osaka under Ogata Kōan. He then returned to Edo in 1849 to study under Itō Gemboku, Totsuka Seikai, and others. In 1851, he returned to Saga to establish his own academy, which received official recognition from Nabeshima Naomasa, the daimyō of Saga in 1853.

Nabeshima Naomasa had a strong interest in western technology and with the opening of the Nagasaki Naval Training Center in 1855. Sano was selected by the domain as one of its first students. The goal of Saga Domain was to build a western-style steam warship, which Sano helped complete in 1865.

Sano accompanied the Japanese delegation to the Paris Exposition of 1867, and while in Paris learned of the International Red Cross. He traveled on to the Netherlands, where he ordered the Japanese warship Nisshin, and stayed on to supervise its construction and to learn of western shipbuilding techniques, but the image of the Red Cross remained in his memory.

After the Meiji Restoration, Sano was called upon to assist in the formation of the Imperial Japanese Navy and received a posting at the Ministry of War in 1870. In 1873, he was sent to visit the 1873 Vienna World Exposition, with Alexander von Siebold as his interpreter. In 1875, he was appointed to the Genrōin. With the start of the Satsuma Rebellion in 1877, Sano created the Hakuaisha ('Philanthropic Society'), a relief organization to provide medical assistance to wounded soldiers from both sides of the conflict. This idea met with tremendous opposition and incomprehension by many members of the government, but Sano was able to enlist the support of Prince Arisugawa Taruhito, nominal head of the Imperial Japanese Army and Prince Komatsu Akihito. Sano's organization became the Japanese Red Cross Society in 1887, with Sano as its first president.

Sano also created the Ryuchikai, the forerunner of the Japan Art Association in 1879, in an attempt to stem the outflow of Japanese important cultural properties to overseas collectors.

From 1880 to 1881, he served in the Ministry of Finance, and in 1882 as president of the Genrōin. In 1886, he helped establish the first Red Cross Hospital in Japan.

In 1887, Sano was recognized for his accomplishments with elevation to the kazoku peerage with the title of viscount (shishaku) and was appointed a member of the Privy Council in 1888. In 1892, during the 1st Matsukata administration, he was appointed as Minister of Agriculture and Commerce.

In 1895, Sano was elevated to the title of count (hakushaku). On his death at his home in Tokyo in 1902, he was posthumously awarded with the Order of the Rising Sun (1st class with Paulownia Blossoms). His grave is at Aoyama Cemetery in Tokyo.

In 1939, the Japanese government issued a series of four commemorative postage stamps honoring the 75th anniversary of the Red Cross Treaty. A portrait of Sano Tsunetami appears on two of the stamps.

Political offices
| Preceded by Kōno Togama | Minister of Agriculture & Commerce; July–August 1892 | Succeeded by Gotō Shōjirō |
