= Ōki Takatō =

Japanese statesman (1832-1899)

Senior Second Rank Count Ōki Takatō
- 大木 喬任
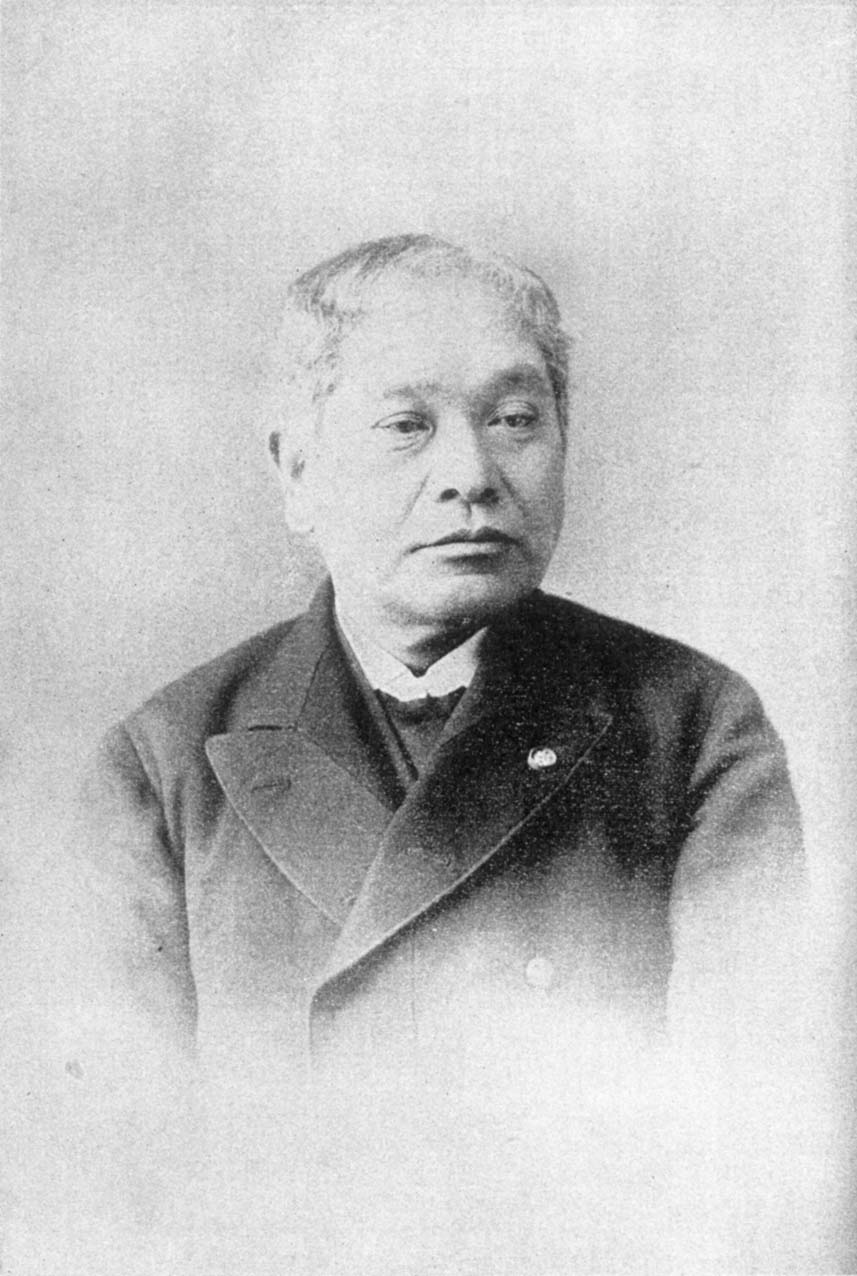

President of the Privy Council
- In office 8 August 1892 – 11 March 1893
- Monarch: Meiji
- Preceded by: Ito Hirobumi
- Succeeded by: Yamagata Aritomo
- In office 30 October 1889 – 1 June 1891
- Monarch: Meiji
- Preceded by: Ito Hirobumi
- Succeeded by: Ito Hirobumi
Additional positions
Chairman of the Genrōin
In office 22 December 1885 – 24 December 1889
Monarch	Meiji
Deputy	Higashikuze Michitomi; Yanagiwara Sakimitsu
Preceded by	Sano Tsunetami
Succeeded by	Yanagiwara Sakimitsu
In office 28 February 1880 – 21 October 1881
Monarch	Meiji
Deputy	Sasaki Takayuki
Preceded by	Prince Arisugawa Taruhito
Succeeded by	Terashima Munenori
Minister of Education
In office 1 June 1891 – 8 August 1892
Prime Minister	Matsukata Masayoshi
Preceded by	Yoshikawa Akimasa
Succeeded by	Kōno Togama
In office 12 December 1883 – 22 December 1885
Monarch	Meiji
Preceded by	Fukuoka Takachika
Succeeded by	Mori Arinori
In office 12 September 1871 – 19 April 1873
Monarch	Meiji
Preceded by	Office established
Succeeded by	Kido Takayoshi
Lord of Justice
In office 21 October 1881 – 12 December 1883
Monarch	Meiji
Preceded by	Tanaka Fujimaro
Succeeded by	Yamada Akiyoshi
In office 25 October 1873 – 28 February 1880
Monarch	Meiji
Preceded by	Etō Shinpei
Succeeded by	Tanaka Fujimaro

Member of the Privy Council
- In office 30 April 1888 – 24 December 1889
- Monarch: Meiji

Governor of Tokyo
- In office 16 January 1869 – 22 August 1869
- Monarch: Meiji
- Preceded by: Karasumaru Mitsue
- Succeeded by: Mibu Motōsa

Personal details
- Born: 23 March 1832 Saga, Hizen, Japan
- Died: 26 September 1899 (aged 67) Tokyo, Japan
- Children: Enkichi Ōki

Count Ōki Takatō (大木 喬任; March 23, 1832 – September 26, 1899), was a Japanese statesman during the early Meiji period. He was Governor of Tokyo in 1868 and a member of the Japanese Privy Council in 1889.

== Early life ==
Ōki was born into a samurai family in Saga, in Hizen province (present-day Saga prefecture). He studied at the domain school Kodokan, and promoted reform of the domain administration. During the Boshin War he was a leader in the Saga forces committed to the overthrow of the Tokugawa shogunate.

== Career ==
After the Meiji Restoration, Ōki supervised the transfer of the imperial capital from Kyoto to Tokyo, and was appointed the second Governor of Tokyo.

In 1871, he became Education Minister and is credited with establishing Japan's modern educational system. In 1873, he became sangi (councillor) and in 1876, Justice Minister and was concerned with the punishment of the disgruntled ex-samurai involved in the Hagi Rebellion and the Shimpūren Rebellion. In 1880, he became chairman of the Genrōin . He also worked on developing Japan's civil code as the president of the ‘Civil Code Compiling Council’.

In 1884, he was elevated to the title of hakushaku (count) in the new kazoku peerage system.

From 1888 he served on the Privy Council, becoming chairman in 1889. Later he was appointed Justice Minister under the First Yamagata Cabinet, and the Education Minister under the First Matsukata Cabinet.

His eldest son, Ōki Enkichi was also a politician, and a cabinet member during the Taishō period.
