= Abolition of the han system =

1871 reform abolishing the feudal system in Meiji-era Japan

The abolition of the han system (廃藩置県, haihan-chiken) in the Empire of Japan and its replacement by a system of prefectures in 1871 was the culmination of the Meiji Restoration begun in 1868, the starting year of the Meiji period. Under the reform, all daimyos (大名, daimyō, feudal lords) were required to return their authority to the Emperor Meiji and his house. The process was accomplished in several stages, resulting in a new centralized government of Meiji Japan and the replacement of the old feudal system with a new oligarchy.

== Boshin War ==
After the defeat of forces loyal to the Tokugawa shogunate during the Boshin War in 1868, the new Meiji government confiscated all lands formerly under direct control of the Shogunate (天領) and lands controlled by daimyos who remained loyal to the Tokugawa cause. These lands accounted for approximately a quarter of the land area of Japan and were reorganized into prefectures with governors appointed directly by the central government.

== Return of the domains ==
The second phase in the abolition of the han came in 1869. The movement was spearheaded by Kido Takayoshi of the Chōshū Domain, with the backing of court nobles Iwakura Tomomi and Sanjō Sanetomi. Kido persuaded the lords of Chōshū and of Satsuma, the two leading domains in the overthrow of the Tokugawa, to voluntarily surrender their domains to the Emperor. Between July 25, 1869, and August 2, 1869, fearing that their loyalty would be questioned, the daimyos of 260 other domains followed suit. Only 14 domains failed to initially comply voluntarily with the return of the domains (版籍奉還, hanseki hōkan), and were then ordered to do so by the Court, under the threat of military action.

In return for surrendering their hereditary authority to the central government, the daimyos were re-appointed as non-hereditary governors of their former domains (which were renamed as prefectures), and were allowed to keep ten percent of the tax revenues, based on actual rice production (which was greater than the nominal rice production upon which their feudal obligations under the Shogunate were formerly based).

As governors, the former daimyos could name subordinates, but only if the subordinates met qualification levels established by the central government. Furthermore, hereditary stipends to their samurai retainers were paid out of the prefectural office by the central government, and not directly by the governor, a move calculated to further weaken the traditional feudal ties.

The term daimyō was abolished in July 1869 as well, with the formation of the kazoku peerage system.

== Consolidation ==
Although the former daimyos had become government employees, they still retained a measure of military and fiscal independence, and enjoyed the customary veneration of their former subjects. This was considered an increasing threat to central authority by Ōkubo Toshimichi and other members of the new Meiji oligarchy, especially with the large number of ex-samurai revolts occurring around the country. In August 1871, Okubo, assisted by Saigō Takamori, Kido Takayoshi, Iwakura Tomomi and Yamagata Aritomo, forced through an Imperial Edict which reorganized the 261 surviving ex-feudal domains into three urban prefectures (府, fu) and 302 prefectures (県, ken). The number was then reduced through consolidation the following year to three urban prefectures and 72 prefectures, and later to the present three urban prefectures and 44 prefectures by 1888.

The central government accomplished this reorganization by promising the former daimyos a generous stipend, absorbing the domain's debts, and promising to convert the domain currency (hansatsu) to the new national currency at face value. The central treasury proved unable to support such generosity, so in 1874, the ex-daimyōs' stipend was transformed into government bonds with a face value equivalent to five years' worth of stipends, and paying five percent interest per year. Samurai serving former daimyos also received tradable government bonds of former salary dependent value. The owners of the bonds received interest until the bonds were reimbursed, which was decided by annual lottery. In 30 years, all bonds for samurais were reimbursed.

Makino Nobuaki, a student member of the Iwakura Mission, remarked in his memoirs: "Together with the abolition of the han system, dispatching the Iwakura Mission to America and Europe must be cited as the most important events that built the foundation of our state after the Restoration."
