= Blood tax riots =

1873 protests against military conscription in Meiji-era Japan

- Date: March to June, 1873
- Location: Numerous uprisings across Japan
- Caused by: The institution of military conscription in Japan; The institution of mandatory public schooling for children; Rumors that the government would forcibly extract people's blood; Popular anger at Burakumin emancipation
- Methods: Assaults on government property and personnel; Extrajudicial killings of former outcasts

Parties
Peasant farmers; Rural samurai	Meiji oligarchs; Local government officials; Police officers; Samurai mercenaries

Casualties
- Deaths: 24 non-rioters murdered in Okayama alone, hundreds of rioters killed by police and mercenaries
- Arrested: >60,000
- Executions: 15

The blood tax riots (血税一揆, Ketsuzei ikki) were a series of violent uprisings around Japan in the spring of 1873 in opposition to the institution of mandatory military conscription for all male citizens (described as a "blood tax") in the wake of the Meiji Restoration. Secondary causes included popular anger at the Burakumin Emancipation Edict of 1871 and the institution of mandatory public schooling for children in 1872.

Extending across at least 10 prefectures and involving hundreds of thousands of peasant farmers and rural samurai, the blood tax riots destroyed government offices, police stations, newly established public schools, and the homes of government officials and newly emancipated Burakumin (former outcasts). However, the riots were brutally suppressed by the Meiji government, which adopted a "shoot-to-kill" policy and brought in hired samurai mercenaries when police proved ineffective.

== Background ==
Following the Meiji Restoration of 1868, which overthrew the Tokugawa Shogunate, Japan embarked on a crash course program of modernization. As a prelude to the full abolition of the Tokugawa-era class and status system, outcast status was abolished by the 1871 Burakumin Emancipation Edict, mandatory public schooling for all children was implemented in 1872, and in January 1873, the new Meiji government enacted the Conscription Ordinance, which required all male citizens, including both samurai and non-samurai alike, to submit to mandatory military conscription at the age of 20, serving in the military for three years, and then serving in a national military reserve thereafter.

Conscription deprived impoverished farming villages of strong young men at the peak of their physical prowess whose strength was desperately needed to perform manual labor. Similarly, mandatory public schooling deprived peasant families of their children's labor, which was needed to help with the planting and harvesting of crops. The emancipation of outcasts was objectionable because, after centuries of living under the rigidly enforced Tokugawa status system, whereby outcasts were deemed "non-human" (非人, hinin) and forcibly segregated, people of other classes found it intolerable that the former outcasts were now deemed "new citizens" (新平民, shin heimin) and were free to mingle amongst those who had so recently been considered their superiors.

As for samurai, the Conscription Ordinance's drafting of commoners into military service destroyed their cherished monopoly on military service and thus threatened their self-image and way of life, leading some rural samurai to make common cause with non-samurai in opposing the ordinance.

An additional source of outrage was that the Conscription Ordinance contained a provision allowing wealthy citizens to buy themselves out of conscription, meaning that the burden of conscription would disproportionately fall upon the poorest of Japan's citizens, who could least afford to lose family labor.

The Conscription Ordinance itself was inspired by western models, and the text of the ordinance directly translated a flowery French term for mandatory military service, impôt du sang, literally meaning "blood tax." Seizing on the injudicious use of this phrase, wild rumors spread throughout the countryside that government agents were coming to literally extract blood from peasants and sell it to foreigners who would use it to make medicines, helping further fuel popular outrage.

As Meiji Japan was not a democracy, and the Meiji oligarchs made all decisions without any consultation with the general public, enraged farmers and low-ranking rural samurai felt they had no outlet to air their grievances other than violent protest.

== Riots ==
Uprisings began in March 1873, and rapidly spread to a total of at least 10 prefectures. Affected prefectures included Kyoto, Okayama, Fukui, Mie, Tottori, Hiroshima, Shimane, Kagawa, Ehime, and Kōchi. The rioters targeted the symbols and agents of the Meiji reforms that were disrupting their previous way of life: local government offices and officials, newly established public schools and police stations, Buddhist temples that were serving as government agents, and newly emancipated outcasts.

For example, in late May 1873, over 30,000 people rioted in Okayama prefecture, destroying 46 public elementary schools. In addition, they destroyed 2 temples, the residences of 52 local government officials, and over 300 houses owned by newly emancipated Burakumin. Arming themselves with bamboo spears, guns, and swords, they attacked government officials and former outcasts, wounding dozens and killing 24. Of the 24 people murdered in the violence in Okayama, 18 were recently emancipated former outcasts.

Similarly in Kagawa prefecture, an army of 20,000 angry peasants bearing bamboo sticks and beating drums went on a rampage, burning down 34 government offices, 5 Buddhist temples, and the homes of 300 local government officials. In addition, they destroyed 7 police stations and a total of 48 public schools.

In addition to overt violence, the rioters also presented petitions to local authorities stating their demands. Common demands included repealing the Conscription Ordinance, abolishing public schools, rescinding the ban on traditional topknot hairstyles, and ditching the newly instated solar calendar in favor of the traditional lunar calendar.

== Suppression ==
The Meiji government brutally suppressed the blood tax riots without yielding to any of the rioters' demands. Showing no mercy, the government took a "shoot-to-kill" approach to the rioters. When local police forces proved unable to contain the violence, the government hired bands of samurai mercenaries to restore order. In total, more than 60,000 people were arrested, including more than 29,000 people in Okayama prefecture alone. However, a mere 15 rioters identified as ringleaders were sentenced to death and executed, with thousands of other rioters receiving lesser sentences or being released without charge.
