= Genrōin =

Japanese governing body

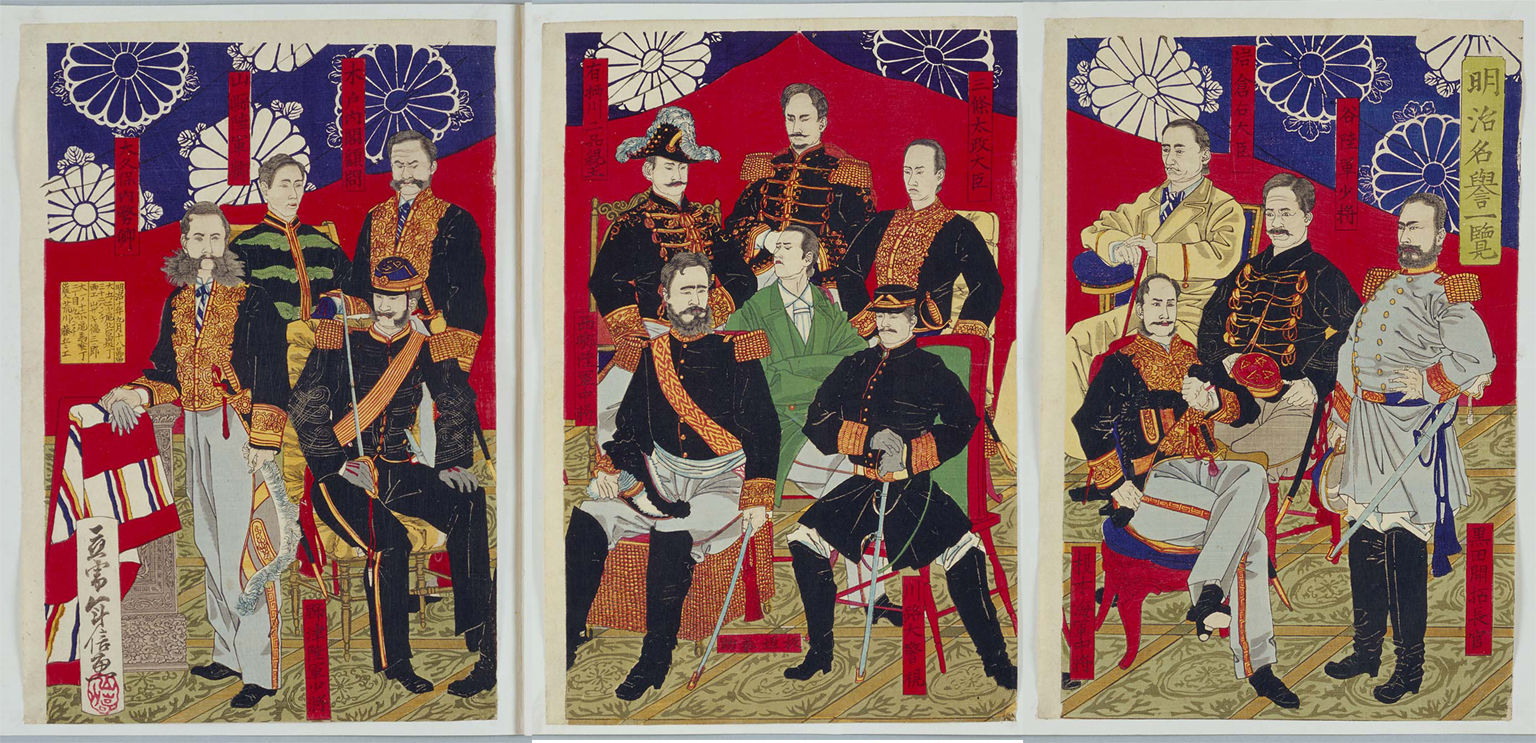
Woodblock print of the Genrōin

The Chamber of Elders (元老院, Genrōin) was a national assembly in early Meiji Japan, established after the Osaka Conference of 1875. It is also referred to as the Senate of Japan, Genrōin being the word used to describe the Roman Senate, and other western legislatures named after it.

The Freedom and People's Rights Movement and liberals among the Meiji oligarchy had withdrawn from the Meiji government over their efforts to establish a national assembly with increased representative democracy. The Osaka Conference of 1875 attempted to address this issue by the establishment of the Genrōin, a national assembly whose members (theoretically appointed directly by the Emperor) were drawn from the peerage, upper ranks of the bureaucracy and various scholars. The Genrōin was only quasi-legislative, in that it had the power to review proposed legislation and make recommendations, but did not have the power to actually initiate any legislation. As an assembly, it replaced the Chamber of the Left (左院, Sain).

In 1876, the Genrōin was given the task of drafting a constitution for Japan, which it completed in 1880, only to have the draft rejected by Itō Hirobumi and Iwakura Tomomi as being too liberal.

The Genrōin was replaced by the Imperial Diet in 1890.

The Genrōin should not be confused with the Genrō, or elder statesmen. Most of the Genrō were members of the Genrōin, but not all members of the Genrōin were Genrō.

== Chairman of the Genrōin ==
Chairman	Term start	Term end
Prince Arisugawa Taruhito (1835–1895)	18 May 1876	28 February 1880
Ōki Takatō (1841–1909)	28 February 1880	21 October 1881
Terashima Munenori (1832–1893)	21 October 1881	13 July 1882
Sano Tsunetami (1822–1902)	12 September 1882	22 December 1885
Count; Ōki Takatō (1841–1909)	22 December 1885	24 December 1889
Count; Yanagiwara Sakimitsu (1850–1894)	24 December 1889	20 October 1890
