= Prince Arisugawa Taruhito =

Japanese prince and general (1835–1895)

His Imperial Highness Taruhito Prince Arisugawa
- 有栖川宮熾仁親王
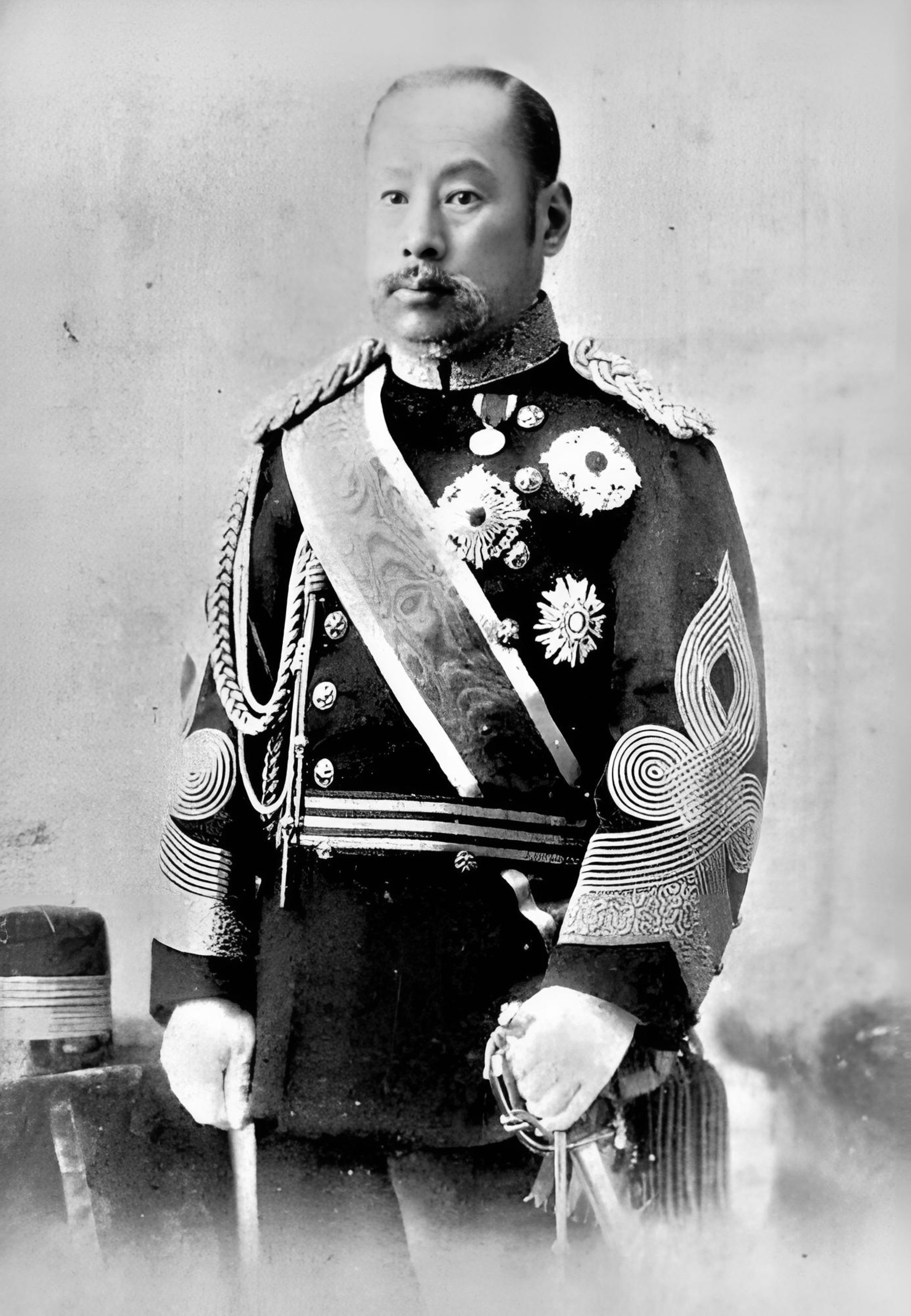

Chief of the Imperial Japanese Army General Staff
- In office 9 March 1889 – 15 January 1895
- Monarch: Meiji
- Preceded by: Ozawa Takeo
- Succeeded by: Prince Komatsu Akihito
- In office 22 December 1885 – 14 May 1888
- Monarch: Meiji
- Preceded by: Yamagata Aritomo
- Succeeded by: Ozawa Takeo

Personal details
- Born: 17 March 1835 Kyoto, Japan
- Died: 15 January 1895 (aged 59) Kobe, Japan
- Awards: Collar of the Supreme Order of the Chrysanthemum

Military service
- Allegiance: Empire of Japan
- Branch/service: Imperial Japanese Army
- Years of service: 1867–1895
- Rank: General
- Commands: Imperial Japanese Army
- Battles/wars: Boshin War; First Sino-Japanese War

Taruhito, Prince Arisugawa (有栖川宮熾仁親王, Arisugawa-no-miya Taruhito-Shinnō; March 17, 1835 – January 15, 1895) was a Japanese imperial prince and general in the Imperial Japanese Army. He was the 9th head of the Arisugawa-no-miya (有栖川宮家) line of shinnōke cadet branches of the Imperial Family of Japan from 1871.

Prince Arisugawa held several government and military offices during the Meiji era, such as commander of the Imperial Army during the Boshin War and the Satsuma Rebellion, president of the Genrōin, Minister of the Left and chief of the army general staff.

== Early life ==
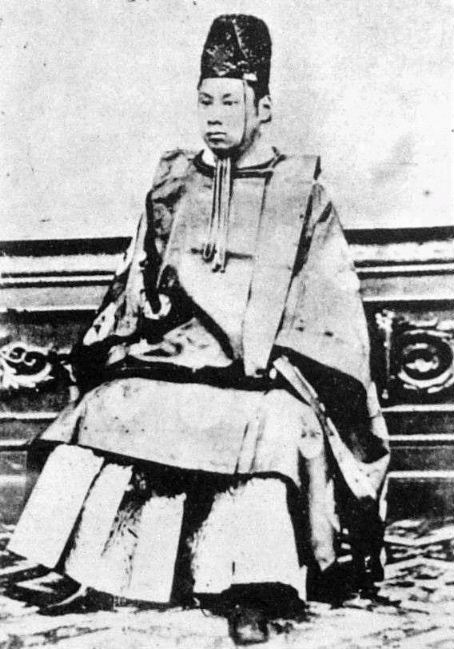
Prince Taruhito in his youth

Prince Arisugawa Taruhito was born in Kyoto in 1835, as the eldest son of Prince Arisugawa Takahito by Yūko (d. 1841), the eldest daughter of Saeki Yūjō. He was adopted by Emperor Ninkō as a potential heir to the throne, thus making Taruhito the adopted brother of Osahito Shinnō (the future Emperor Kōmei). Arisugawa was a close advisor to both Emperor Kōmei and his nephew by adoption, Emperor Meiji.

Prince Arisugawa became engaged to Princess Kazu-no-Miya Chikako, the eighth daughter of Emperor Ninkō, on August 8, 1861. However, the engagement was cancelled by the Tokugawa bakufu so that the princess could marry the shōgun Tokugawa Iemochi, thus politically sealing the reconciliation between the Shogunate and the Imperial Court.

Arisugawa's first wife Sadako (1850–1872) was the eleventh daughter of Tokugawa Nariaki, daimyō of Mito Domain. His second wife was Tadako (1855–1923), daughter of Count Mizoguchi Naohiro, the former daimyō of Shibata Domain. Neither of these marriages produced any children.

== Meiji Restoration ==
After Emperor Meiji succeeded to the throne in 1867, he appointed Prince Arisugawa Sōsai (a position equivalent to chief minister), and placed him in command of the Imperial Army sent to combat the forces of the Tokugawa bakufu in the Boshin War of 1868–1869. He fought at the Battle of Toba–Fushimi and later travelled up the Tōkaidō, to accept the surrender of Edo Castle on 3 May 1868, from his former fiancée Princess Kazu. In 1871 he was appointed governor of Fukuoka. Prince Arisugawa later led the Imperial Army against the forces of Saigō Takamori in the Satsuma Rebellion of 1877. He was given the rank of general in 1878.

From 1876 to 1880 he was the president of the Genrōin. From 1880 until the adoption of the Cabinet system in 1885, Arisugawa served as Minister of the Left (左大臣, Sadaijin). In 1882 he travelled to St. Petersburg, Russia, and met with Tsar Alexander III as the official envoy from Emperor Meiji.

From 1889 to 1895 the prince served as chief of staff of the Imperial Japanese Army and a member of the Supreme War Council. In that capacity, he was chief of staff to the Emperor in the Imperial General Headquarters after the outbreak of the First Sino-Japanese War in 1894. In September of that year, he was in charge of establishing the headquarters at Hiroshima Castle.

He contracted typhoid fever (or possibly malaria) and returned to the Arisugawa palace at Maiko near Kobe to recover, but he died there on 15 January 1895. On his death, Emperor Meiji awarded him the first ever Collar of the Supreme Order of the Chrysanthemum. He was accorded a state funeral in Tokyo on 29 January 1895. His half-brother, Prince Arisugawa Takehito, succeeded as the tenth head of the house of Arisugawa-no-miya.

== Legacy ==
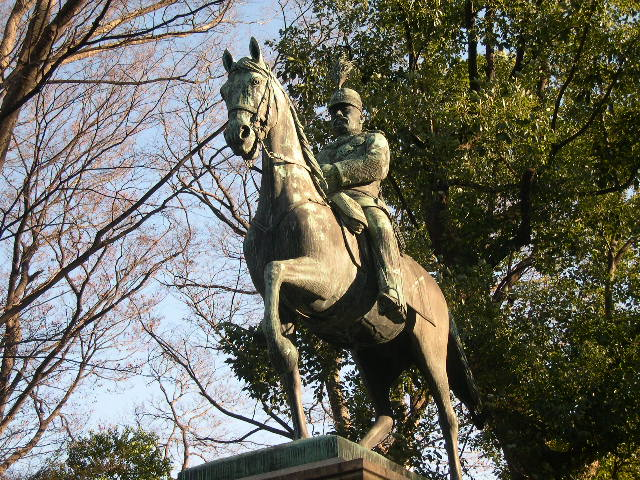
Statue of Prince Arisugawa Taruhito at the Arisugawa Memorial Park in Tokyo

The Arisugawa Memorial Park in Minami-Azabu, Minato, Tokyo occupies the site of the Arisugawa palace and its extensive gardens are open to the public. Although Imperial Prince Taruhito had intended to spend his last days in this palace, he died without ever occupying it. With donations by Ōyama Iwao, Saigō Tsugumichi and Yamagata Aritomo, a statue of the prince on horseback was made and erected in 1903 by the gate of the Imperial Japanese Army General Staff headquarters; it was moved to this park in 1962.
