= 維新 =

維新 can refer to:

== Events ==
- Meiji Restoration, an event that restored practical imperial rule in Japan
- Nippon Ishin no Kai, Japan Innovation Party (日本維新の会) is a Japanese right-wing nationalist political party
- Hundred Days' Reform (百日維新), reform effort in Qing dynasty China
- October Restoration (Korean: 시월유신, Hanja: 十月維新, RR: Siwol Yusin) or October Restoration was an October 1972 South Korean self-coup

== People ==
- Nisio Isin (西尾 維新) 1981), stylized NisiOisiN to emphasize the palindrome, is the pen name of a Japanese novelist and manga writer
- Duy Tân (1900–1945), born Nguyễn Phúc Vĩnh San, boy emperor of the Nguyen dynasty in Vietnam
- Three Great Nobles of the Restoration (維新の三傑):
  - Ōkubo Toshimichi of the Satsuma Domain (Satsuma-han)
  - Saigō Takamori of the Satsuma Domain (Satsuma-han)
  - Kido Takayoshi (also known as Katsura Kogorō) of the Chōshū Domain (Chōshū-han)

== Organizations ==
- Shishi (organization) (志士), sometimes known as Ishin Shishi (維新志士), were a group of Japanese political activists of the late Edo period
- Duy Tân Hội, was an anti-French and pro-independence society in Vietnam
- Duy Tan University

== States ==
- Reformed Government of the Republic of China (中華民國維新政府) was a Chinese puppet state established by the Empire of Japan
