= Kido Matsuko =

Japanese geisha

- 木戸 松子
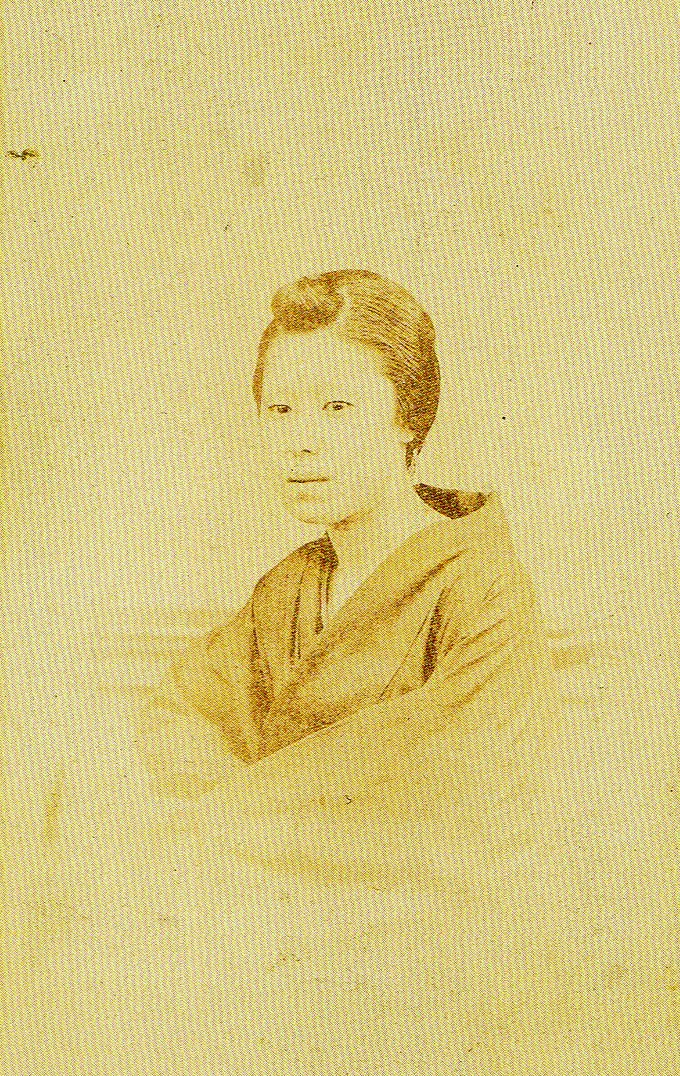
- Kido Matsuko in 1870
- Born: Kizaki Kei; November 22, 1843; Obama Domain, Wakasa Province, Japan
- Died: April 10, 1886 (aged 42); Kyoto, Kyoto Prefecture, Japan
- Resting place: Kyoto Ryozen Gokoku Shrine, Kyoto, Kyoto Prefecture, Japan
- Other names: Ikumatsu; Okabe Matsuko; Suikōin
- Occupations: nun, noblewoman, former geisha
- Era: Edo period, Meiji period
- Spouse: Kido Takayoshi (m. 1868; died 1877)
- Children: none
- Parents: Kizaki Ichibei (father); Hosokawa Sumi (mother)

Kido Matsuko (木戸 松子) (born Kizaki Kei (木崎 計); November 22, 1843 – April 10, 1886), later known as the nun Suikōin (翠香院), was a Japanese woman from the late Edo period to the Meiji period. She was formerly a geisha under the stage name Ikumatsu (幾松) from Sanbongi, Kyoto. She was the lover (and later the wife) of Katsura Kogorō (later Kido Takayoshi), who would go on to become one of the Three Great Nobles of the Restoration.
