= Chō Tsurahide =

Samurai

- 長 連豪
- Born: 1856; Anamizu, Noto Province, Kaga Domain, Japan
- Died: July 27, 1878 (aged 21–22); Ichigaya Prison, Tokyo, Empire of Japan
- Cause of death: decapitation
- Burial place: Yanaka Cemetery, Tokyo, Empire of Japan
- Relatives: Chō Renketsu (father)
- Military career
- Allegiance: Kaga Domain
- Known for: assassination of Ōkubo Toshimichi

Chō Tsurahide (長 連豪; 1856 – July 27, 1878) was a samurai from Ishikawa Prefecture who was instrumental in the assassination of Ōkubo Toshimichi during the Kioisaka incident.

== Background ==
Born in 1856 in Anamizu, Noto Province (present day Anamizu Town, Hōsu District, Ishikawa Prefecture), he was the son of Chō Renketsu, a retainer of the Kaga Domain. In his youth, he studied under the classical Chinese scholar Toyoshima Dōsai, and later attended Meirindō, the domain school of the Kaga Domain.

After Saigō Takamori began his uprising in Kagoshima Prefecture in 1877, Chō was among the first of the Kaga Domain (Kanazawa) figures with Shimada Ichirō and his Sanko-ji faction to enact anti-government plans. He traveled twice to Kagoshima Prefecture to meet Saigō, whom he held in high regard. Between 1873 and 1875, he spent a total of 14 months in Kagoshima, where he formed close friendships with Kirino Toshiaki and Beppu Shinsuke.

After Saigō's death during the Satsuma Rebellion in September 1877, the faction began plotting the assassinations on Kido Takayoshi and Ōkubo Toshimichi. Since Kido's earlier death of an illness on May 26, 1877 prior to the death of Saigō's, the focus shifted solely on Ōkubo.

On May 14, 1878 in Tokyo, Cho, Shimada, along with four other men, Sugimoto Otogiku (杉本 乙菊), Wakita Kōichi (脇田 巧一), Sugimura Bun'ichi (杉村 文一) and Asai Toshiatsu (浅井 寿篤), near Shimizudani at Kioichō (although the incident is commonly referred to as the "Kioisaka incident" the actual assassination did not take place on Kioisaka slope), ambushed Ōkubo Toshimichi's carriage which was on its way to the Imperial Palace, they first slashed the carriage horses' legs to stop the vehicle and killed Ōkubo's coachmen Nakamura Tarō. They dragged Ōkubo out of the carriage and cut his throat and left the body with their weapons and an explanatory note. They then turned themselves in to a nearby palace. All six men were executed by decapitation by the executioner Yamada Asaemon Yoshisuke in July of the same year.

Chō Tsurahide and his five associates were located at Yanaka Cemetery in Tokyo, where their grave headstones stood side by side.
