= Shimada Ichirō =

Japanese samurai

- 島田 一郎
- Shimada Ichiro
- Born: 1848; Kaga Domain, Japan
- Died: July 27, 1878 (aged 29–30); Ichigaya Prison, Tokyo, Empire of Japan
- Cause of death: decapitation
- Burial place: Yanaka Cemetery, Tokyo, Empire of Japan
- Military career
- Allegiance: Kaga Domain
- Branch: Imperial Japanese Army
- Rank: lieutenant
- Nickname: Western Dog
- Known for: assassination of Ōkubo Toshimichi
- Conflicts: First Chōshū expedition Battle of Hokuetsu

Shimada Ichirō (島田 一郎; 1848 – July 27, 1878) was a Japanese samurai who lived during the transition from the Edo period to the Meiji era. He is best known for his role in the assassination of Ōkubo Toshimichi during the Kioisaka incident.

== Background ==
Shimada Ichirō was born to an ashigaru in the Kaga Domain (presently Kanazawa), which was later part of the Ishikawa Prefecture by the Meiji government.

In 1864, he saw his first battle in the First Chōshū expedition. In 1868, following the Battle of Hokuetsu, he was promoted to the rank of okachinami (a mid-level foot soldier rank) the following year, in recognition of his contributions, which included securing provisions abandoned by the Nagaoka Domain.

Following the abolition of the domains and the establishment of prefectures, he pursued a career in the Imperial Japanese Army, studying French-style military science and rising to the rank of lieutenant, before eventually returning to his hometown.

During the periods surrounding the debates over a punitive military expedition of Joseon (Seikanron) in 1873 and the 1874 Japanese expedition to Taiwan, he traveled extensively and recruiting like-minded individuals to advocate for the military expedition of Joseon.

A group of disaffected former samurais among his sympathizers formed an anti-government faction called Sankō-ji, led by Shimada. As a leader of the faction, Shimada attempted to raise an armed force in coordination with the Hagi Rebellion and the Satsuma Rebellion, but ultimately abandoned the plan. Following the death of Saigō Takamori during the Satsuma Rebellion in September 1877, the faction began plotting the assassinations of high-ranking government officials Kido Takayoshi and Ōkubo Toshimichi to avenge Saigō. However, the passing of Kido earlier on May 26, 1877 before the death of Saigō shifted the focus solely on Ōkubo.

Shimada, along with Chō Tsurahide disappeared from Kanazawa in March 1878, keeping the central government on high alert. Shimada passed the headship to his eldest son and left his family with poetry, setting his motives and coming to terms with his demise by departing for Tokyo on April 15, 1878.

On May 14, 1878 in Tokyo, Shimada, Cho, along with four other men, Sugimoto Otogiku (杉本 乙菊), Wakita Kōichi (脇田 巧一), Sugimura Bun'ichi (杉村 文一) and Asai Toshiatsu (浅井 寿篤), near Shimizudani at Kioichō (although the incident is commonly referred to as the "Kioisaka incident" the actual assassination did not take place on Kioisaka slope), ambushed Ōkubo Toshimichi's carriage which was on its way to the Imperial Palace, they first slashed the carriage horses' legs to stop the vehicle and killed Ōkubo's coachmen Nakamura Tarō. They dragged Ōkubo out of the carriage and cut his throat and left the body with their weapons and an explanatory note. At the time of the assassination, Shimada had a handgun in his pocket, but he did not ended up using it.

Immediately after, they turned themselves in to a nearby palace. All six men were executed by decapitation by the executioner Yamada Asaemon Yoshisuke in July of the same year.

Shimada Ichirō and his five associates were located at Yanaka Cemetery in Tokyo, where their grave headstones stood side by side.
