= Ryozen Museum of History =

Museum in Kyoto, Japan

Coordinates: 34°59′56.2″N 135°46′57.5″E

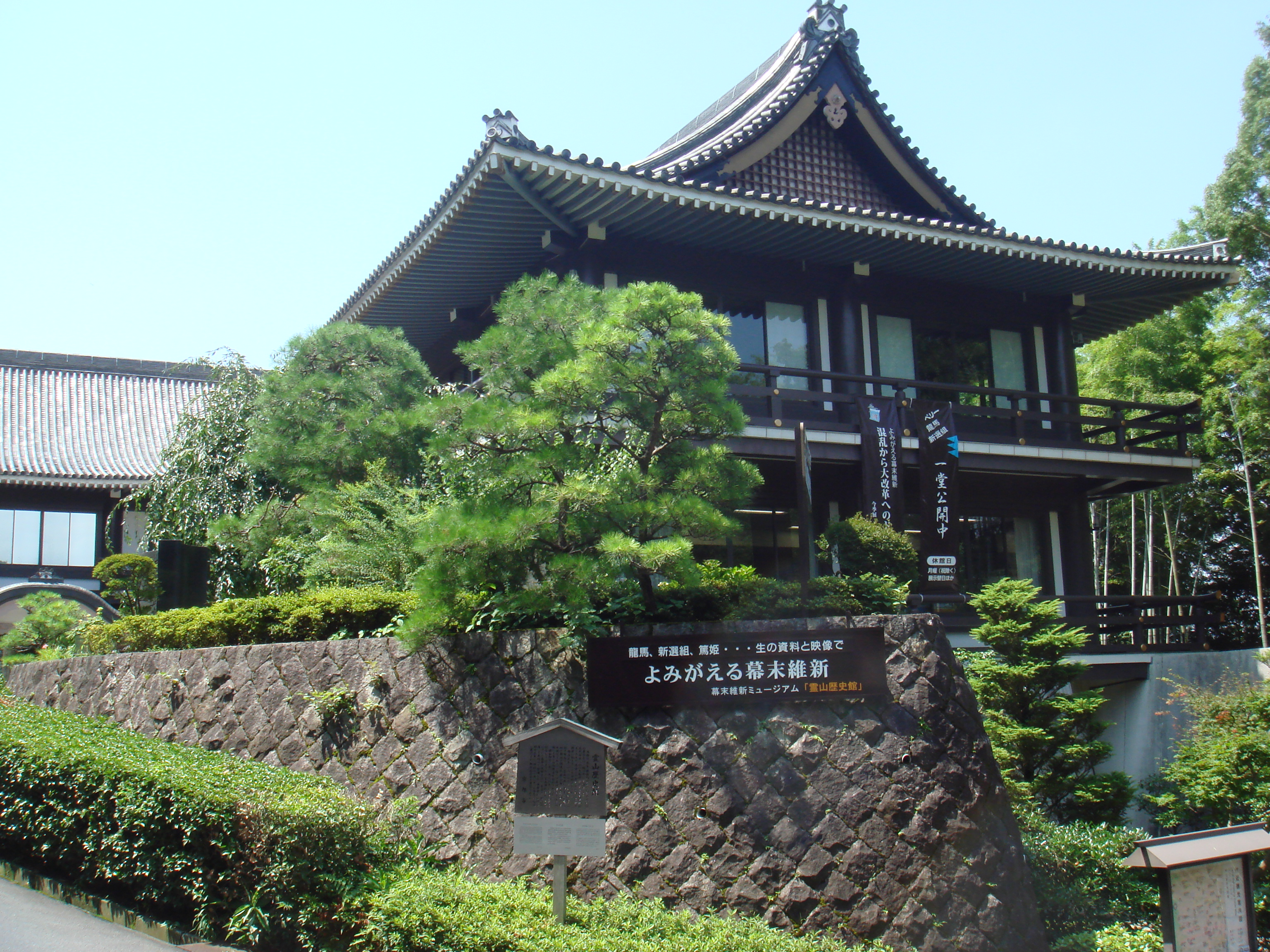
The Ryozen Museum of History.

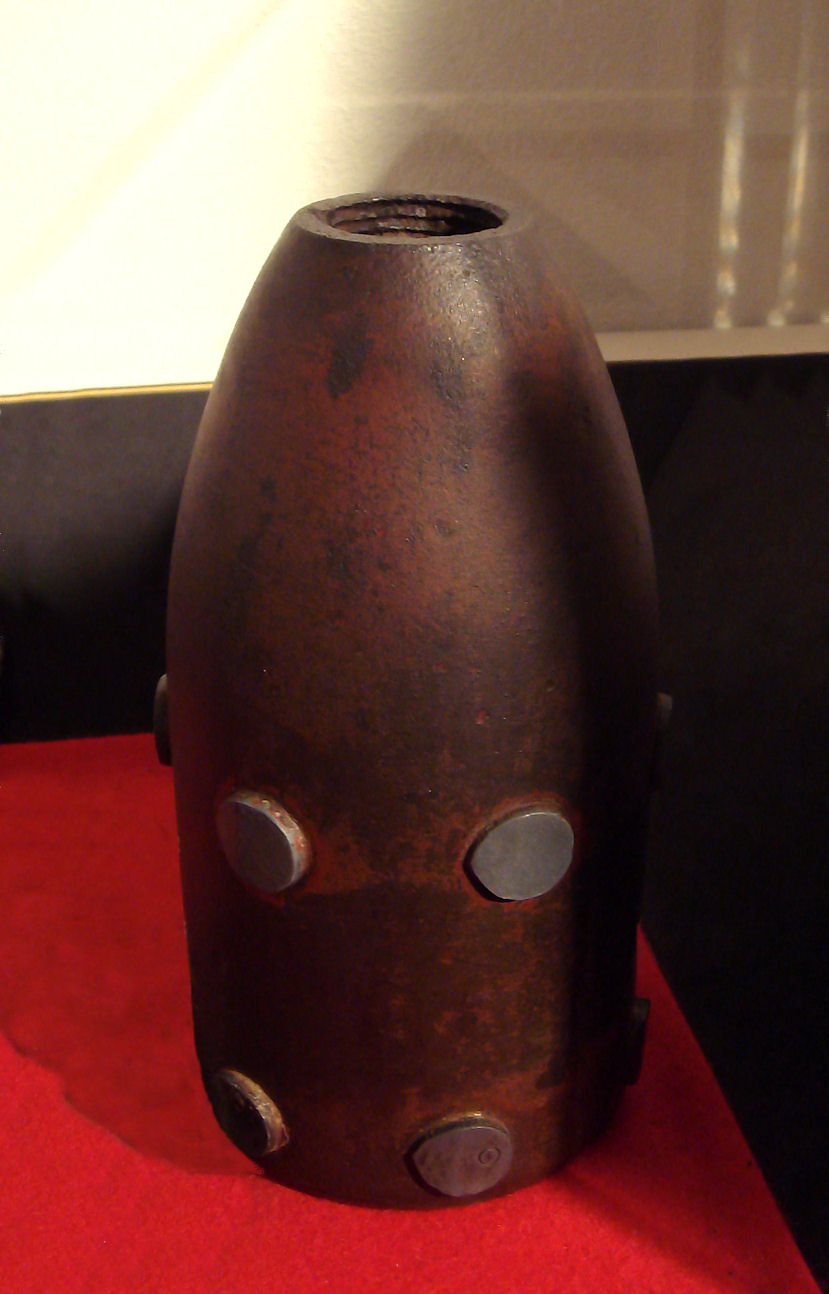
"Napoleon shell" from a Canon obusier de 12. Ryozen Historical Museum.

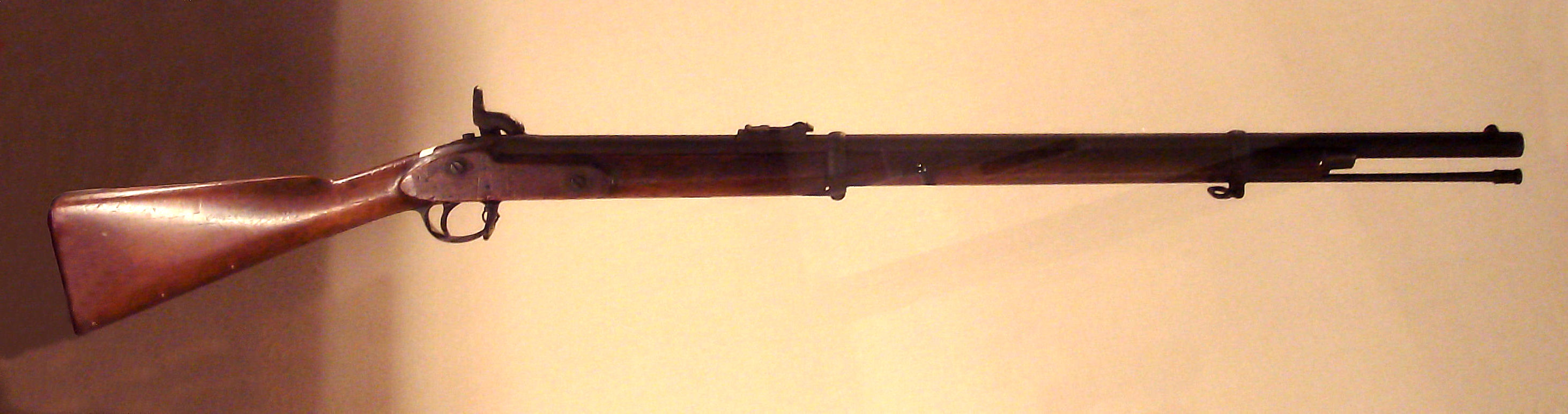
Japanese-produced Minié-type rifle

The Ryozen Museum of History (幕末維新ミュージアム 霊山歴史館, Bakumatsu Ishin Myūjiamu: Ryōzen Rekishikan) is a history museum located in Kyoto, Japan. It specializes in the history of the Bakumatsu period and the Meiji Restoration.

The Museum is next to the Kyoto Ryozen Gokoku Shrine.
