= Kyoto Ryozen Gokoku Shrine =

Shinto shrine in Kyoto, Japan

Kyoto Ryozen Gokoku Shrine (京都霊山護国神社, Kyōto Ryōzen Gokoku Jinja)
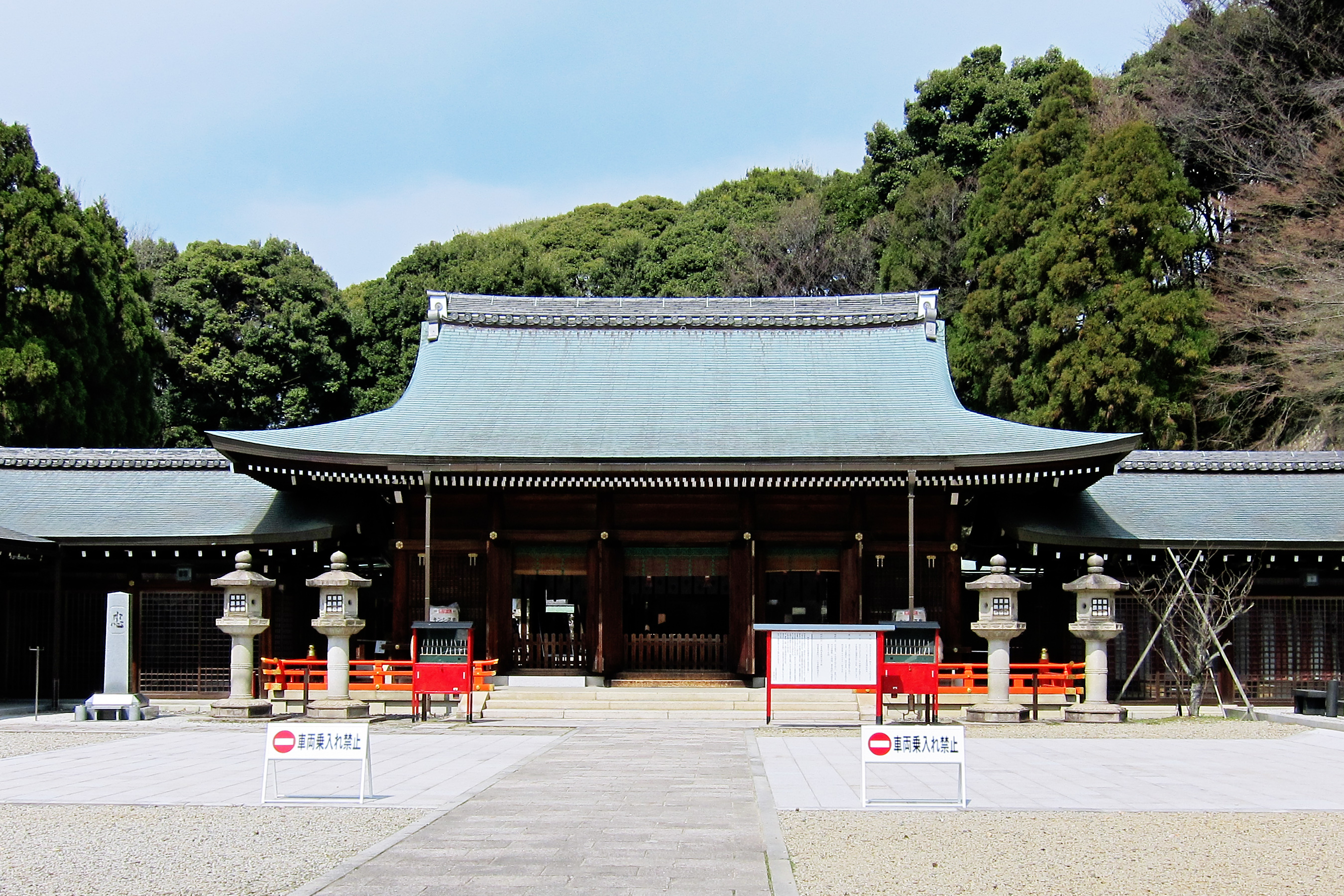
- Kyoto Ryozen Gokoku Shrine

- Location within Japan

Religion
- Affiliation: Shinto

Location
- Interactive map of Kyoto Ryozen Gokoku Shrine (京都霊山護国神社, Kyōto Ryōzen Gokoku Jinja)
- Coordinates: 35°00′00″N 135°46′59″E

Architecture
- Established: 1868

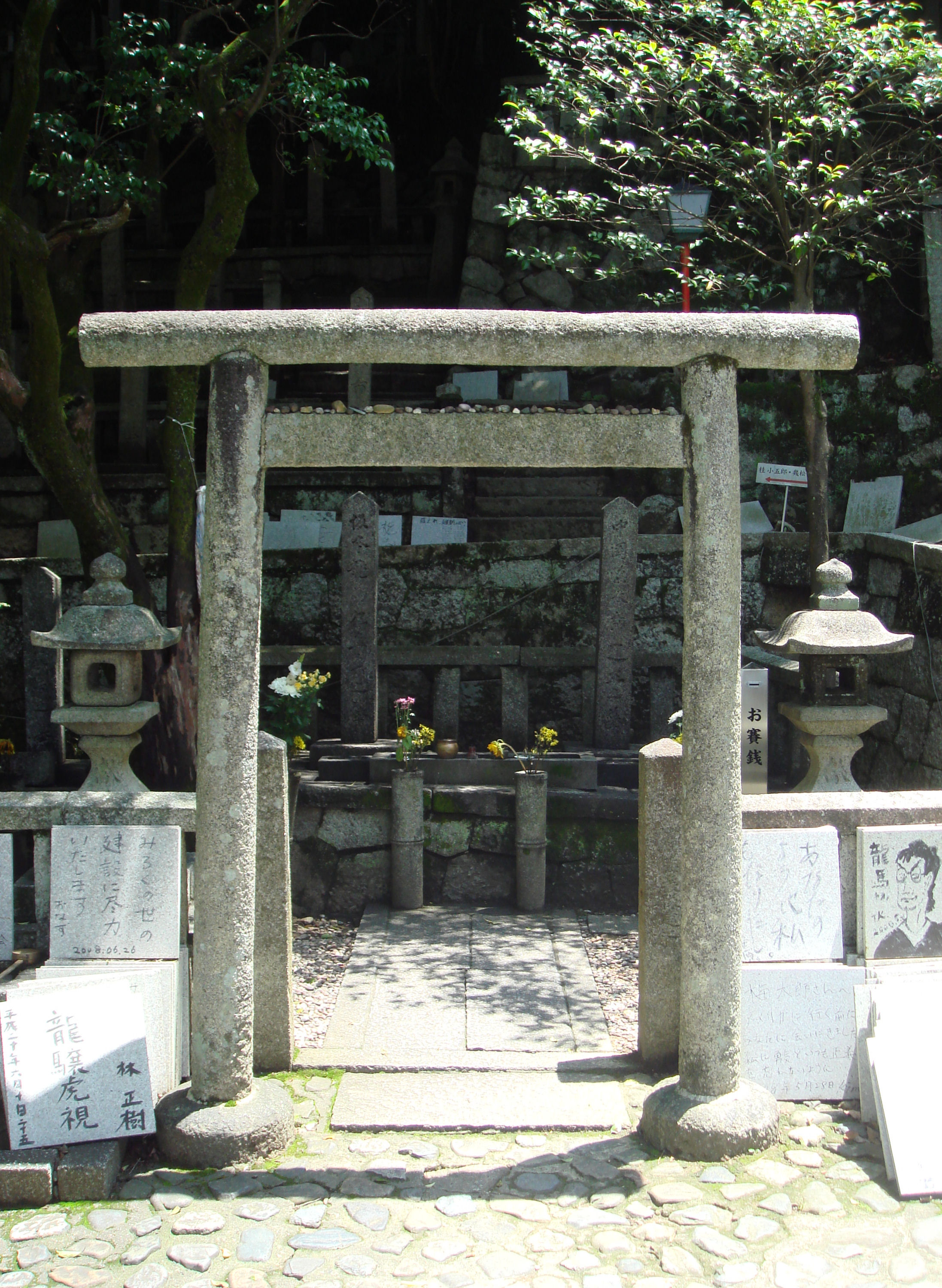
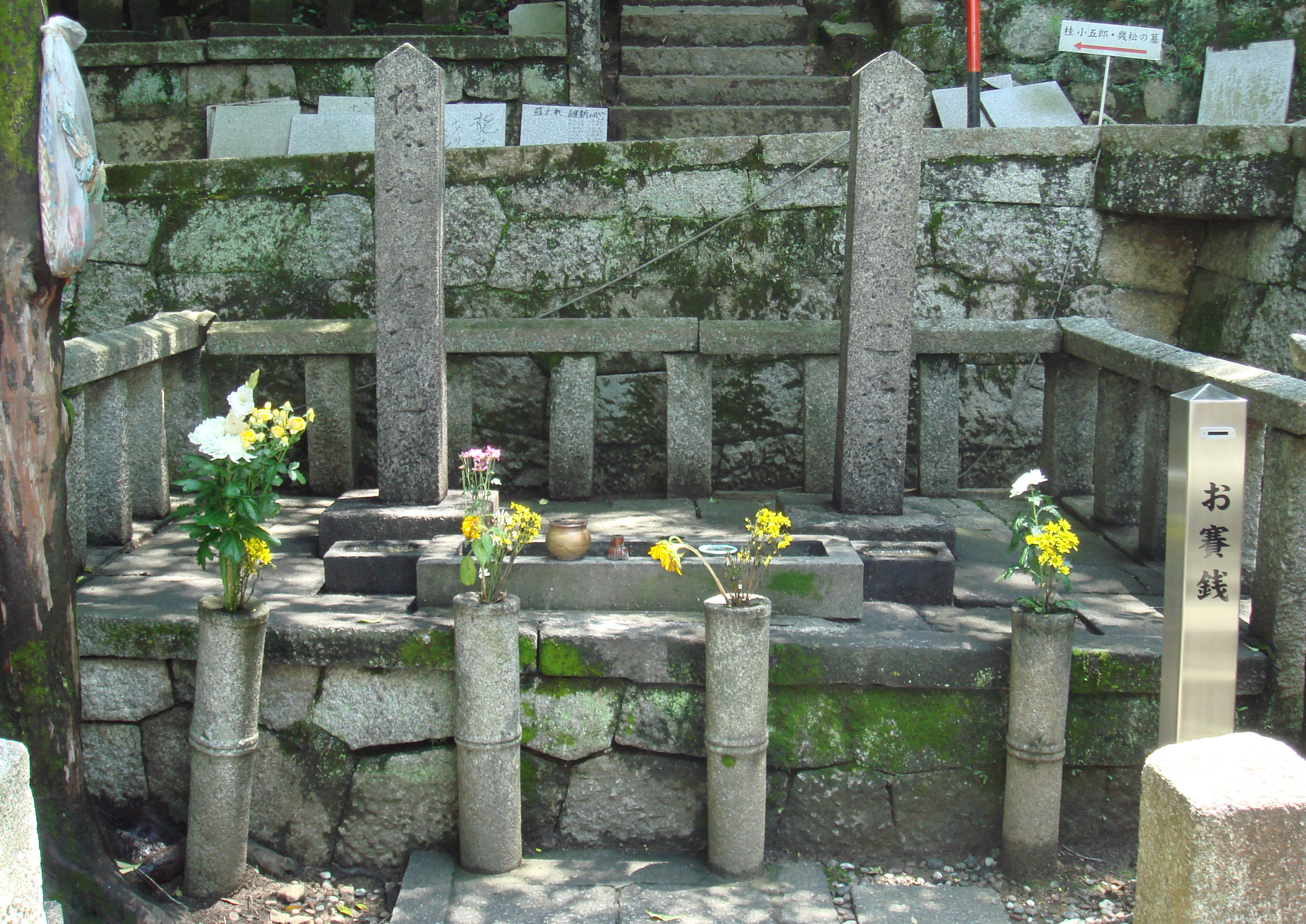
Left image: Tomb of Sakamoto Ryōma, in Kyoto Ryozen Gokoku Shrine, Kyoto.
Right image: Tomb of Sakamoto Ryōma (detail).

The Kyoto Ryozen Gokoku Shrine (京都霊山護国神社, Kyōto Ryōzen Gokoku Jinja) is a Shinto Shrine located in Kyoto, Japan. It honors the heroes of Japan, especially from the period of the Bakumatsu period and the Meiji Restoration, most famously Sakamoto Ryōma and his associate Nakaoka Shintarō, who are buried side by side in the shrine. Within the shrine is a monument in memory of the Indian jurist Radhabinod Pal.

The Ryozen Museum of History is next to this shrine.

== History ==
In 1862, a funeral was held by volunteers at the Shinto burial site Reimeisha in the red seal land (朱印地) of the Shohoji (正法寺) temple of the Ji-shu Ryozan school. There were 3 festival gods Kikurihime, Hayatama-no-Okami, and Susano Otomo.

On June 29, 1868, in order to worship the spirits of the Shishi (tenchu-gumi in order to enshrine a holy spirit etc) who fell from Emperor Meiji on the verge of the Meiji Restoration, a sacred area of a sacred mountain in Higashiyama Ward, Kyoto, a scholarship was issued to build the structure. The shrine was founded at the summit of Kyoto's Kuge (aristocratic class) and the feudal lords of Yamaguchi, Kochi, Fukui, Tottori, and Kumamoto. It has an older history than Yasukuni Shrine.

The original name of the company was called Ryozen Kansai Shokyoshasha, and the company name was especially "Kansaisha" which was repaired at national expense. In 1936 (Showa 11), there was a movement to carefully enshrine the national martyrs from Kyoto Prefecture who perished after the China Incident (支那事変) in the (Second Sino-Japanese War). The precincts were expanded and a new shrine was built.

On April 1, 1939 (Showa 14), the name of the company was changed to the current name of Kyoto Ryozen Gokoku Shrine by the Declaration of the Ministry of Home Affairs (内務大臣). After World War II, it was placed under the umbrella of a religious corporation and Association of Shinto Shrines, and left the state. During the GHQ occupation, it was renamed to Kyoto Shrine, but after Japanese independence it was restored to its original name. In 1970 (Showa 45), the Ryozen Museum of History was opened in the precincts to display materials related to the Meiji Restoration. In 2002, the comprehensive relationship with the Association of Shinto Shrines was dissolved.

Ryoma Sakamoto, who was assassinated in Kyoto, is also included in the deity, and a statue was built in the precincts. On November 15, in memory of Ryoma's virtues and comforting spirits The Ryoma Festival was held.

In addition to Ryoma, Kido Takayoshi, Shintaro Nakaoka, Rai Mikisaburo, Umeda Unpin, Torataro Yoshimura, Kuniomi Hirano, Kusaka Genzui, Takasugi Shinsaku, Ikutaro Tokoro, Miyabe Teizo, Shunzaburo Taoka (田岡俊三郎) and others, 1,356 pillars of the late Edo period. A total of about 73,000 pillars are worshiped as religious gods, including those who died during the First Sino-Japanese War, the Russo-Japanese War, and the World War II. Also, in April 2012, a statue of a kamikaze pilot was erected.

== Festivals ==
- Saitan Festival (new years festival) - January 1,～ three days
- Kigensetsu Festival (Emperor Jimmu's ascension to the throne) - February 11
- Spring Festival- April 28
- Oharae (大祓) (purification festival)
- Spirit Festival - August 13,～16th
- Autumn Festival- October 14
- Ryoma Festival- November 15
- Tencho Festival (The Emperor's Birthday) - December 23

== Showa Forest ==
In 1997 ( Heisei 9), "Showa no Mori" was established to commemorate the Great East Asian War (Pacific War). To commemorate the 50th anniversary of India's independence, there is a monument dedicated to India's representative judge, Radhabinod Pal, whose dissenting opinion at the International Military Tribunal for the Far East was that the accused were not guilty of war crimes.

== Transportation ==
- Take the Kyoto City Bus 80, 202, 206, 207 "Higashiyama Yasui" bus stop and walk 10 minutes.
- 15 minutes walk from Gion-Shijō Station on the Keihan Main Line.

== See also ==
- List of Shinto shrines in Japan
