= Ōkubo Toshimichi =

Japanese statesman (1830–1878)

- 大久保 利通
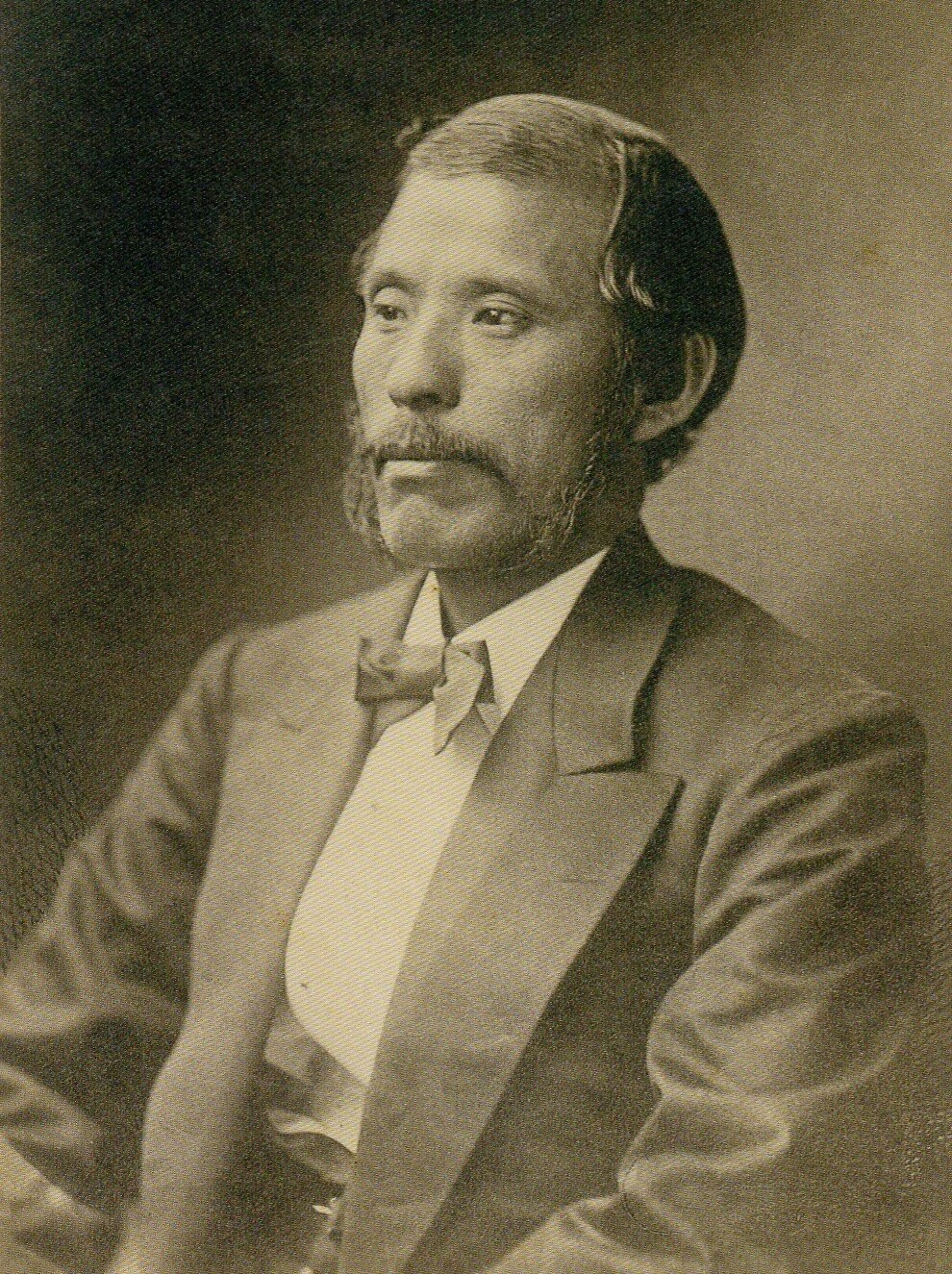
- Ōkubo in 1872

Lord of Home Affairs
- In office 28 November 1874 – 15 May 1878
- Monarch: Meiji
- Preceded by: Itō Hirobumi
- Succeeded by: Itō Hirobumi
- In office 27 April 1874 – 2 August 1874
- Monarch: Meiji
- Preceded by: Kido Takayoshi
- Succeeded by: Itō Hirobumi
- In office 29 November 1873 – 14 February 1874
- Monarch: Meiji
- Preceded by: Office established
- Succeeded by: Kido Takayoshi

Minister of Finance
- In office 27 June 1871 – 12 October 1873
- Monarch: Meiji
- Preceded by: Ōki Takatō
- Succeeded by: Ōkuma Shigenobu

Personal details
- Born: 26 September 1830 Kagoshima, Satsuma, Japan
- Died: 14 May 1878 (aged 47) Kioichō, Tokyo, Japan
- Cause of death: Assassination
- Resting place: Aoyama Cemetery
- Spouse: Hayasaki Masako (m. 1858)
- Children: 9, including Makino Nobuaki
- Occupation: Samurai, politician
- Known for: One of the three great nobles of the Meiji Restoration; Driving force of Japan's modernization; Key member of the Iwakura Mission

Ōkubo Toshimichi (大久保 利通; Japanese pronunciation: [ò̞ó̞.kɯ̈́.bó̞ | tò̞.ɕí.mʲì.c̟͡ɕì, -bó̞ tó̞-, ó̞ó̞-]; 26 September 1830 – 14 May 1878) was a Japanese statesman and samurai of the Satsuma Domain. Regarded as one of the main founders of modern Japan, he was one of the "Three Great Nobles" who led the Meiji Restoration in 1868, alongside Kido Takayoshi and Saigō Takamori. His policies, often characterized by realism and a focus on national strength (fukoku kyōhei), has led some historians to compare his role in Japan to that of Otto von Bismarck in Prussia.

Beginning his career as a low-ranking retainer in Satsuma, Ōkubo became a central figure in the movement to overthrow the Tokugawa shogunate, and following the restoration of imperial rule became a prominent leader in the new Meiji government. As a junior councilor and later in key ministerial posts, he was a principal architect of the new state, driving reforms that dismantled the old feudal structure. His most significant achievement in this period was the abolition of the han system in 1871, which centralized the country under the Tokyo government.

Ōkubo served as a vice-ambassador on the Iwakura Mission (1871–1873), touring the United States and Europe. The experience reinforced his belief that Japan must prioritize internal modernization before engaging in foreign ventures. Following his return, he successfully opposed a proposed invasion of Korea (Seikanron) in October 1873, thereby leading to a political split with his former ally Takamori. Upon being named Home Minister in November 1873, Ōkubo consolidated power to become the dominant figure within the Meiji oligarchy. Ōkubo then focused on a state-led industrialization drive and suppressed several samurai uprisings that challenged the central government, including the Saga and Satsuma Rebellions.

In 1878, Ōkubo was assassinated by a group of disaffected samurai who accused him of tyranny. While controversial for his authoritarian methods, Ōkubo is remembered for his political shrewdness and unwavering vision. His leadership during the turbulent early Meiji period was instrumental in transforming Japan from a feudal country into a modern, industrialised nation-state.

== Early life and education ==
Ōkubo Toshimichi was born on 26 September 1830, in Kajiyamachi, a section of the castle-town of Kagoshima in the Satsuma Domain. His father, Ōkubo Jūemon (also known as Toshio or Shirō), was a low-ranking samurai (koshōgumi, or bodyguard) of the Satsuma Domain, receiving less than 150 koku of rice annually, which kept the family in straitened circumstances until Jūemon obtained a minor position in the han government dealing with Ryukyuan affairs. Jūemon was a man of high spirits and unusual character, an egalitarian who associated widely with samurai, merchants, and peasants, and studied the philosophy of Oyōmei and Zen Buddhism. Ōkubo's maternal grandfather, Minayoshi Hōtoku, was a noted Satsuma physician who had studied Western technology and science, and was aware of Japan's maritime inadequacies.

As the only son in a family of seven, Ōkubo was reared in strict conformity with Satsuma samurai traditions. Between the ages of seven and fourteen, he attended the Gochū, a self-governing association for young boys in his district, peculiar to Kagoshima. These institutions guided young Satsuma lads in play, study, and military training, under the supervision of older youths (nisaishū). Activities at the Gochū were oriented toward fostering military courage and literary proficiency, including the practice of jūjutsu and reading Confucian classics, Japanese history, and literature. As the oldest son of a samurai, Ōkubo was also entitled to attend the Seidō (also known as Zōshikan), a han-operated educational institution. He undertook special training in military arts, studying jūjutsu under his uncle Minayoshi Kinroku and spear fighting under Umeda Kyūnojō, though his frail constitution prevented him from excelling.

To compensate for his physical limitations, Ōkubo concentrated on literary pursuits, becoming a voracious reader. He and his boyhood friend Saigō Takamori, who was three years his senior, studied Zen Buddhism and the Ōyōmei school of philosophy under teachers such as Itō Moemon and Musan Oshō. Zen, with its emphasis on direct intuitive perception and self-discipline, appealed to the samurai class. The Ōyōmei philosophy, which stressed introspection and rejected scriptural authority in favor of intuitive perception, also attracted many samurai intellectuals. At the age of sixteen, Ōkubo's literary accomplishments earned him a position as kakiyakujo (archivist's aide) in the Satsuma han's archives.

In 1849, Ōkubo's father, Jūemon, a loyalist and member of the reform party in the han, participated in a movement to oust reactionary advisers surrounding the daimyō Shimazu Narioki and to support Narioki's legitimate son, Shimazu Nariakira, as successor over the illegitimate Saburō (later Shimazu Hisamitsu). This "family conflict," known as the Takasaki Uprising or Oyura Sōdō, resulted in the capture and punishment of many reformers. Jūemon was exiled to Okinoerabujima. Ōkubo Toshimichi himself, accused of acting as a messenger between his father and other conspirators, was relieved of his position in the archives and placed under domiciliary arrest for six months. This period, from 1849 to 1853, was one of dire poverty for the Ōkubo family.

== Rise in Satsuma ==
The fortunes of the Ōkubo family and the progressive faction in Satsuma improved when, in 1851, Shimazu Nariakira became the new head of the Satsuma han, following the forced resignation of Narioki. Nariakira was an active reformer interested in Western learning who initiated widespread reforms to improve the han's government and military defense, establishing an arsenal and a navy yard. His foreign policy was kaikoku-teki jōi (opening the country to gain strength, then expelling foreigners), aiming for fukoku kyōhei (rich country, strong defense) on a local scale.

Nariakira recognized Ōkubo's talents. In 1853, Ōkubo was pardoned and reassigned to the archives. His father returned from exile in 1855. In 1858, both Ōkubo and Saigō were advanced to the rank of kachi metsuke (inspector). Shortly thereafter, Ōkubo was made a kura yaku, responsible for managing tribute rice, a position Nariakira established to improve the Ōkubo family's finances.

Despite his gratitude to Nariakira, Ōkubo and other young radicals were dissatisfied with the lord's failure to dismiss conservative advisers like Shimazu Bungo. They planned to work through the Bakufu (Tokugawa military government) to remove these advisers, but Nariakira, prioritizing han stability and influenced by his reactionary father Narioki, opposed the move. Ōkubo, respecting Nariakira, checked his more reckless colleagues. Ōkubo shared Nariakira's kinnō (reverence for the emperor) views and his advocacy of kōbu gattai (union of court and Bakufu), which aimed to maintain the traditional political dualism but with greater emphasis on the emperor's role.

Nariakira's death in August 1858 was a significant setback for the progressives. Ōkubo and Saigō found themselves without employment. Saigō, depressed, attempted suicide with the monk Gesshō; Ōkubo, however, persuaded Saigō to abandon further such plans, demonstrating a persistent character. The adversities of this period are said to have transformed Ōkubo into a serious, determined, and calculating reformer.

== Champion of the Restoration ==
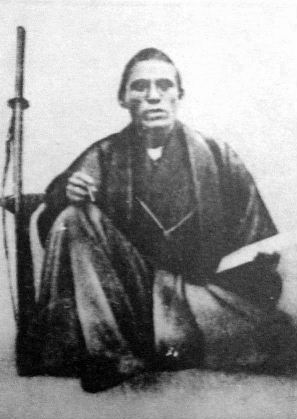
Ōkubo as a young samurai

Following Nariakira's death, Ōkubo and other Satsuma samurai resolved to take matters into their own hands, planning to leave the han as rōnin to attack the Kyoto Shoshidai, remove the kampaku Kujō, and assassinate Ii Naosuke, the Bakufu's chief minister, thereby forcing a complete reformation of the Bakufu. Saigō, then on his way to exile on Ōshima, advised immediate action. Ōkubo formed a party of loyalists, recommending Iwashita Hōhei as leader due to his higher social status. He secured financial backing from Moriyama Shinzō (Tōen), a Kagoshima gōshi (farmer-samurai) turned merchant.

However, the Satsuma daimyō Shimazu Tadayoshi, influenced by his father Hisamitsu, discouraged the radical move in November 1859, urging the group (which then called itself the Seichū Gumi or Loyal Party) to wait. Ōkubo, now leaning towards kōbu gattai with the court predominant over the Bakufu, advocated patience. His reluctance to act independently of the han, despite earlier radicalism, stemmed from factors including Ii Naosuke's power and a noted change in Hisamitsu's attitude, who began showing willingness to aid the loyalist cause. Ōkubo sought to win Hisamitsu's sympathy, employing subterfuge such as learning go from Jōgan, a priest and Hisamitsu's regular opponent, to gain access and convey his political views.

The assassination of Ii Naosuke on 24 March 1860, by Mito and Satsuma rōnin (the Sakuradamon Incident) intensified political instability. Ōkubo, now an okonando (senior attendant) and a powerful figure in Satsuma, used his influence to promote han reforms, including the abolition of outer castles (dejō) to centralize the domain. In 1862, Ōkubo was instrumental in arranging for Hisamitsu to lead Satsuma troops to Kyoto to persuade the court to give Satsuma an imperial mandate to reorganize the Bakufu. This period saw a growing rift between Ōkubo and Saigō, who held more extreme views on extending imperial prerogatives. Ōkubo, now closer to Hisamitsu, favored a more moderate approach.

Hisamitsu's mission to Kyoto led to the Teradaya Incident in May 1862, where Satsuma loyalists planning radical action were suppressed by Hisamitsu's orders, with Ōkubo involved in dealing with the aftermath. Subsequently, Hisamitsu, accompanied by Ōkubo, proceeded to Edo with an imperial mandate for Bakufu reforms. Through forceful negotiations, in which Ōkubo played a key role by intimidating Bakufu officials, major concessions were won: Tokugawa Keiki was appointed guardian to the shōgun, and Matsudaira Yoshinaga became chief minister. The Richardson Affair in September 1862, where Englishmen were attacked by Satsuma samurai near Yokohama, further complicated matters. The subsequent British bombardment of Kagoshima in August 1863, which Ōkubo witnessed, profoundly affected his thinking, convincing him of Western military superiority and the need for Japan to modernize rapidly.

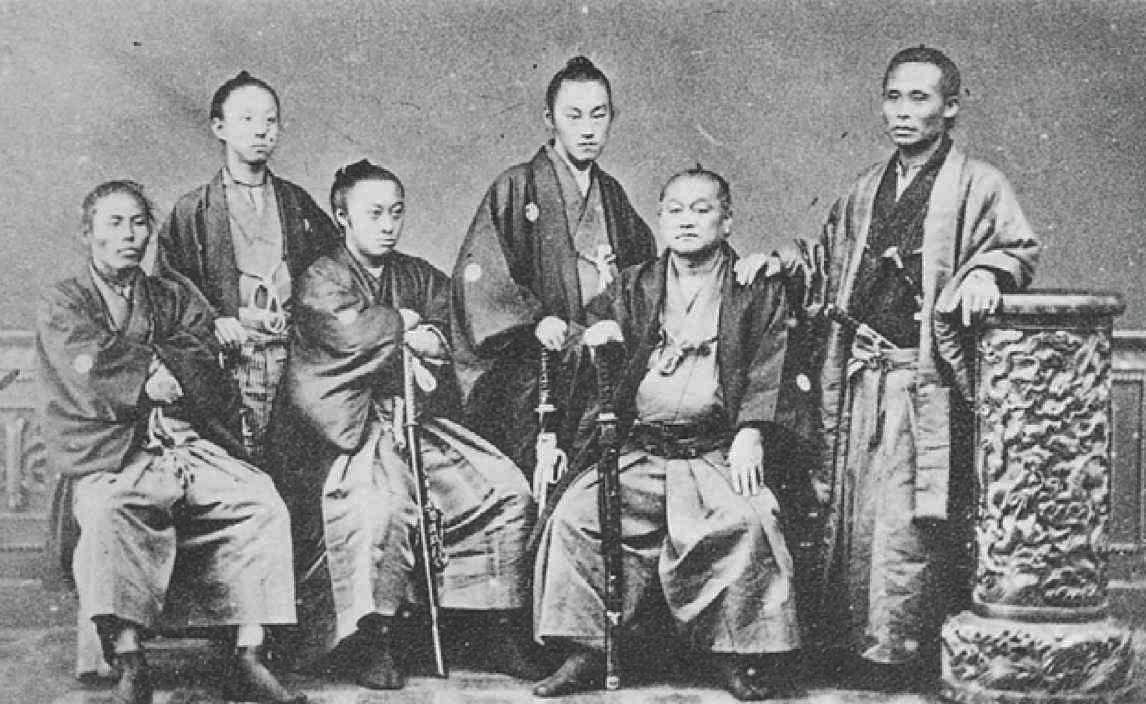
Samurai of the Chōshū and Satsuma Domains in 1869, with Ōkubo on the far-right, and Itō Hirobumi on the far-left

Ōkubo's policy shifted from kōbu gattai to hambaku (opposition to the Bakufu) and finally to tōbaku (overthrow of the Bakufu). He worked closely with the court noble Iwakura Tomomi to secure a court authorization for striking down the shogunate. He was central to the coup d'état of 3 January 1868 (Japanese calendar: Keiō 3, 12th month, 9th day), which proclaimed the restoration of imperial rule. In the newly formed government, Ōkubo, as a sangi (junior councilor), held significant power. He played a decisive role in the Boshin War, and after the defeat of the shogunate forces at the Battle of Toba–Fushimi, he argued for sparing Keiki's life, a compromise that was accepted.

== Career in the Meiji government ==
Ōkubo was a principal architect of the new Meiji state, working almost single-handedly during the critical period from 1868 to 1871 to consolidate the government. Ōkubo's political philosophy was pragmatic and centered on strengthening the Japanese state. He was a gradualist regarding constitutional government, believing Japan was not yet ready for full democracy. In an 1873 paper, he advocated for a limited monarchy based on a constitution, where ultimate power would be shared between the ruler and the people, but with the Emperor retaining significant authority. His concept of an assembly was primarily consultative. While he employed authoritarian methods, his goal was national survival and modernization, making him a key figure in establishing the foundations for a modern, centralized Japan, rather than a simple defender of absolutism. His economic philosophy was centered on fukoku kyōhei, with strong government patronage for industrial development to ensure national strength.

=== Early reforms and establishment of Tokyo ===
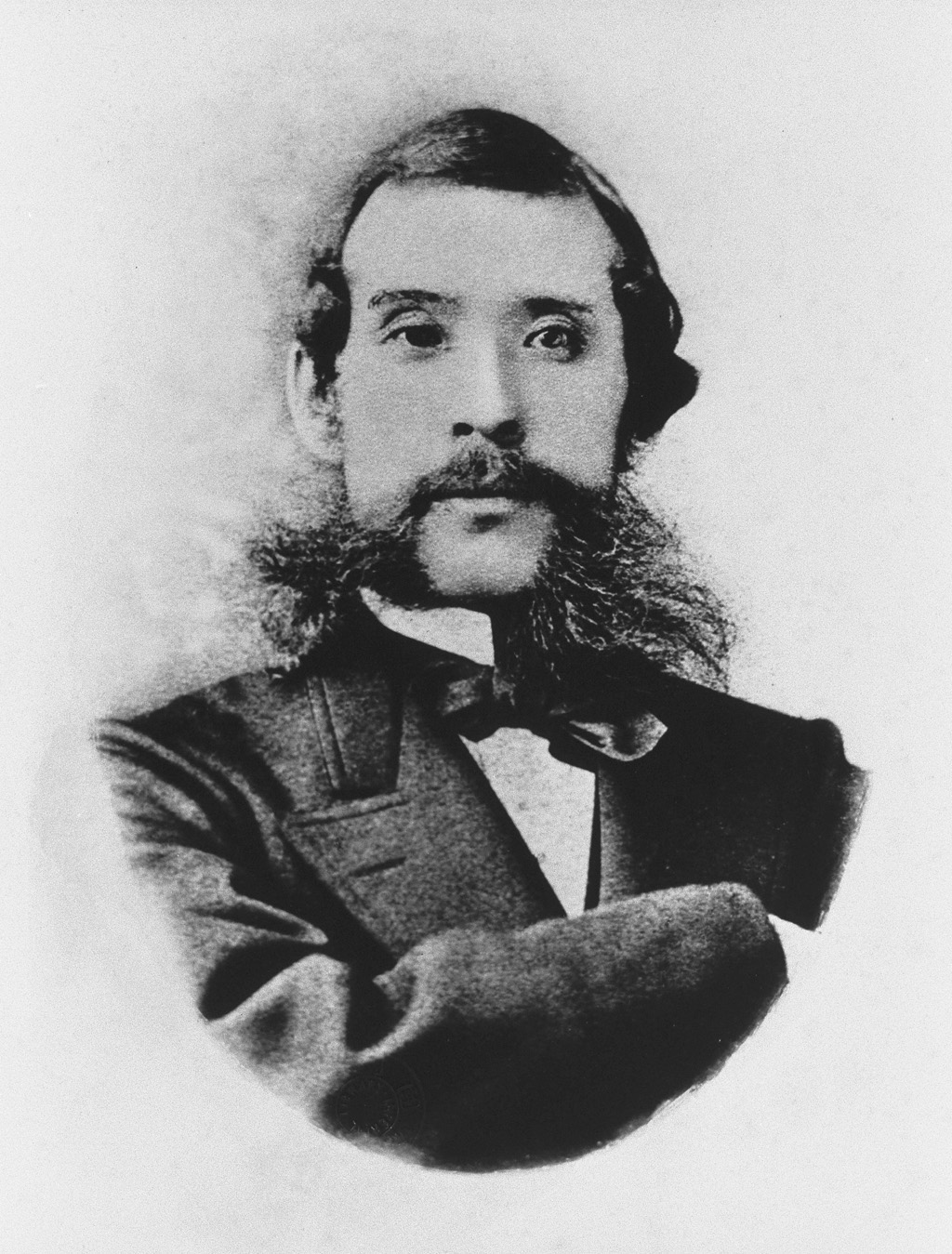
Ōkubo Toshimichi

To inspire confidence in the new administration, Ōkubo arranged a military review of coalition han troops in Kyoto in January 1868. He accepted a post in the Home Affairs department within the Shichika (Seven Offices) administrative structure established in February 1868. Ōkubo advocated the transfer of the imperial capital from Kyoto. He first proposed Osaka, partly to remove the court from undesirable influences. Despite opposition, the Emperor moved to Osaka temporarily. After the surrender of Edo Castle in May 1868, Ōkubo pressed for the former shogunal capital to become the new imperial seat. Edo was renamed Tokyo in September 1868, and the Emperor made it his permanent abode in the spring of 1869. The move was logical due to Edo's existing infrastructure, strategic location, and human resources.

Ōkubo had a limited role in drafting the Charter Oath (April 1868), a fundamental statement of policy for the new government, though he supported it as a means to unite the nation and secure financial backing for the government.

=== Abolition of feudalism ===
A major step towards centralization was the hanseki hōkan (return of the land and population registers by the daimyō to the Emperor). Kido Takayoshi initiated the idea, and Ōkubo, despite initial hesitation about the timing, eventually supported it, recognizing its necessity for imperial rule. In March 1869, Satsuma, Chōshū, Tosa, and Hizen offered their fiefs to the Emperor, and other han followed. The daimyō were reappointed as chihanji (imperial governors) of their former domains.

Ōkubo's primary interest shifted to improving the quality of government personnel. He advocated sending promising kuge and samurai abroad to study, leading to the dispatch of figures like Saionji Kinmochi. He also focused on reforming the Satsuma han government to bring it into closer alignment with the central government. The culmination of these efforts was the haihan chiken (abolition of han and establishment of prefectures) in August 1871. This decisive move, largely orchestrated by Ōkubo, Kido, and Saigō, dismantled the feudal structure and brought the entire country under direct central government control. Regular han troops were disbanded, and token forces remained. Ōkubo's role as the "master schemer" and "resolute tactician" was crucial to this reform.

=== Iwakura Mission and domestic policy ===
Members of the Iwakura Mission in San Francisco, 1872. From left: Kido Takayoshi, Yamaguchi Naoyoshi, Iwakura Tomomi, Itō Hirobumi, and Ōkubo.

Ōkubo was a key member of the Iwakura Mission (1871–1873), which toured the United States and Europe as a vice ambassador. Its primary aim was to sound out treaty powers on revising the unequal treaties, though it failed in this objective. A secondary objective was to observe Western culture and institutions. Ōkubo took his two sons, Hikonoshin and Nobukuma, to enroll them in Western schools. He was deeply impressed by British industrial progress and particularly by his meeting with Otto von Bismarck in Prussia in March 1873. Bismarck's emphasis on national strength and Realpolitik reinforced Ōkubo's own convictions about the path Japan should follow. After attempts to initiate treaty revision in the United States proved premature, Ōkubo and Itō Hirobumi had to be sent back to Japan to obtain the proper credentials, delaying the mission for four months.

During Ōkubo's absence, the caretaker government, influenced by Saigō Takamori, moved towards a military expedition against Korea (Seikanron). Upon his return in May 1873, Ōkubo, along with Kido (who had also returned changed by his experiences abroad), strongly opposed the Korean venture. The ensuing conflict was not merely about foreign policy, but represented a struggle between military expansionists led by Saigō and state-building bureaucrats led by Ōkubo and Kido. Ōkubo argued passionately that Japan's priority must be internal development and modernization (naichi dai-ichi shugi ron) before embarking on foreign adventures. His seven-point memorial detailed the risks of war, including civil disturbances, economic bankruptcy, depletion of gold reserves, Russian and English interference, and diversion from treaty revision. The ensuing debate led to a government crisis in October 1873, resulting in the resignation of Saigō and his supporters. The split prompted other leaders who had also left the government, such as Itagaki Taisuke, to begin a popular movement for a national assembly. Concerned that a government unchecked by law gave only an illusion of strength and that arbitrary rule invited popular revolt, Ōkubo privately circulated his views on establishing a constitution in late 1873.

=== Home Minister and modernization drive ===
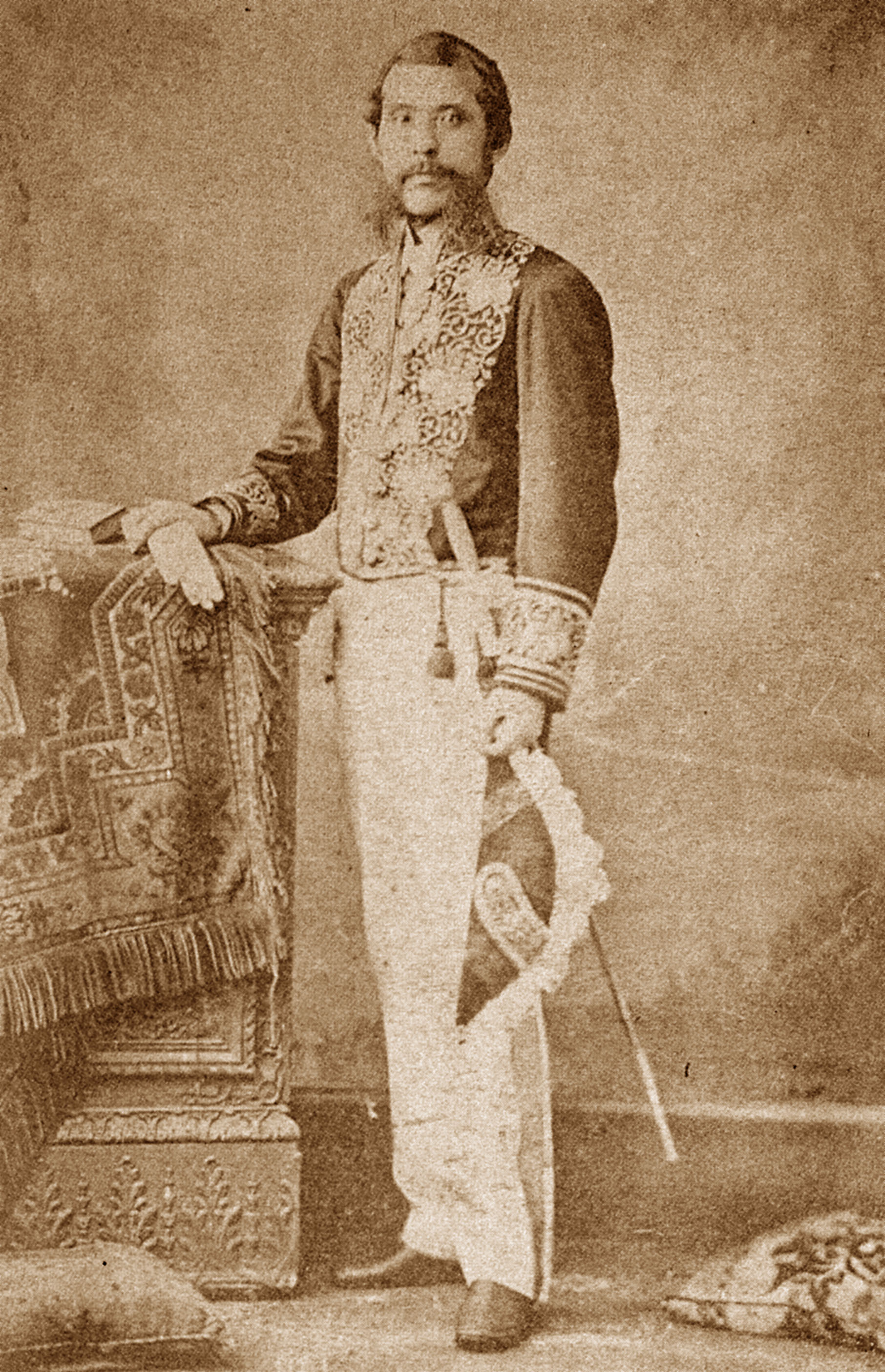
Ōkubo Toshimichi

Ōkubo assumed the post of Home Minister (Naimu-kyō) on 29 November 1873, a newly established ministry that became the "heart and center of the domestic bureaucracy." From this position, Okubo emerged as the dominant figure within the Meiji regime. The Home Ministry had two main bureaus: the keihōryō (police bureau) for civil control and the kangyōryō (industrial promotion bureau). Before leaving on the Iwakura Mission, Ōkubo had put Matsukata Masayoshi in charge of a new Bureau of Industrial Production. As Home Minister, he championed a policy of government-led industrialization (shokusan kōgyō), drawing on England's mercantilist past. He established agricultural schools (such as the Komaba Agricultural School, precursor to Tokyo University of Agriculture), experimental stations (like the Mita agricultural experimental station and the Shinjuku stock-breeding center), promoted the textile industry (wool and silk filatures), and supported the shipping industry, notably the Mitsubishi Kaisha.

He was also responsible for suppressing dissent. After the Saga Rebellion (January–March 1874), led by Etō Shinpei, Ōkubo personally directed its suppression, demonstrating his willingness to use force.

=== Formosan Expedition ===
The Formosan Expedition of 1874 presented another major crisis. After Ryukyuan sailors were killed by Taiwanese aborigines in 1871, Japan sought redress. Ōkubo, initially focused on internal affairs, was pressured into supporting a punitive expedition, partly as a diversion for disaffected samurai. Despite foreign protests (particularly British and American) and Kido's resignation over the issue, Ōkubo sanctioned the expedition led by Saigō Tsugumichi in May 1874. When China protested, Ōkubo traveled to Peking in August 1874 as minister plenipotentiary. Through tense negotiations, skillfully using foreign diplomats (especially British minister Thomas Wade) as intermediaries, Ōkubo secured a settlement in October 1874. China recognized Japan's action as just and paid an indemnity, implicitly acknowledging Japan's suzerainty over the Ryukyu Islands.

=== Later years and challenges ===
The Osaka Conference of 1875 was initiated by Ōkubo and Itō Hirobumi to bring Kido and Itagaki Taisuke back into the government and achieve a coalition. The compromise resulted in the establishment of the Genrōin (Senate), the Daishin-in (Supreme Court), and the Conference of Prefectural Governors, steps towards a more representative government, though Ōkubo ensured that real power remained with the Dajōkan. However, Ōkubo also authored restrictive press and libel laws in June 1875 to curb criticism of the government.

Continued samurai discontent culminated in the Satsuma Rebellion (1877), led by Saigō Takamori. Ōkubo, as the central figure in the government, directed the suppression of the rebellion, which, though costly, ultimately crushed the last major feudal resistance to the Meiji regime. He viewed the rebellion as a great misfortune but was grateful it occurred when the government was strong enough to handle it.

== Assassination ==
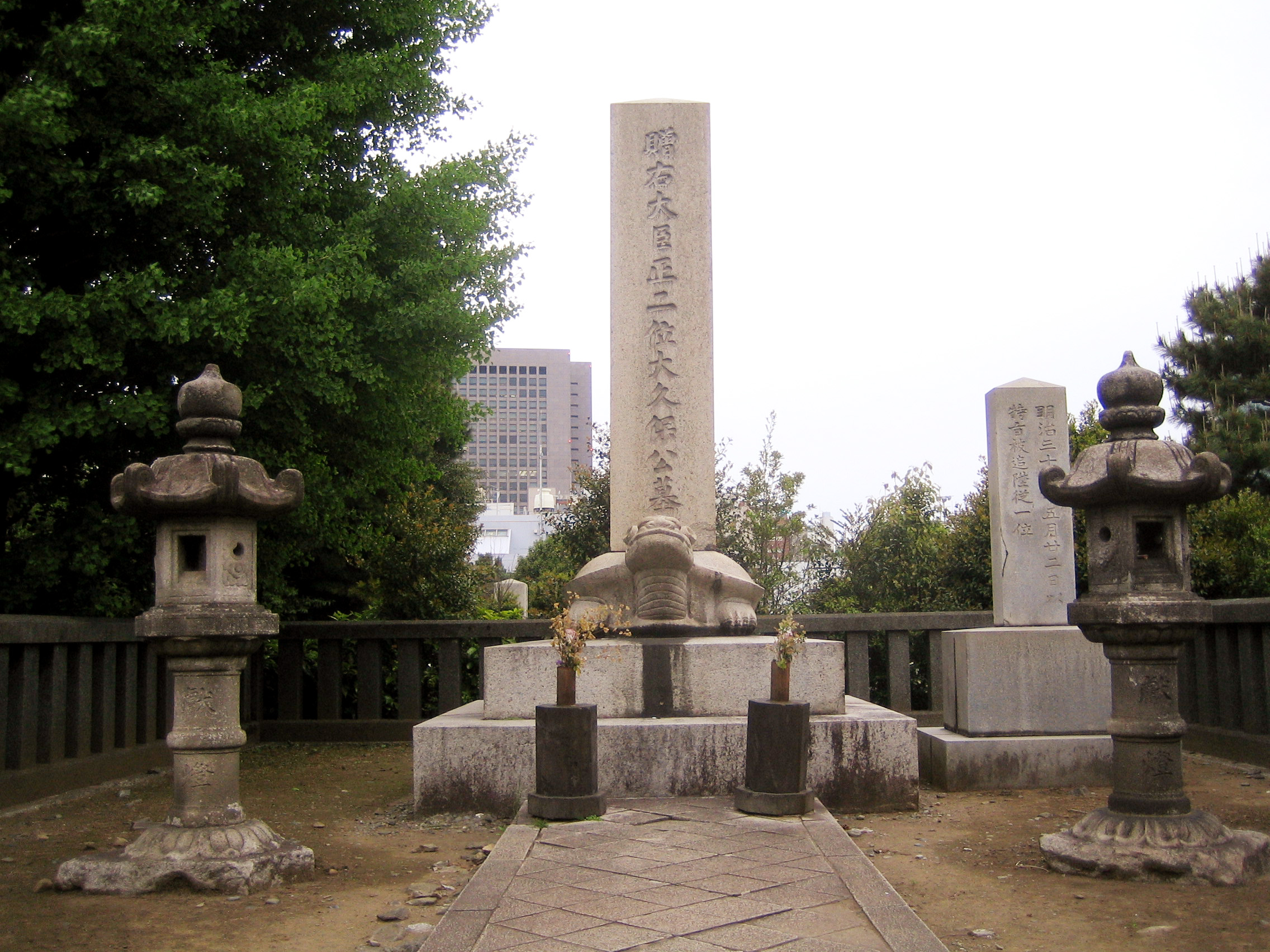
Ōkubo's grave in Aoyama Cemetery, Tokyo

On 14 May 1878, the carriage which carried Ōkubo Toshimichi was ambushed near Shimizudani at Kioichō, Tokyo (although the incident is commonly referred to as the "Kioisaka incident" the actual assassination did not take place on Kioisaka slope) in Tokyo by six disaffected samurais Shimada Ichirō, Chō Tsurahide, Sugimoto Otogiku, Wakita Kōichi, Sugimura Bun'ichi and Asai Toshiatsu from Ishikawa and Shimane prefectures while on its way to the Imperial Palace. The assassins first slashed the carriage horses' legs to stop the vehicle and killed Ōkubo's coachman Nakamura Tarō. Ōkubo was then dragged out of the carriage and was assassinated with his throat cut.

The assassins left his body with their weapons and an explanatory note, justified their deed by charging Ōkubo with suppressing popular rights, monopolizing administrative affairs, promulgating laws arbitrarily, depleting the national treasury, fomenting disorders, and prejudicing Japan's national rights in foreign relations. They resented his "monopolization of authority." While these charges reflected the grievances of various opposition groups, both conservative and liberal, the consensus is that avenging Saigō Takamori's death was an important motivation for the assassins. Immediately after that, they turned themselves in to a nearby palace. The six assassins were later executed at Ichigaya Prison on 27 July of the same year. Ōkubo's murder set a precedent for subsequent political assassinations of top government officials.

== Personal life ==
Ōkubo was married to Masuko, about whom little is recorded. He also maintained a concubine, Oyu, which was customary for men of his standing. His children included Yoshiko (eldest daughter), and sons Hikonoshin (Toshikazu), Nobukuma (who became the statesman Makino Nobuaki), Toshitake, Tatsukuma, Yukuma, Shunkuma, Shichikuma, and Toshikata. He took a keen interest in their education, placing two sons in American schools. His personal diversions included shogi, smoking, hunting, and attending sumo matches. In public life, he was often perceived as coldly austere, but he seems to have shed this manner in the presence of his family.

== Legacy ==
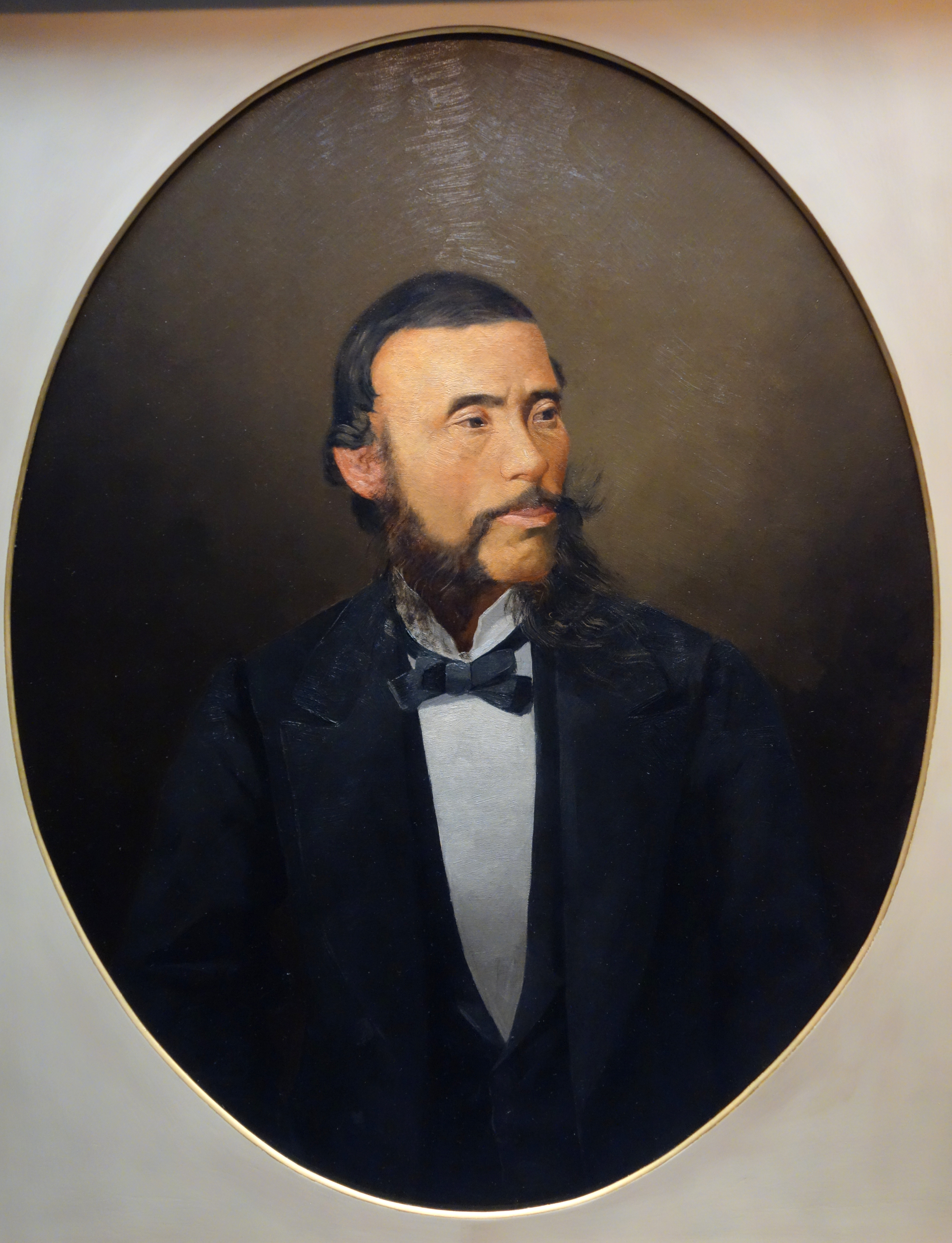
Posthumous portrait by Ando Nakataro

Ōkubo Toshimichi is regarded as one of the most important figures in the Meiji Restoration and the founding of modern Japan. His unwavering dedication to unifying and strengthening the nation, his administrative competence, and his far-sighted policies laid the groundwork for Japan's rapid modernization. He was a master of Realpolitik, adapting his methods and ideologies to achieve his overarching goal of a strong, centralized state. Although his authoritarian tendencies and the concentration of power in his hands drew criticism, his leadership during a tumultuous period was crucial for Japan's survival and development. The establishment of a stable government and basic policies by 1878, the year of his death, allowed succeeding leaders to continue the work he had begun.

The three principal leaders of the Restoration—Kido, Saigō, and Ōkubo—all died within a year of each other, marking the end of a decade in which the power of the new state had been consolidated. His death, along with Kido's, marked a transition of leadership to a second generation of Meiji oligarchs, including Itō Hirobumi and Ōkuma Shigenobu. Ōkubo's death was considered a public misfortune for Japan, as it lost a shrewd and realistic statesman who had ably fulfilled his mission of transforming a feudal country into a modern nation. In later years, the Tosa politician Sasaki Takayuki would lament the absence of a leader with Ōkubo's willingness to face down opposition head-on.

== Honours ==
- Junior First Rank (22 May 1901; posthumous)

== In popular culture ==
In the manga/anime series Rurouni Kenshin, Ōkubo Toshimichi appears to seek Himura Kenshin's assistance in destroying the threat posed by the revolt of Shishio Makoto. Kenshin is uncertain, and Ōkubo gives him a May 14 deadline to make his decision. On his way to seek Kenshin's answer on that day, he is supposedly assassinated by Seta Sōjirō, Shishio's right-hand man.

Arata Iura portrayed Ōkubo Toshimichi in 2025 Netflix TV series Last Samurai Standing, streamed in November 2025.
