= Three Great Nobles of the Restoration =

Japanese historical term for three important figures in the 1868 Meiji Restoration

The Three Great Nobles of the Restoration (維新の三傑, Ishin no Sanketsu; lit. 'Three outstanding heroes in the restoration') is a term used in Japan for three figures that played an important role in the Meiji Restoration in 1868 and are regarded as the founders of the modern state of Japan.

The Three Great Nobles were:

- Ōkubo Toshimichi of the Satsuma Domain (Satsuma-han)
- Saigō Takamori of the Satsuma Domain (Satsuma-han)
- Kido Takayoshi (also known as Katsura Kogorō) of the Chōshū Domain (Chōshū-han)

All Three Great Nobles were samurai of the Satchō Alliance, and died within a short period of time between 1877 (Meiji 10) and 1878 (Meiji 11). Saigō led the Satsuma Rebellion, the largest uprising against the new Meiji government, and died at the Battle of Shiroyama. Kido died from an unknown illness during the Satsuma Rebellion, and Ōkubo was later assassinated by former samurai of the Kaga Domain (modern day Ishikawa Prefecture) for his involvement against the uprising.

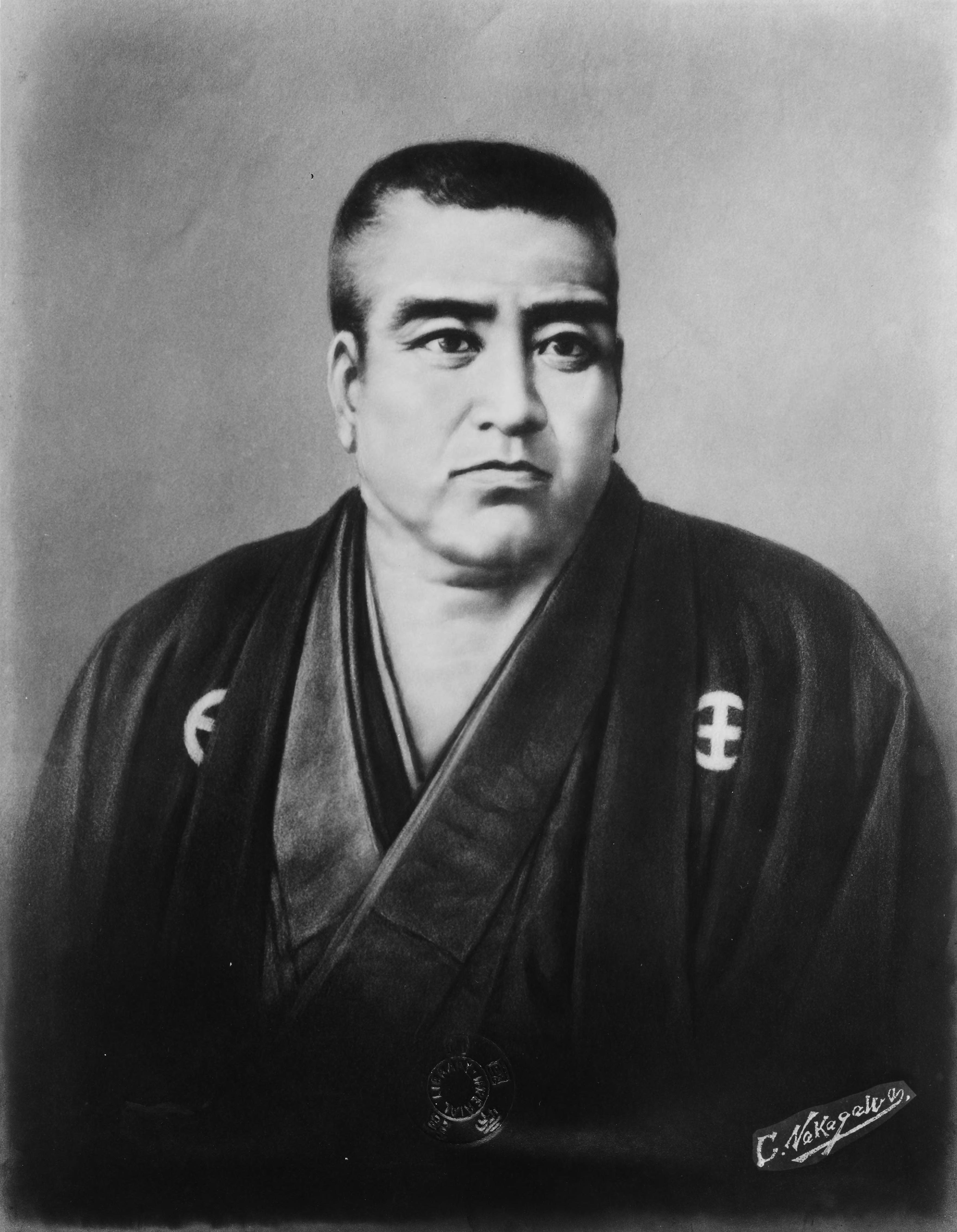
Saigō Takamori
(January 23, 1828 – September 24, 1877)

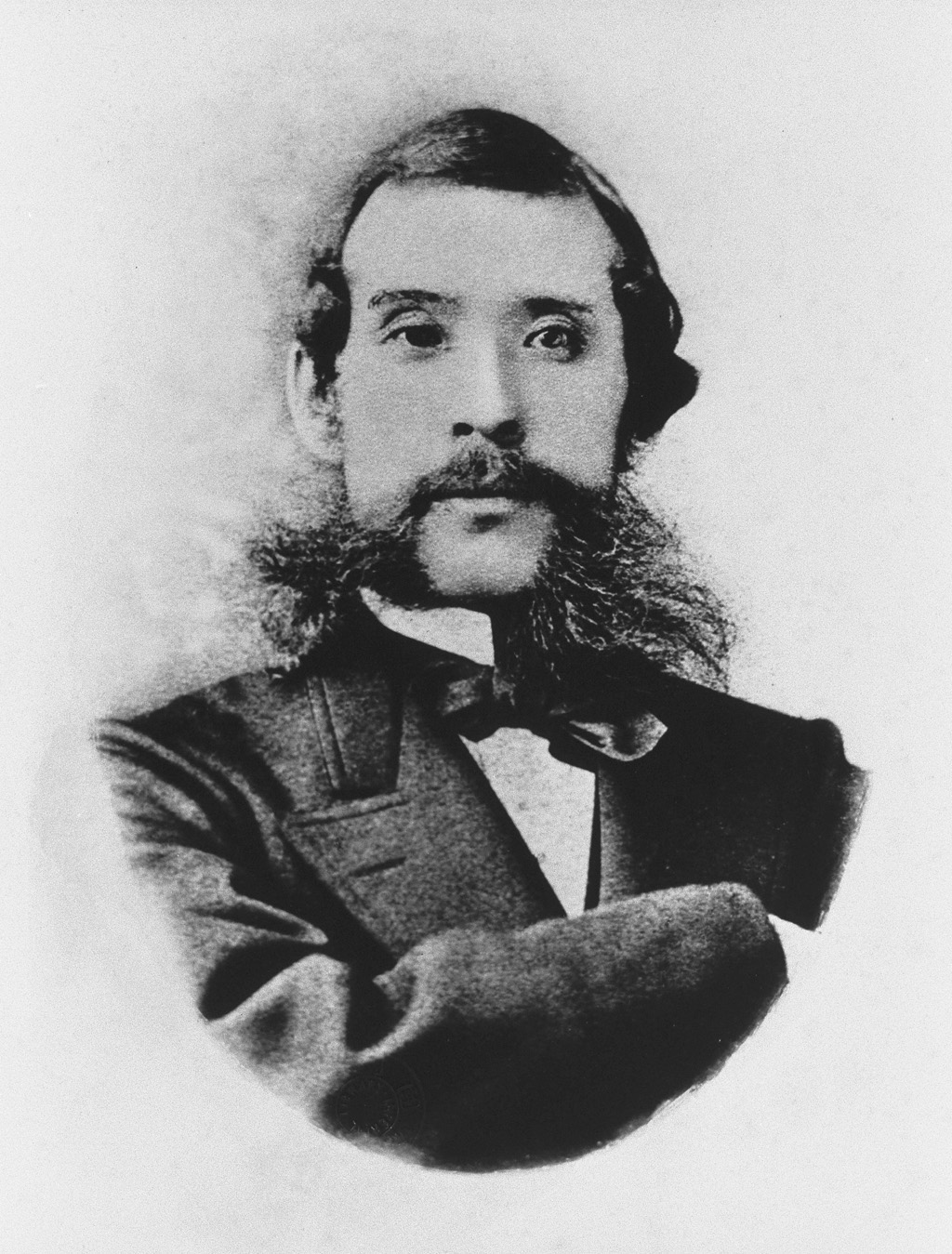
Ōkubo Toshimichi
(September 26, 1830 – May 14, 1878)

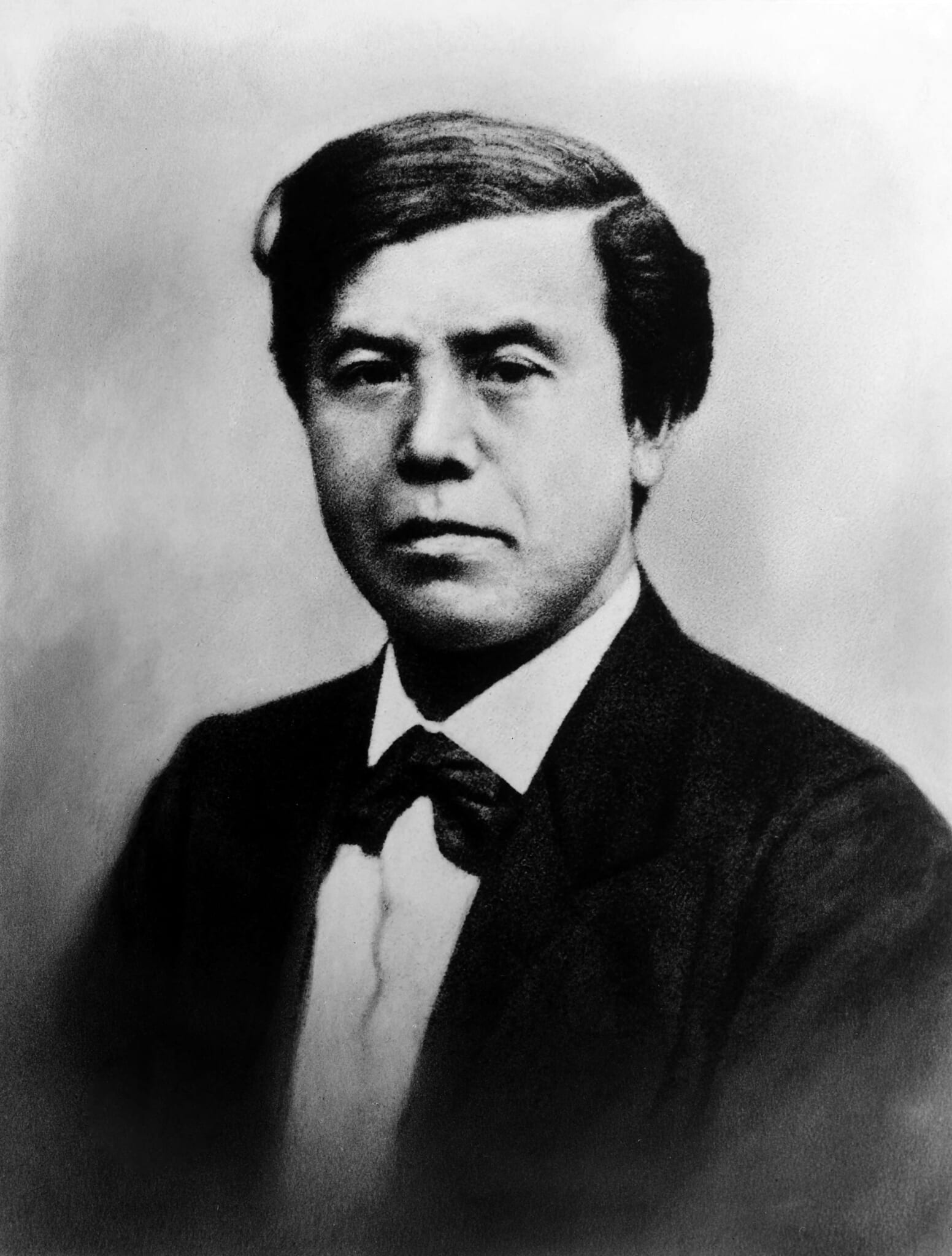
Kido Takayoshi
(August 11, 1833 – May 26, 1877)

Preceded by Shōgun Tokugawa Yoshinobu	Meiji Restoration; 1868–1885	Succeeded by Itō Hirobumi as Prime Minister
