= Kido Takayoshi =

Japanese statesman (1833–1877)

Junior First Rank Kido Takayoshi
- 木戸 孝允
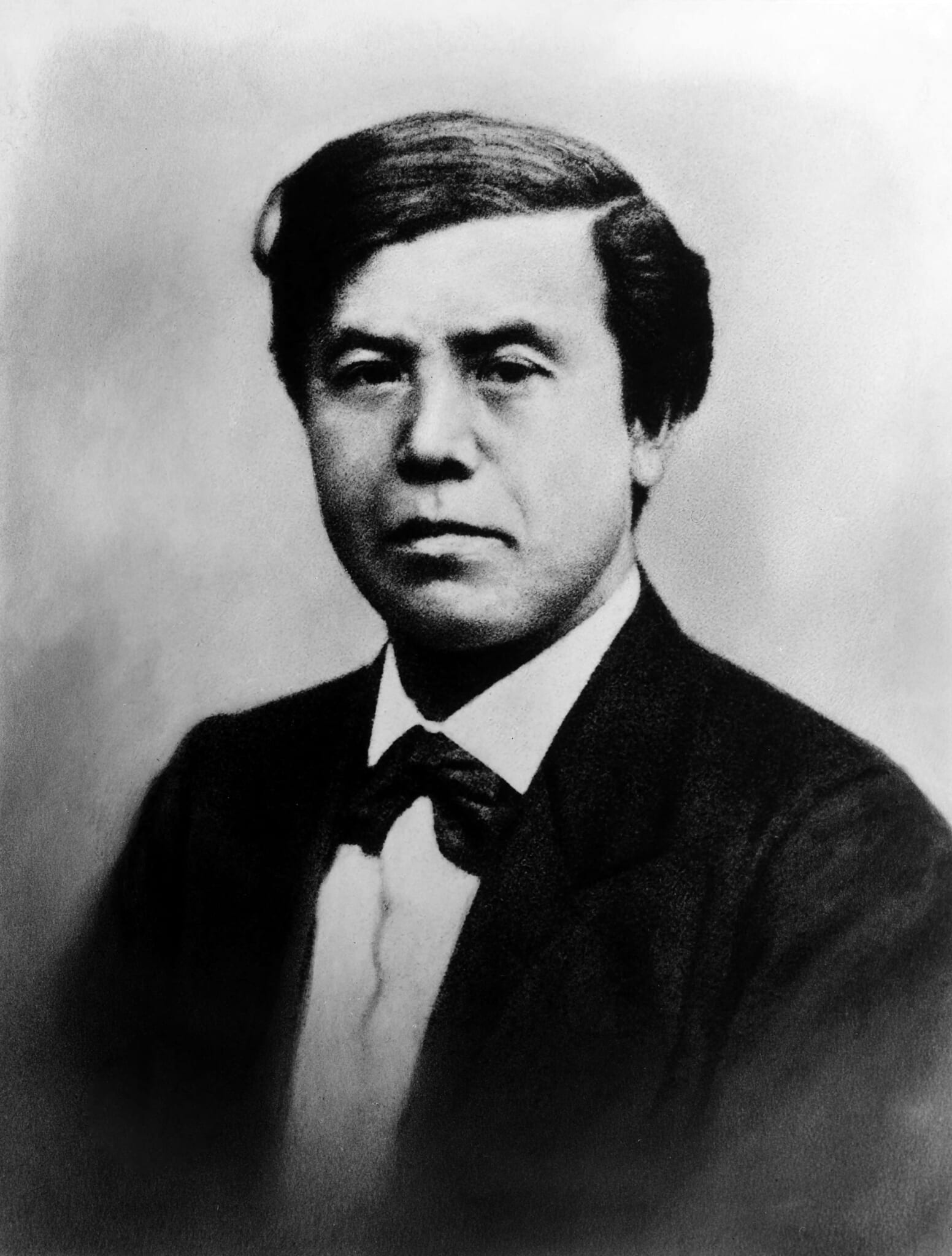
- Kido Takayoshi in western dress (after Meiji Restoration)

Minister of Education
- In office January 25, 1874 – May 13, 1874
- Monarch: Meiji
- Preceded by: Ōki Takatō
- Succeeded by: Tanaka Fujimaro (interim); Saigō Jūdō

Lord of Home Affairs
- In office February 14, 1874 – April 27, 1874
- Monarch: Meiji
- Preceded by: Ōkubo Toshimichi
- Succeeded by: Ōkubo Toshimichi

Personal details
- Born: Wada Kogorō (和田 小五郎); August 11, 1833 Hagi, Chōshū, Japan
- Died: May 26, 1877 (aged 43) Kyoto, Japan
- Resting place: Kyoto Ryozen Gokoku Shrine
- Spouse: Kido Matsuko (m. 1868–1877)
- Relatives: Kōichi Kido (grandnephew)
- Education: Meirinkan; Shōka Sonjuku
- Occupation: statesman
- Profession: politics
- Known for: One of the Three Great Nobles of the Restoration
- Other names: Katsura Kogorō (桂 小五郎); Niibori Matsusuke (新堀 松輔); Kido Kanji (木戸 貫冶); Kido Junichirō (木戸 準一郎); Kido Kōin (木戸 孝允)
- Notable works: The Diary of Kido Takayoshi Volume 1 (1868-1871); The Diary of Kido Takayoshi Volume 2 (1874-1877)

Kido Takayoshi (木戸 孝允; born Wada Kogorō (和田 小五郎); August 11, 1833 – May 26, 1877), formerly known as Katsura Kogorō (桂 小五郎), was a Japanese statesman, samurai and shishi who is considered one of the three great nobles who led the Meiji Restoration.

== Early life ==
Born Wada Kogorō on August 11, 1833 in Hagi, Chōshū Domain (present-day Yamaguchi Prefecture) as the son of a samurai physician Wada Masakage (和田 昌景) and his second wife Seiko (清子). In 1840, due to his brother-in-law already being the head of the Wada family, he was later adopted into the Katsura family at age seven and was known as Katsura Kogorō (桂 小五郎).

The Katsura family's stipend was originally 150 koku, but due to the late nature of his adoption which took place as his adoptive father Katsura Takako (桂 孝古) was already on his deathbed, who died ten days later, it was reduced to 90 koku. Katsura Kogorō thus became the head of the Katsura family. A year later in 1841, his adoptive mother also died, months later he was returned to his old home. In 1848, he lost his mother and elder half-sister Yaeko to illnesses.

Katsura was educated at Meirinkan, in which he later became increasingly unhappy with and defied his father in order to be educated at Shōka Sonjuku in 1849, the academy of Yoshida Shōin, from whom he adopted the philosophy of Imperial loyalism. In 1851, his father had died.

In 1852, Katsura went to Edo (present-day Tokyo) to study swordsmanship, established ties with radical samurai from the Mito Domain (present-day Mito, Ibaraki Prefecture), learned artillery techniques with Egawa Tarōzaemon, and (after observing the construction of foreign ships in Nagasaki and Shimoda), returned to Chōshū to supervise the construction of the domain's first western-style warship.

== Overthrow of the Tokugawa ==
After 1858, Katsura Kogorō was based at the domain's Edo residence, where he served as a liaison between the domain bureaucracy and radical elements among the young, lower-echelon Chōshū samurai who supported the Sonnō jōi movement. Coming under suspicion by the shogunate for his ties with Mito loyalists after the attempted assassination of Andō Nobumasa, he was transferred to Kyōto. However, while in Kyōto, he was unable to prevent the 30 September 1863 coup d'état by the forces of the Aizu and Satsuma domains, who drove the Chōshū forces out of the city.

=== Ikedaya incident ===
According to his personal diary regarding the Ikedaya incident, Katsura was at the loyalist meeting with the Ishin Shishi at the Ikedaya inn in the evening on July 8, 1864. He claimed that they had only met to discuss how to rescue Furutaka Shuntaro from the Shinsengumi. Katsura later left the inn earlier, before the attack by the Shinsengumi troops on that night.

However, there were rumors varied that Katsura was tipped off by his geisha lover Ikumatsu (幾松), that the Shinsengumi were coming for him and wisely chose not show up for the meeting, or that he climbed out the window of the upper floor of the inn during the attack by the Shinsengumi and escaped over the roofs.

He spent the next five days in hiding under Nijō Bridge along the Kamo River, posing as a beggar, his lover would bring him rice balls from the shop of the Chōshū merchant Imai Tarōemon and later aided in his escape.

=== Kinmon incident ===
Katsura was involved but not present in the Hamaguri Gate Rebellion on 20 August 1864, with the unsuccessful attempt to capture Emperor Kōmei by the Chōshū forces at Hamaguri Gate in order to restore the Imperial household to its position of political supremacy, the Chōshū forces clashed with Aizu and Satsuma forces who led the defense of the Imperial palace. During the attempt, the Chōshū rebels put Kyoto on fire, starting with the residence of the Takatsukasa family, and that of a Chōshū official.

The rebellion resulted in 28,000 houses being burnt down, with casualties of about 400 from the Chōshū forces, including his adopted son Katsuzaburō, and only 60 from Aizu and Satsuma forces, forcing Katsura into hiding again with his geisha lover. He would later use the name Niibori Matsusuke as an alias in 1865 to continue his work against the Tokugawa bakufu.

=== Satchō Alliance ===
After radical elements under Takasugi Shinsaku gained control of Chōshū politics, Katsura, under the new name Kido Junichirō (木戸 準一郎) was instrumental in establishing the Satchō Alliance with Saigō Takamori and Ōkubo Toshimichi through the mediation of Sakamoto Ryōma in 1866, which proved to be critical in the Boshin War and the subsequent Meiji Restoration. Around the same time, he adopted Shojirō, another nephew who was the second son of his younger sister, Kuruhara Haruko, as his heir.

== Meiji statesman ==
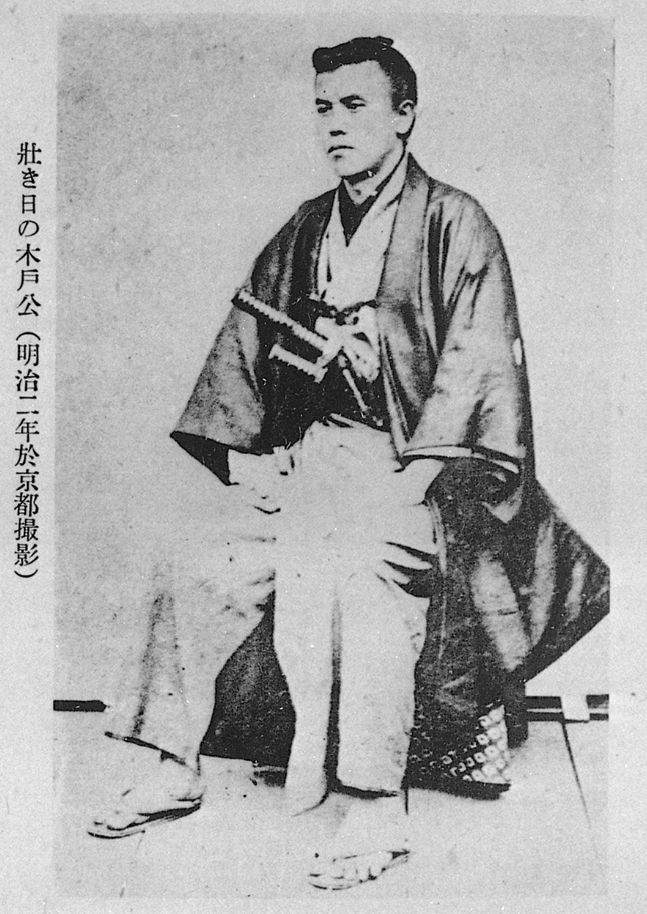
Portrait of Kido Takayoshi (木戸孝允, 1833 – 1877)

Following the overthrow of the Tokugawa bakufu in 1868, Kido claimed a large role in the establishment of the new Meiji government. As a san'yo (Imperial Advisor) he helped draft the Five Charter Oath, and initiated policies of centralization and modernization. He helped direct the Abolition of the han system. In August 1868, he had his lover Ikumatsu adopted into a samurai family of Okabe Tomitarō, and later made her his wife. He was later renamed to Kido Takayoshi (木戸 孝允) in 1869.

Kido was a vocal opponent of hereditary privilege, advocating for appointments based on merit rather than social rank. In his diary, he warned that hereditary systems would lead to "stagnation in future generations," and resisted the notion of passing on rank or stipend to his descendants, even when personally offered a significant merit award. Despite accepting the stipend in 1869, he remained critical of the class-based limitations of Meiji governance.

On 23 December 1871, he accompanied the Iwakura Mission on its round-the-world voyage to America and Europe, and was especially interested in Western educational systems and politics. On his return to Japan on 13 September 1873, he would become a strong advocate of the establishment of constitutional government. Realizing that Japan was not in any position to challenge the Western powers in its present state, he also returned to Japan just in time to prevent an invasion of Korea (Seikanron).

In his later years, Kido became increasingly critical of excessive centralization and showed deep concern for those affected adversely by rapid modernization. He criticized policies that impoverished the shizoku (former samurai) and the peasantry, and called for relief efforts and localized development to aid his former comrades in Chōshū. Kido expressed guilt over the suffering of Restoration-era soldiers and advocated that foreign and domestic policy should prioritize the needs of "the suffering masses." His opposition to the 1874 Taiwan Expedition and the 1873 Korea invasion proposal stemmed in part from this concern.

Kido lost his dominant position in the Meiji oligarchy to Ōkubo Toshimichi, and resigned from government in protest of the Taiwan Expedition of 1874, which he had strenuously opposed.

Following the Osaka Conference of 1875, Kido agreed to return to the government, and became chairman of the Assembly of Prefectural Governors that the Ōsaka Conference had created. He was also responsible for the education of the young Emperor Meiji.

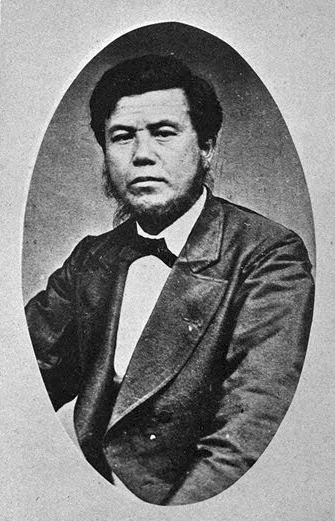
Kido Takayoshi (1833-1877)

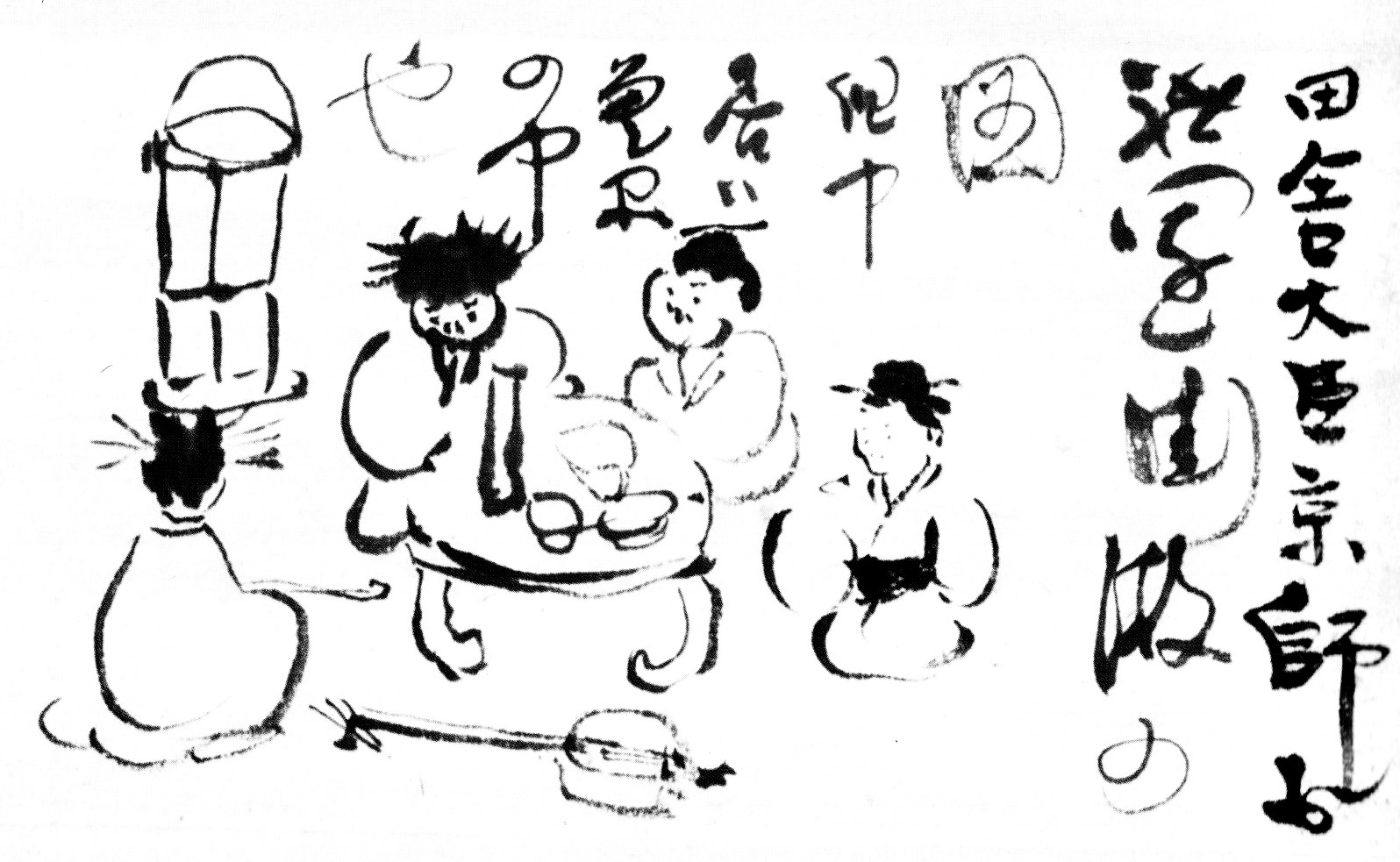
Sketch by Kido Takayoshi, depicting him as "Minister from the countryside."

== Death ==
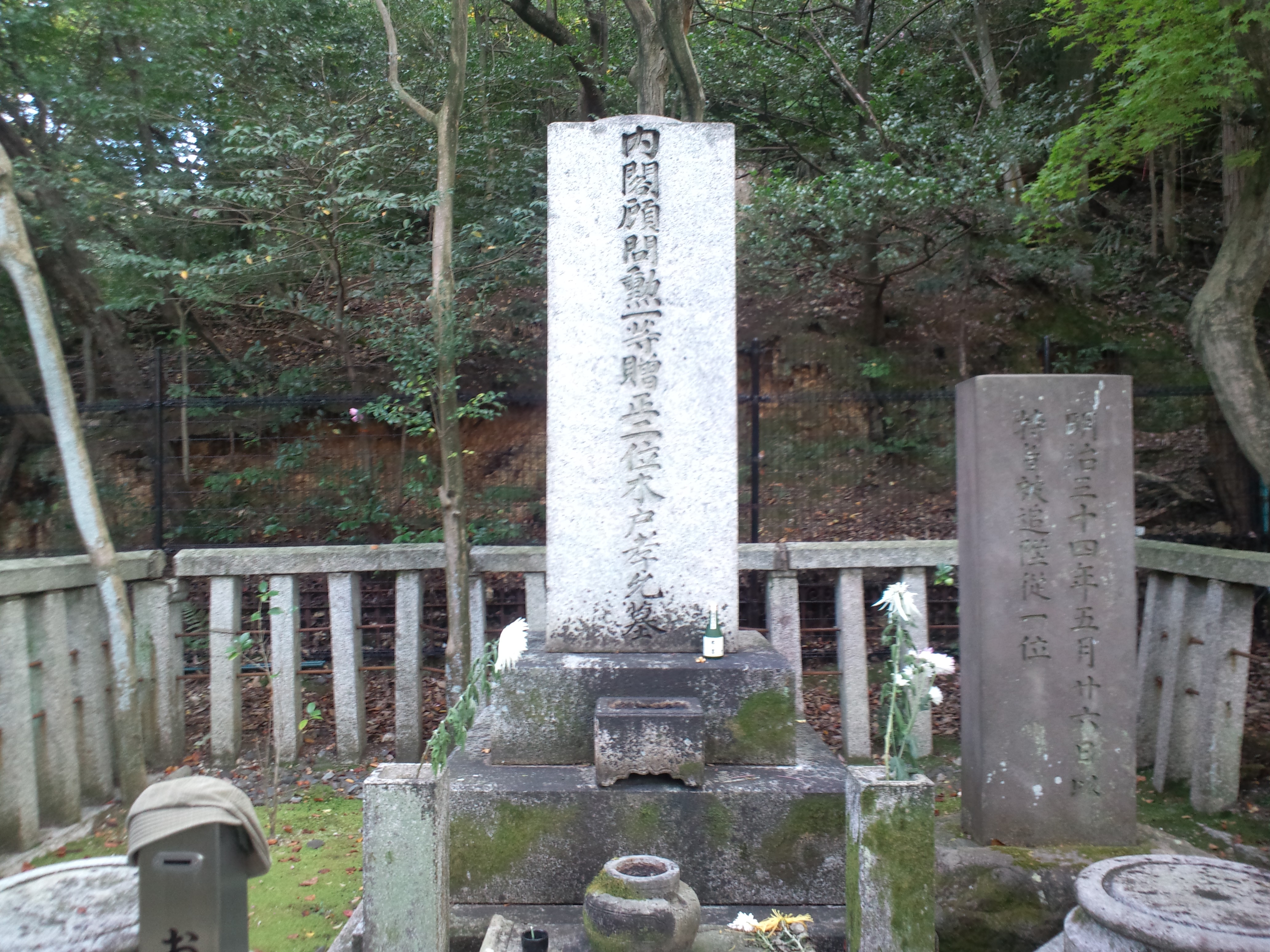
Tomb of Kido Takayoshi at Kyoto Ryozen Gokoku Shrine, Kyoto, Japan

During the middle of the Satsuma Rebellion in 1877, he died of Colorectal cancer that had been plaguing him for a long time, which consisted of a combination of some form of mental disease and physical exhaustion, years of excessive alcohol consumption as well as an illness assumed to be tuberculosis or beriberi. With his dim consciousness, Kido shook Ōkubo's hand and said, "Enough Saigō." He is enshrined at Kyoto Ryozen Gokoku Shrine, where his tomb is located.

== Legacy ==
His heir Shojirō, who had studied for ten years in England before returning to Japan in 1882, however died of illness on the ship during the return journey near Ceylon. Kuruhara Hikotarō, another Kido's nephew and Shojirō's eldest brother, succeeded him as the new heir of the Kido family on 18 November 1884 and was known as the Marquis Kido Takamasa.

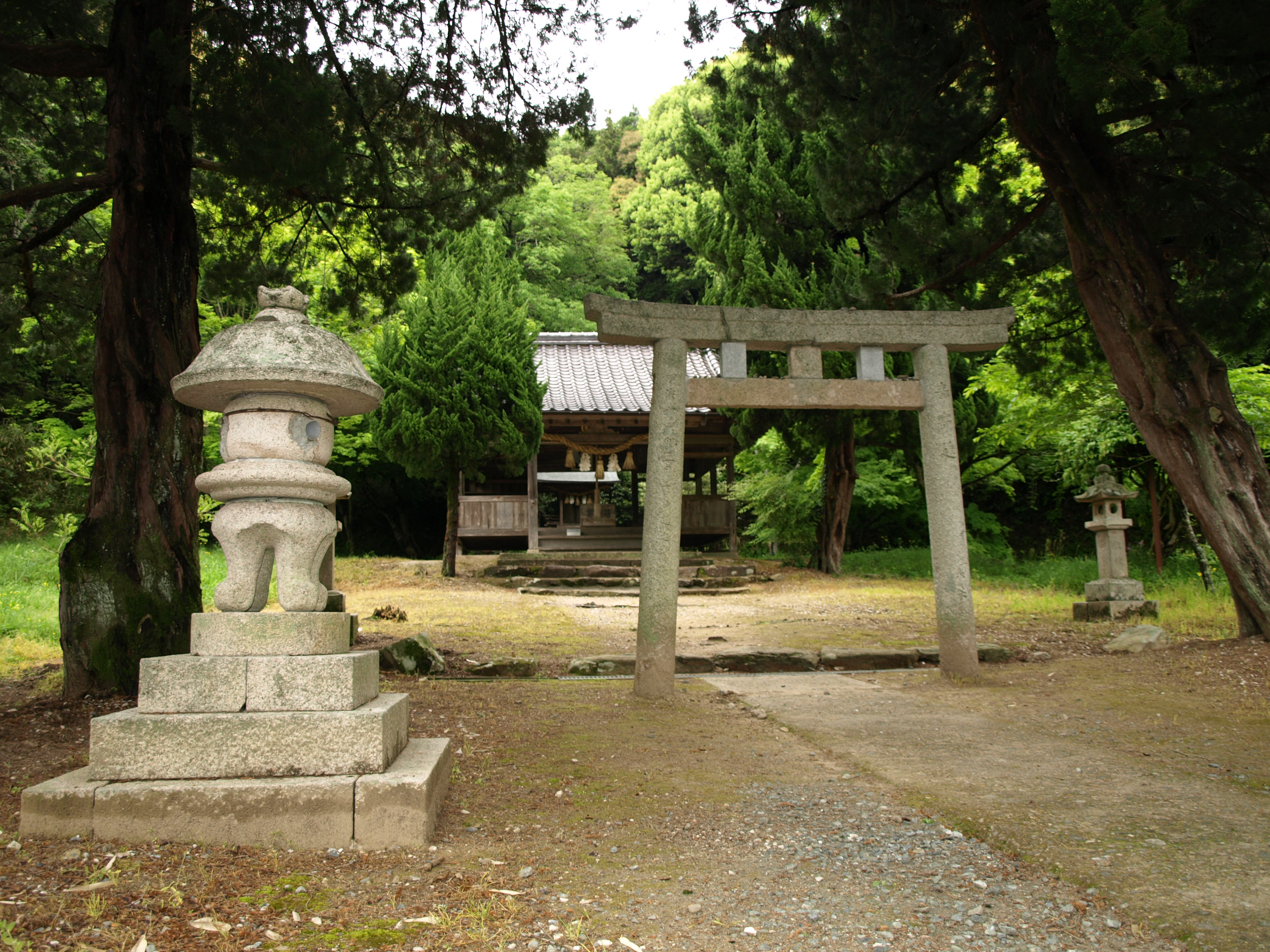
Kido Shrine, Yamaguchi, Yamaguchi Prefecture, Japan

Kido Takayoshi was enshrined as the Shinto deity of scholarship and the martial arts at the Kido Shrine in about 1886 at Kido Park, Yamaguchi, Yamaguchi Prefecture, Japan.

His widow Matsuko survived him and died in 1887 at the age of 43.

Kido's diary reveals an intense internal conflict between his loyalty to his home domain, Chōshū, and the greater interest of the country. He wrote often of having to fight rumors at home that he had betrayed his old friends; the idea of a nation was still relatively new in Japan and so the majority of samurai cared more for securing privileges for their own domain.

He was friends with the English Legation interpreter Ernest Satow. The two met many times from the Shimonoseki incident onwards.

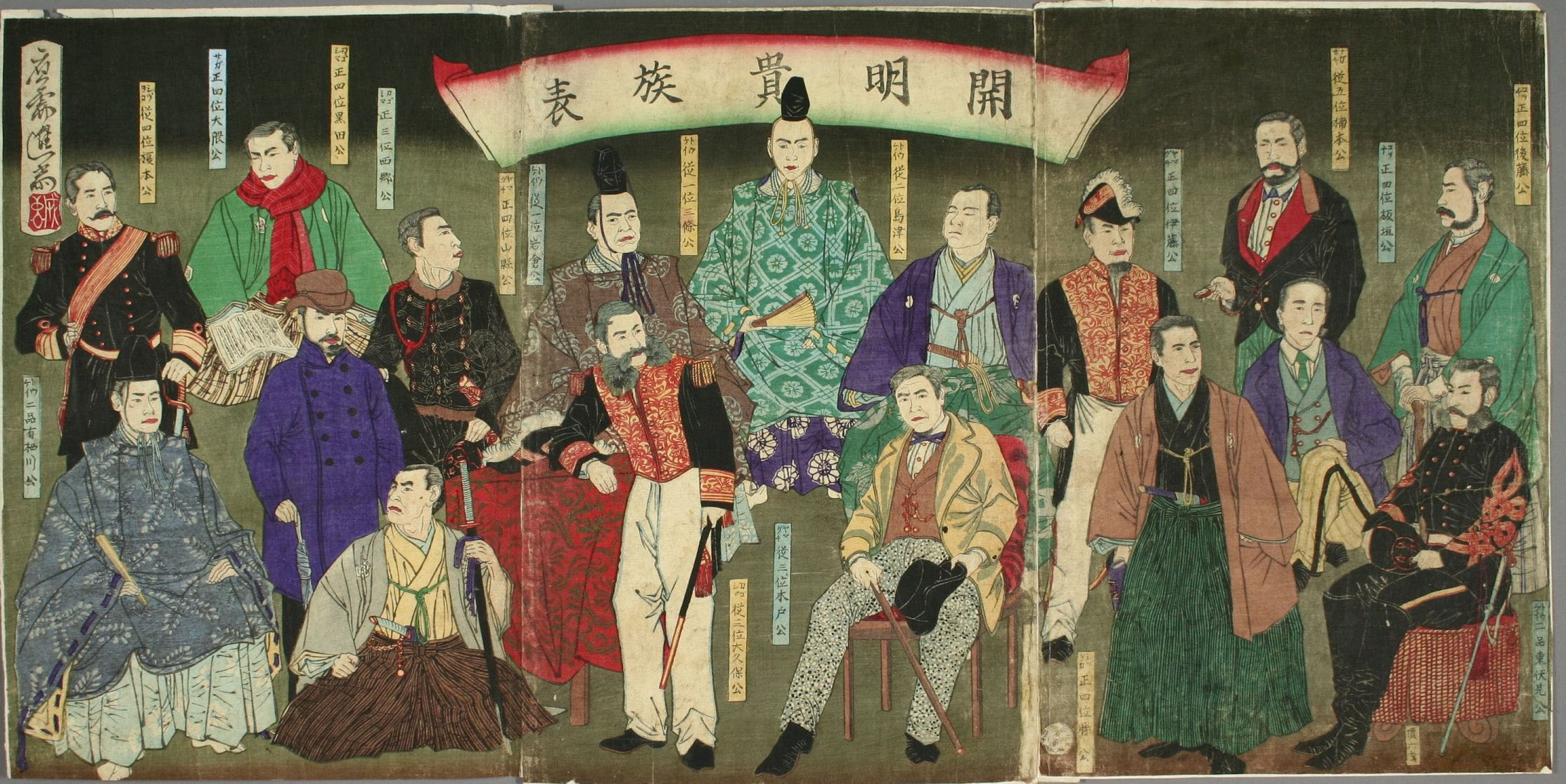
Enlightenment aristocracy, Woodblock print (nishiki-e); ink and color on paper Prince Arisugawa Taruhito, Enomoto Takeaki, Ōkuma Shigenobu, Kuroda Kiyotaka, Saigō Takamori, Yamagata Aritomo, Iwakura Tomomi, Sanjō Sanetomi, Ōkubo Toshimichi, Kido Takayoshi, Shimazu Hisamitsu, Katsu Kaishū, Itō Hirobumi, Kusumoto Masataka, Itagaki Taisuke, Gotō Shōjirō and Prince Komatsu Akihito

Together with Saigō Takamori and Ōkubo Toshimichi, he was known as the Ishin-no-Sanketsu (維新の三傑), which means, roughly, "Three Great Nobles of the Restoration". His younger sister's grandson was Tokyo politician Kōichi Kido (木戸 幸一).

== Kido Takayoshi former residence in Hagi ==
The house where Kido Takayoshi was born and where he lived for about 20 years before moving to Edo still exists in Hagi and is a memorial museum. Although he had been adopted into the Katsura family when he was seven years old, he continued to live in this family home. The former residence is located on a street called Edoya Yokocho, and is a two-story wooden building with a tiled roof. In the house there are hanging scrolls with examples of Japanese calligraphy Kido wrote as a child, with corrections in red ink by his teachers. Volunteer guides are stationed in the building. The building was designated a National Historic Site in 1934.

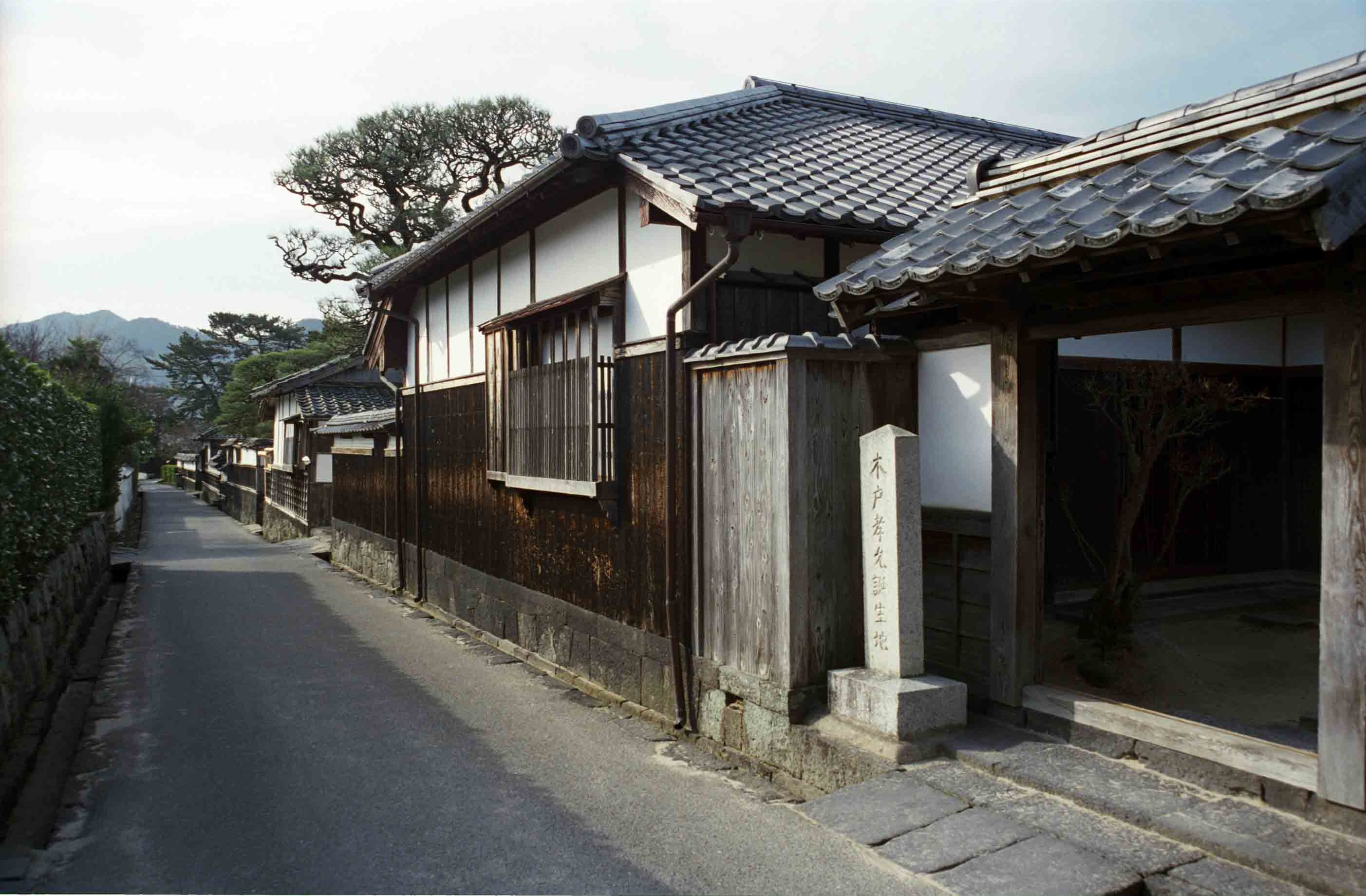

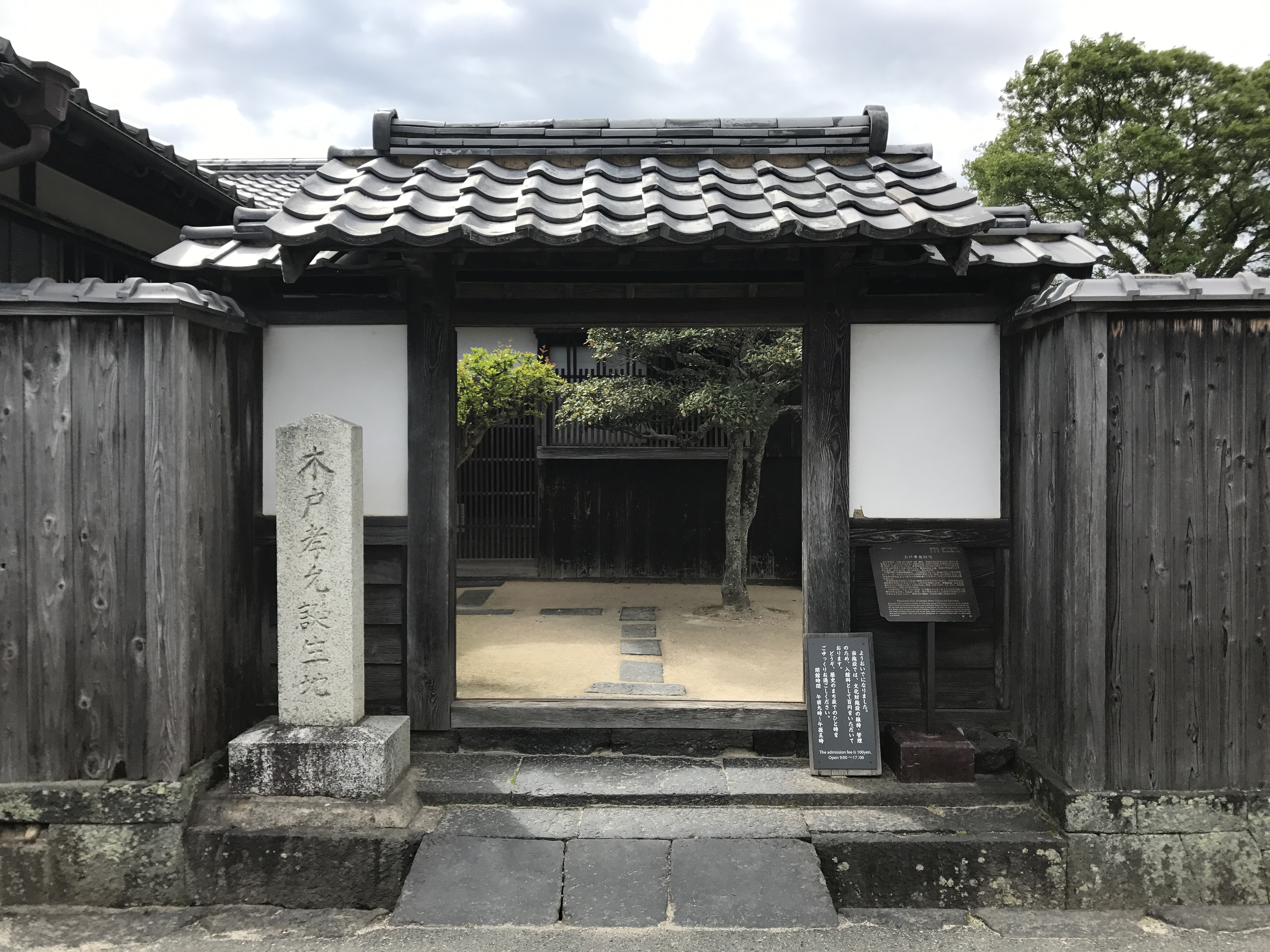
Gate of former residence of Kido Takayoshi

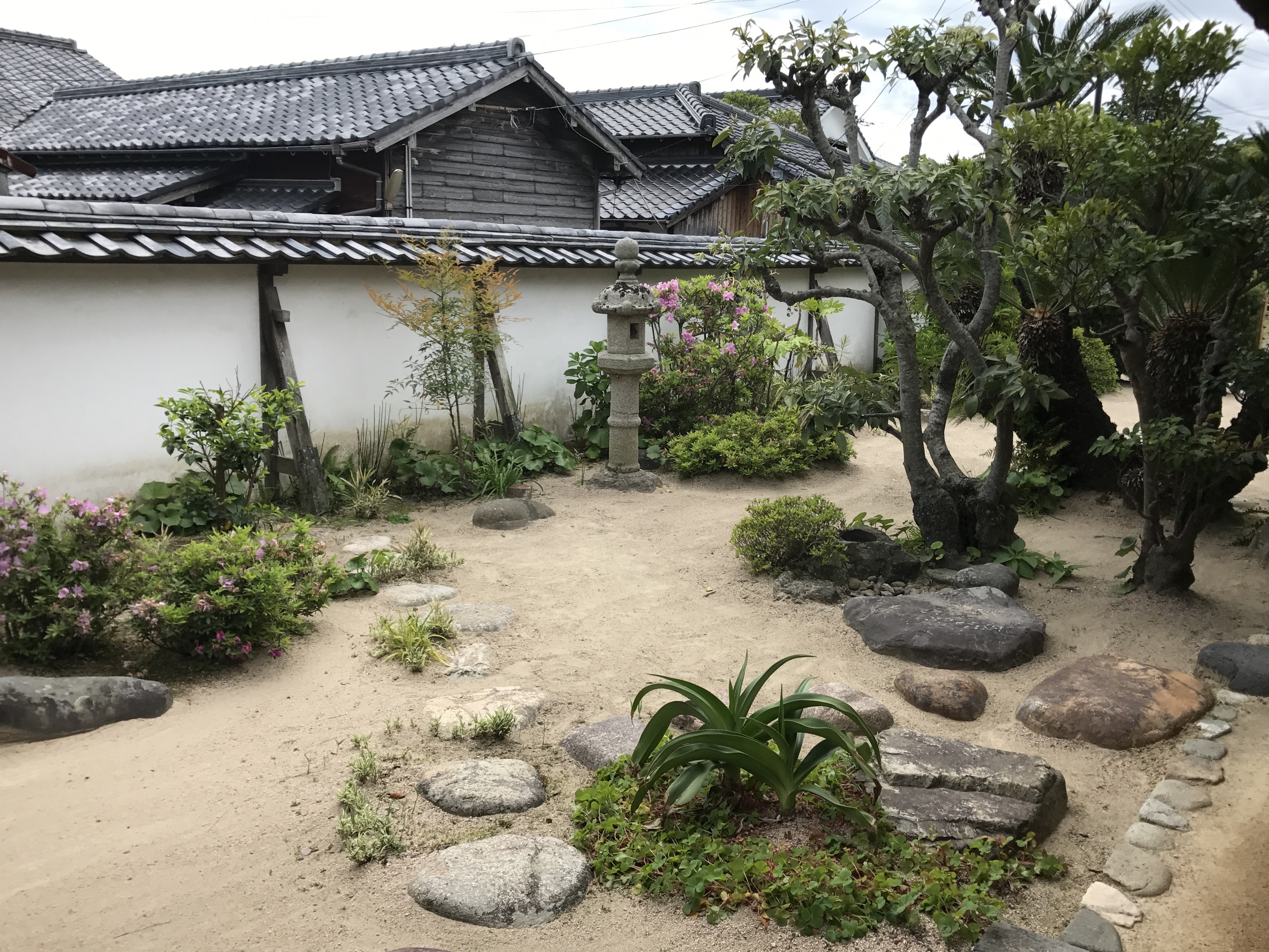
Garden of former residence of Kido Takayoshi

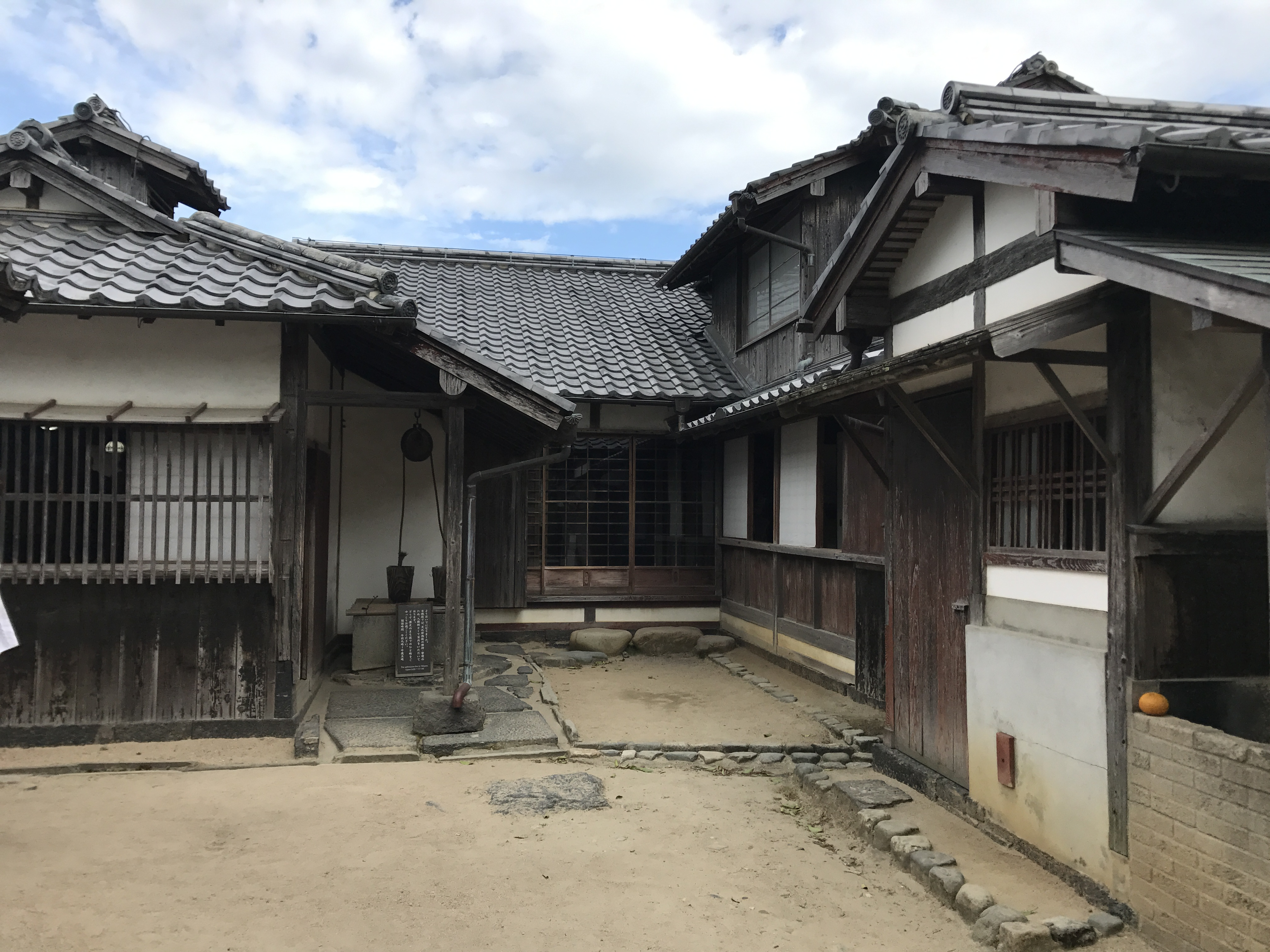

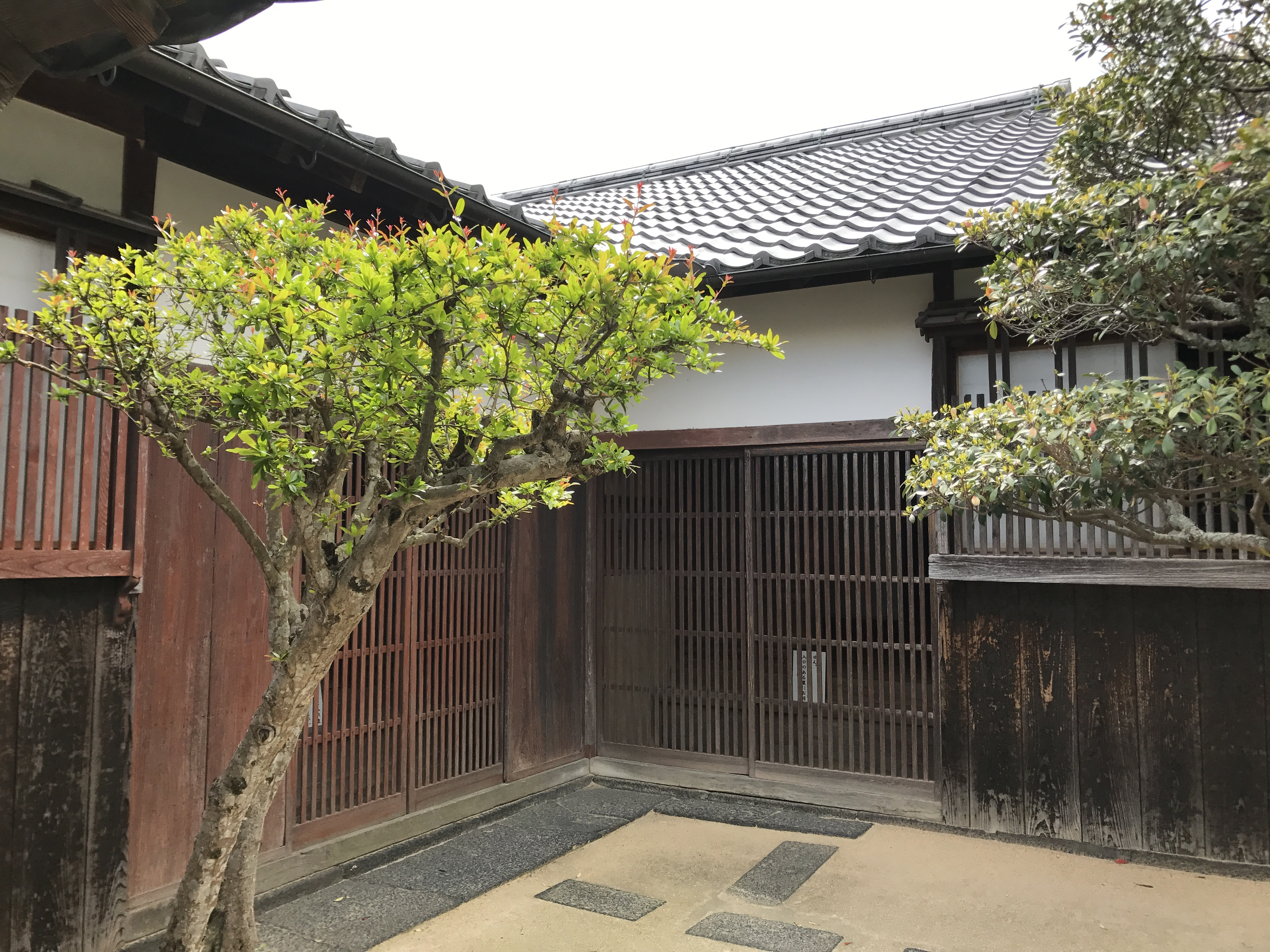

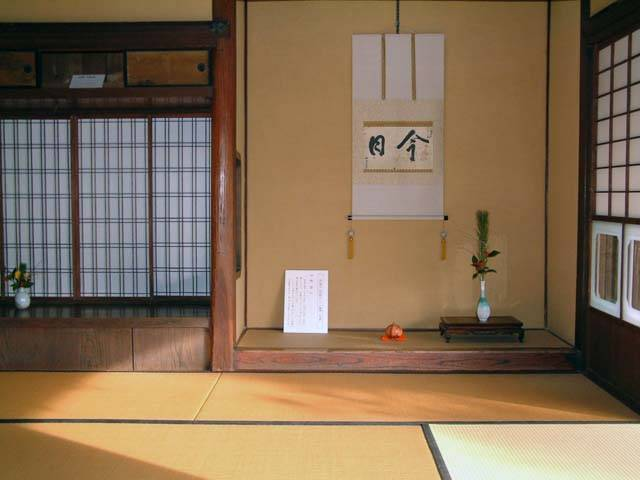
Childhood room of Kido Takayoshi

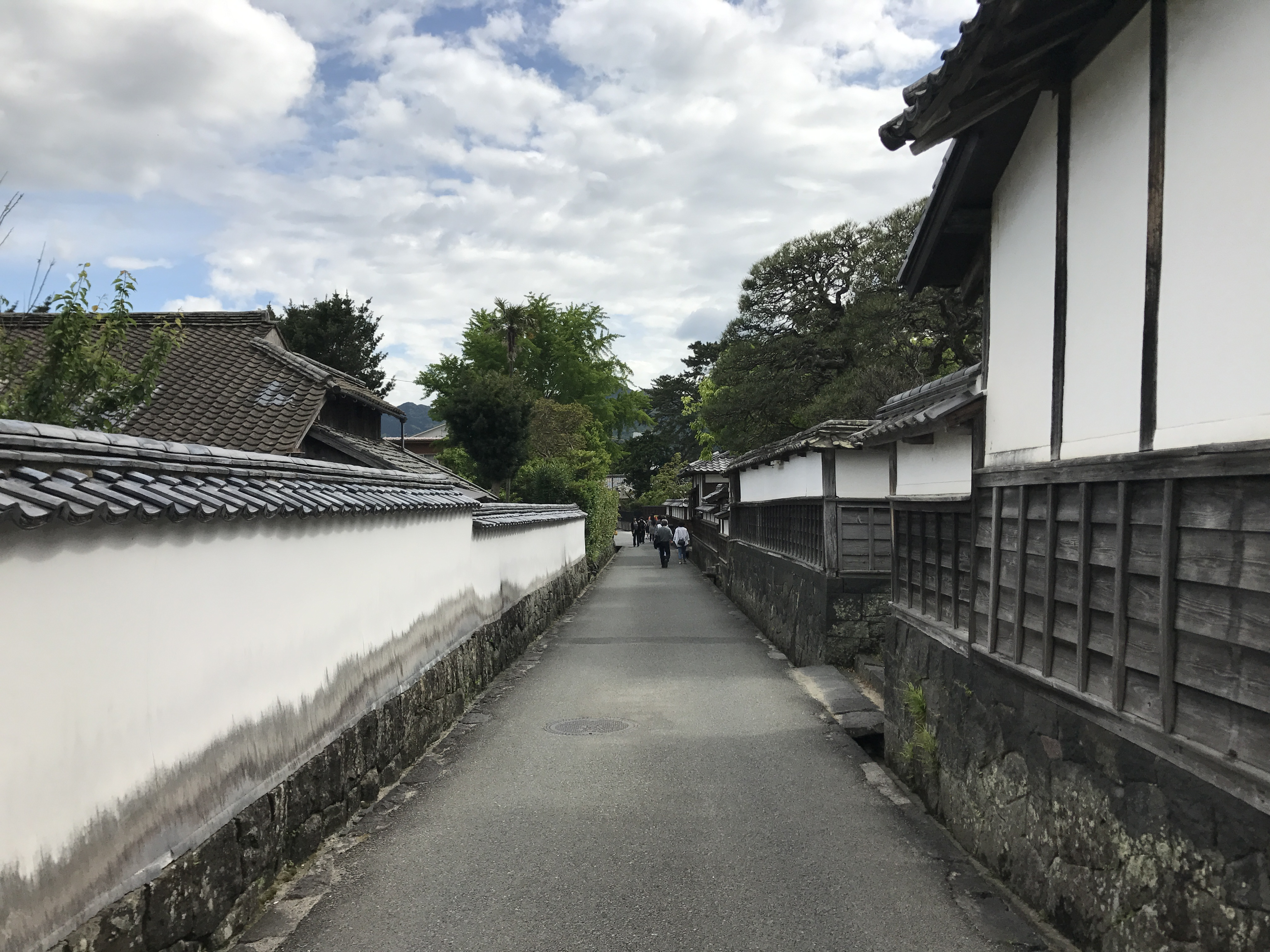
Edoya Lane near former residence of Kido Takayoshi

== In popular culture ==
Kido, referred to by his initial name Katsura Kogorō, was among the historical personalities present in the manga and anime Rurouni Kenshin by Nobuhiro Watsuki, as well as its OVA adaptation Rurouni Kenshin: Trust & Betrayal. While still portrayed as a ruthless radical leader of the Chōshū clan, he serves as a benevolent mentor of sorts to the young Himura Kenshin, who worked under him as the Hitokiri Battōsai. He nonetheless regrets having Kenshin do the dirty work for him after Kenshin's affair with Yukishiro Tomoe (in Tsuiokuhen, he actively encouraged Tomoe to stand by Kenshin to serve as a calming influence), which ultimately boiled over into her conflicting loyalties to the shogunate agent and her emerging feelings for Kenshin. He is voiced by Tomokazu Seki in the OVA, and portrayed by Issey Takahashi in the 2021 live-action adaptation film Rurouni Kenshin: The Beginning.

Japanese actor Ken Ishiguro portrayed him in the 2004 jdorama Shinsengumi! as the old time friend of the protagonist Kondo Isami and also the leader of the Chōshū han.

Japanese actor Shōsuke Tanihara portrayed him in the 2009 jdorama Ryōmaden as the leader of the Chōshū han.

He is also the basis for the character of Katsura Kotarou in the manga and anime Gin Tama by Hideaki Sorachi.

He also appears in the video game Ryū ga Gotoku Ishin!, portrayed by the Yakuza character Shun Akiyama, and voiced by Kōichi Yamadera.

Katsura Kogorō has also a prominent supporting role in Team Ninjas 2024 Action-RPG Rise of the Rōnin and is one of the many popular personalities from the Bakumatsu-Period, that the player can get acquainted with.

== Honours ==
- Grand Cordon of the Order of the Rising Sun (May 24, 1877)
- Junior First Rank (May 22, 1901; posthumous)

== Notable works ==
- The Diary of Kido Takayoshi Volume 1 (1868-1871)
- The Diary of Kido Takayoshi Volume 2 (1874-1877)

== Reference and further reading ==
- Akamatsu, Paul. Meiji 1868: Revolution and Counter-Revolution in Japan. Trans. Miriam Kochan. New York: Harper & Row, 1972.
- Beasley, William G. (1972). The Meiji Restoration. Stanford: Stanford University Press. ISBN 9780804708159; OCLC 579232
- Beasley, W. G. The Rise of Modern Japan: Political, Economic and Social Change Since 1850. New York: St. Martin's Press, 1995.
- Brown, Sidney D. (1956). "Kido Takayoshi (1833-1877): Meiji Japan's Cautious Revolutionary". Pacific Historical Review. 25 (2): 151–162.
- Craig, Albert M. Chōshū in the Meiji Restoration. Cambridge: Harvard University Press, 1961. OCLC 482814571
- Jansen, Marius B. and Gilbert Rozman, eds. (1986). Japan in Transition: from Tokugawa to Meiji. Princeton: Princeton University Press. ISBN 9780691054599; OCLC 12311985
- Kido, Takayoshi. (1983). The Diary of Kido Takayoshi (Sidney DeVere Brown and Akiko Hirota, translators), Vol. I (1868–1871), Vol. II (1871–1874), Vol. III (1874–1877). Tokyo: University of Tokyo Press.
- Nish, Ian. (1998) The Iwakura Mission to America and Europe: A New Assessment. Richmond, Surrey: Japan Library. ISBN 9781873410844; ISBN 0415471796; OCLC 40410662
