= Chōfu Domain =

Administrative division in western Japan during the Edo period (1600-1871)

Chōfu Domain 長府藩
- Domain of Japan
- 1600–1871
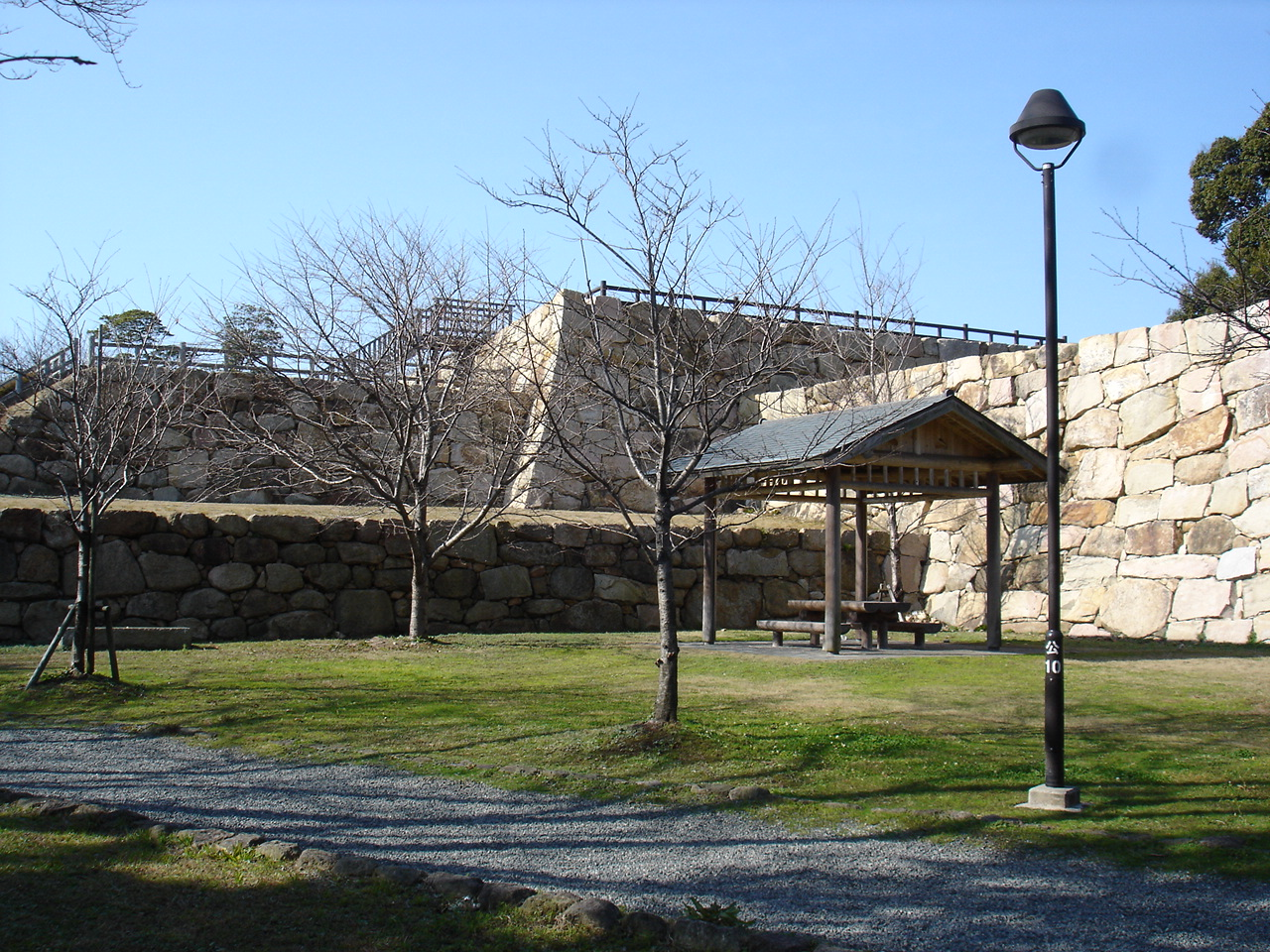
- Ruins of Kushizaki Castle

- Mon of the Mōri clan
- Capital: Kushizaki Castle
- Area
  - Coordinates: 33°59′21.5″N 130°59′38″E
- Historical era: Edo period
  - Established: 1600
  - Abolition of the han system: 1871
- Contained within
  - Province: Nagato Province
- Today part of: Yamaguchi Prefecture

Location of Kushizaki Castle
Chōfu Domain (Japan)

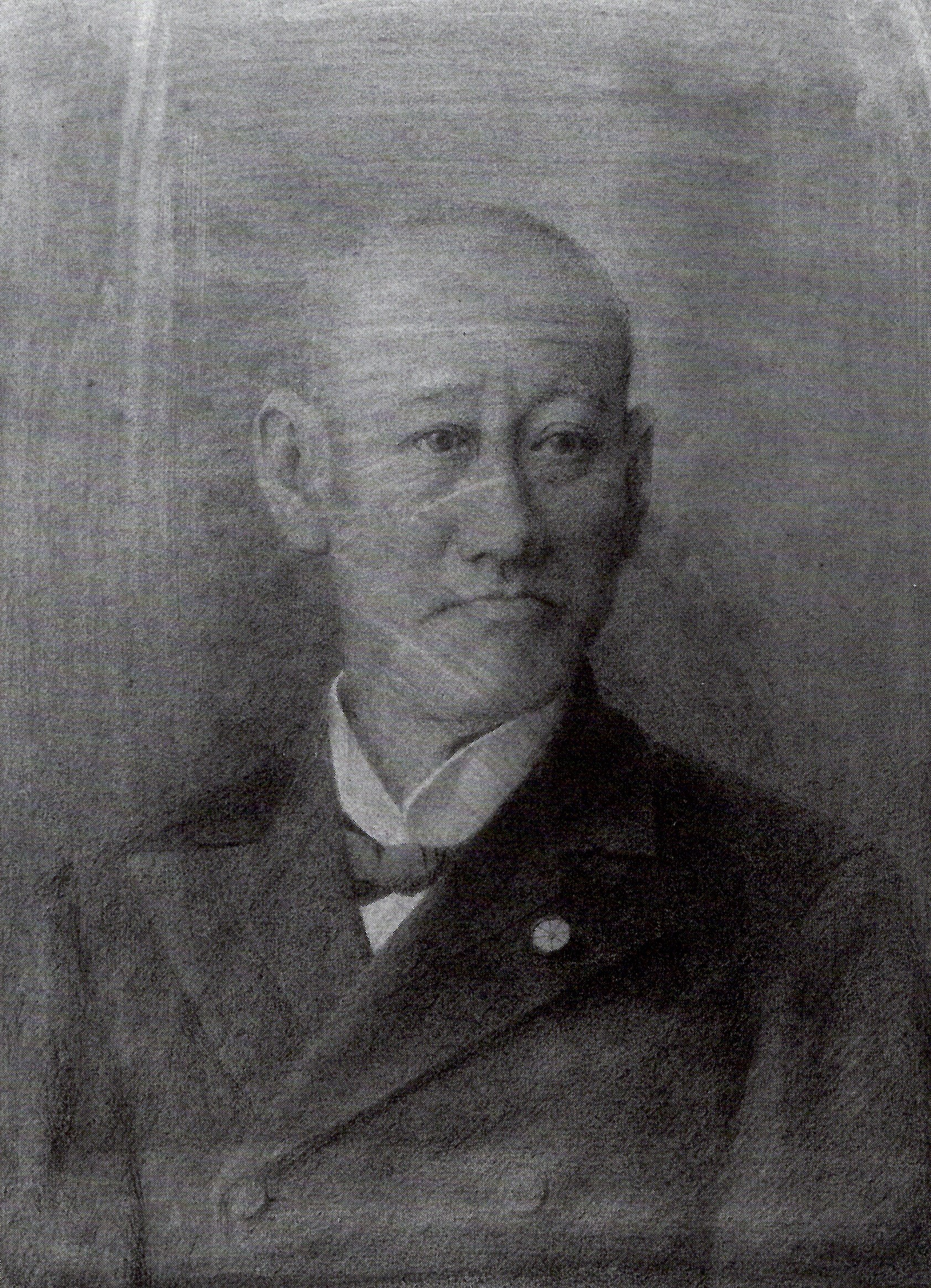
Mōri Mototoshi, final daimyō of Chōfu

Chōfu Domain (長府藩, Chōfu-han) was a feudal domain under the Tokugawa shogunate of Edo period Japan, in what is now part of Shimonoseki, Yamaguchi Prefecture. It was centered around Kushizaki Castle and was ruled throughout its history by a cadet branch of the Mōri clan. Chōfu Domain was dissolved in the abolition of the han system in 1871. The domain was also called Nagato-Chōfu Domain (長門長府藩, Nagato-Chōfu-han) or Nagato-Fuchū Domain (長門府中藩, Nagato-Fuchū-han).

== History ==
Mōri Hidemoto, the grandson of Mōri Motonari was adopted by Mōri Terumoto in 1592 as Terumoto was concerned about his impending deployment to Korea whilst without an official heir. Mōri Motonari agreed to the adoption on the stipulation that if Terumoto should subsequently have a biological heir, his fiefdom would be divided between Hidemoto and the new heir. This in fact occurred with the birth of Mōri Hidenari. Toyotomi Hideyoshi recognized Hidenari as Terumoto's successor in 1598. The following year, Hidemoto received a total of 170,000 koku of estates in Nagato Province, Saiki District in Aki Province and Kishiki District in Suō Province. Although a vassal of Chōshū Domain, Hideyoshi gave him official recognition as an independent daimyō.

After the Battle of Sekigahara in 1600, the Mōri territory was reduced from 1,120,000 koku to 298,000 koku, and was forced to relocate their seat to Nagato Province. The Kikkawa clan was assigned Iwakuni Domain to protect the eastern approaches, and Mōri Hidemoto was given new territory in Toyoura District, Nagato (now part of Shimonoseki) to guard the west. The domain's kokudaka was nominally set at 60,000 koku, but under the 3rd daimyō Mōri Tsunamoto, 10,000 koku was assigned to his uncle, Mōri Mototomo, to form Kiyosue Domain, another subsidiary domain of Chōshū Domain in 1653. Mōri Tsunamoto's son Mōri Yoshimoto and the 8th daimyō, Mōri Masatake became daimyō of Chōshū Domain when the direct lineage failed to produce an heir. In 1718, the domain was reduced to 38,000 koku, but increased back to 47,000 koku in 1720 and 50,000 koku in 1783. During the Bakumatsu period, Chōfu Domain initially attempted to separate itself from the increasingly restive and radicalized Chōshū Domain and come under direct control of the Tokugawa shogunate, but this attempt was unsuccessful and Chōfu subsequently fought in the Boshin War together with Chōshū and the other Chōshū sub-domains. After the Meiji restoration, the domain was briefly (1869-1871) renamed Toyoura Domain (豊浦藩, Toyoura han) before becoming “Toyoura Prefecture”, which was subsequently incorporated into Yamaguchi prefecture.

The final daimyō of Chōfu, Mōri Mototoshi was granted the kazoku peerage title of viscount (shishaku). It was often stated that Emperor Meiji refused to grant him the title of count (hakushaku) as Emperor Meiji's uncle, Nakayama Tadamitsu had been assassinated while in exile in Chōfu. However, as the kazoku peerage guidelines stipulated that former daimyō with kokudaka of between 10,000 and 50,000 koku were to become viscounts, this allegation does not hold water.

== Holdings at the end of the Edo period ==
As with most domains in the han system, Iwakuni Domain consisted of several discontinuous territories calculated to provide the assigned kokudaka, based on periodic cadastral surveys and projected agricultural yields, g.

- Nagato Province
  - 36 villages in Asa District
  - 130 villages in Toyoura District

== List of daimyō ==
#	Name	Tenure	Courtesy title	Court Rank	kokudaka
Mōri clan, 1600-1871 (Tozama)
1	Mōri Hidemoto (毛利秀元)	1600 - 1650	Kai-no-kami, Jijū (甲斐守、侍従)	Senior 4th Rank, Upper Grade (正四位上)	60,000 koku
2	Mōri Mitsuhiro (毛利光広)	1650 - 1653	Izumi-no-kami (和泉守)	Junior 4th Rank, Upper Grade (従四位上)	60,000 koku
3	Mōri Tsunemoto (毛利綱元)	1653 - 1709	Kai-no-kami (甲斐守)	Junior 4th Rank, Upper Grade (従四位上)	60,000 ->50,000 koku
4	Mōri Mototomo (毛利元朝)	1709 - 1712	Sado-no-kami (佐渡守)	Junior 4th Rank, Lower Grade (従四位下)	50,000 koku
5	Mōri Motonori (毛利元矩)	1712 - 1718	-none-	-none-	50,000 -> 38,000 koku
6	Mōri Masahiro (毛利匡広)	1718 - 1729	Kai-no-kami (甲斐守)	Junior 5th Rank, Lower Grade (従五位下)	38,000 ->47,000 koku
7	Mōri Moronari (毛利師就)	1729 - 1735	Mondo-no-sho (主水正)	Junior 5th Rank, Lower Grade (従五位下)	47,000 koku
8	Mōri Shigenari (毛利重就)	1735 - 1751	Kai-no-kami (甲斐守)	Junior 5th Rank, Lower Grade (従五位下)	47,000 koku (note)
9	Mōri Masamitsu (毛利匡満)	1751 - 1769	Noto-no-kami (能登守)	Junior 5th Rank, Lower Grade (従五位下)	47,000 koku
10	Mōri Masayoshi (毛利匡芳)	1769 - 1792	Kai-no-kami (甲斐守)	Junior 5th Rank, Lower Grade (従五位下)	50,000 koku
11	Mōri Motoyoshi (毛利元義)	1792 - 1841	Kai-no-kami (甲斐守)	Junior 4th Rank, Lower Grade (従四位下)	50,000 koku
12	Mōri Motoyuki (毛利元運)	1841 - 1852	Kai-no-kami (甲斐守)	Junior 5th Rank, Lower Grade (従五位下)	50,000 koku
13	Mōri Motochika (毛利元周)	1852 - 1868	Sakyo-no-suke (左京亮)	Junior 5th Rank, Lower Grade (従五位下)	50,000 koku
14	Mōri Mototoshi (毛利元敏)	1868 - 1871	-none-	-none-	50,000 koku

== See also ==
- List of Han
- Abolition of the han system
