= Nakayama Tadamitsu =

Japanese nobleman (1845–1864)

- 中山忠光
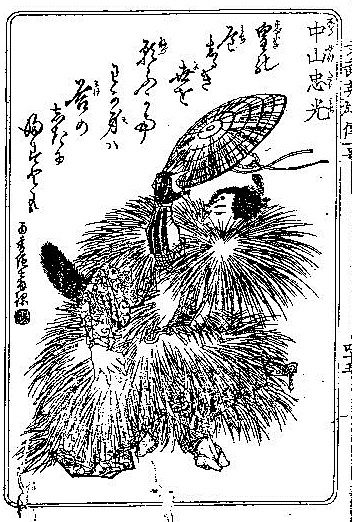
- NakayamaTadamitsu in an 1879 picture book
- Born: May 18, 1845; Kyoto, Japan
- Died: December 13, 1864 (aged 19); Shimonoseki, Yamaguchi, Japan

Nakayama Tadamitsu (中山忠光; 18 May 1845 – 13 December 1864) was a nobleman and courtier during Bakumatsu period Japan. He served briefly as Emperor Kōmei's chamberlain and is noted as the captain of Tenchū-gumi. He was the uncle of Emperor Meiji, who was born and brought up in the Nakayama household.

== Biography ==
Nakayama Tadamitsu was the seventh son of Gon Dainagon Nakayama Tadayasu. His mother, Matsura Aiko was the daughter of Matsura Kiyoshi, ninth daimyō of Hirado Domain and a famous swordsman. Emperor Meiji's biological mother, Nakayama Yoshiko, was his elder half-sister, and thus Tadamitsu was Emperor Meiji's uncle. Emperor Meiji was raised in the Nakayama household until he was five years old. Tadamitsu, who was 7 years older, spent much time with the young prince, and after the prince returned to the Imperial Court, Tadamitsu served as his attendant during studies and games. The Nakamura clan was poor and did not have the money to construct a proper birth house when the prince was born, and was forced to borrow a large sum of money. On entering the Imperial Court, Tadamitsu discovered that it was equally impoverished, and it is believed that this ignited his hatred of the Tokugawa shogunate and advocation of the Sonnō jōi movement. He had a close relationship with Takechi Hanpeita, Kusaka Genzui and Maki Yasuomi, who shared his goal of restoring the imperial house to power.

At the age of 19, he secretly left Kyoto for Chōshū Domain and changed his name to "Mōri Shunsai". Under the command of Kusaka Genzui, he participated in the Shimonoseki campaign against foreign ships in the Kanmon Strait. Later that year, he met with retainers of Mito Domain, learning about the teachings and activities of the Mito school, and later become one of the founding members and a military leader of the Tenchū-gumi, a terrorist paramilitary organization based in Gojō, Yamato Province with the aim of assassinating foreigners and attacking local offices of the Tokugawa shogunate in the Kansai region. However, when the political coup of August 18 wiped out the extremist groups in Kyoto, he was abandoned by the Imperial Court, and he was hunted down as a traitor by the soldiers of Hikone Domain and Kii Domain. In the Tenchūgumi incident, the Tenchū-gumi were eventually cornered and all but annihilated, but Tadamitsu managed to escape and made his was via Osaka back to Chōshū. Tadamitsu was entrusted to Chofū Domain, a sub-domain of Chōshū and together with two servants moved constantly incognito around the domain from village to village, sheltering in temples and in the mountains. In 1864, following the Kinmon incident and the First Chōshū expedition, five assassins from the Kyōjun faction of the Chōshū clan caught up with him and killed him. He was age 19 and six months. Chofū Domain made an official announcement that he died ten days after a brief illness in which medicines failed to work.

Nakayama Tadamitsu's grave is located within the precincts of Nakayama Jinja in what is now the city of Shimonoseki. He was initially buried at the place of the assassination, but the Tokugawa shogunate ordered that he be exhumed and taken to Hiroshima for an autopsy. The body made it as far as Shimonoseki, where it was stolen by sympathizers and buried at the present location. The current gravestone was erected in October 1934 and gives his name as "Fujiwara Tadamitsu" as the Nakamura clan was a cadet branch of the Fujiwara family. Made of granite, the 1.7 meters high monument is surrounded by a 3.6 meter square fence. The grave was designated a National Historic Site in 1941. It is about a ten-minute walk from Ayaragi Station on the JR West San'in Main Line.

His wife Tomi gave birth to a daughter, Nakayama Naka, after Tadamitsu's death. She married into the Saga family, which had close ties to the Nakayama. Her granddaughter was Hiro Saga, who married in 1937 to Pujie, the younger brother of Puyi, the last monarch of the Qing dynasty of China and the emperor of Manchukuo between 1932 and 1945.
