= Kintai Bridge =

Historical wood bridge in Iwakumi, Japan

Coordinates: 34.167603°N 132.178367°E

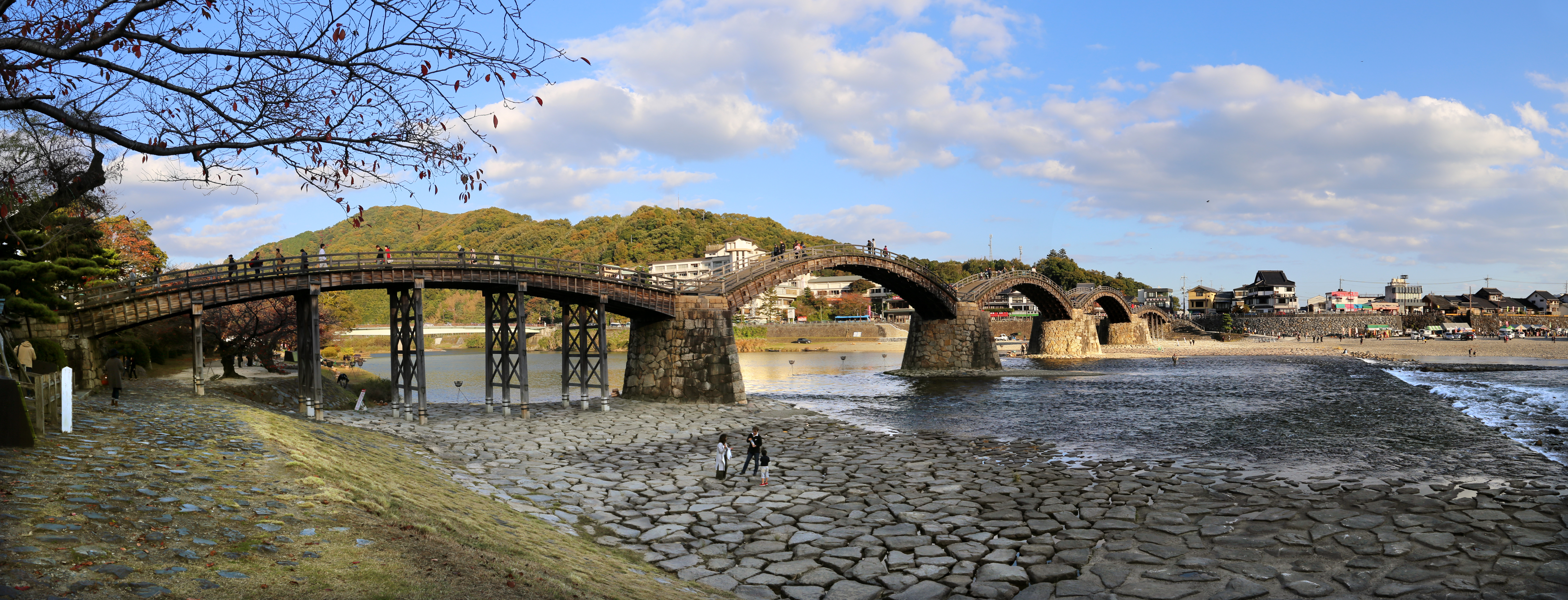
Kintai Bridge

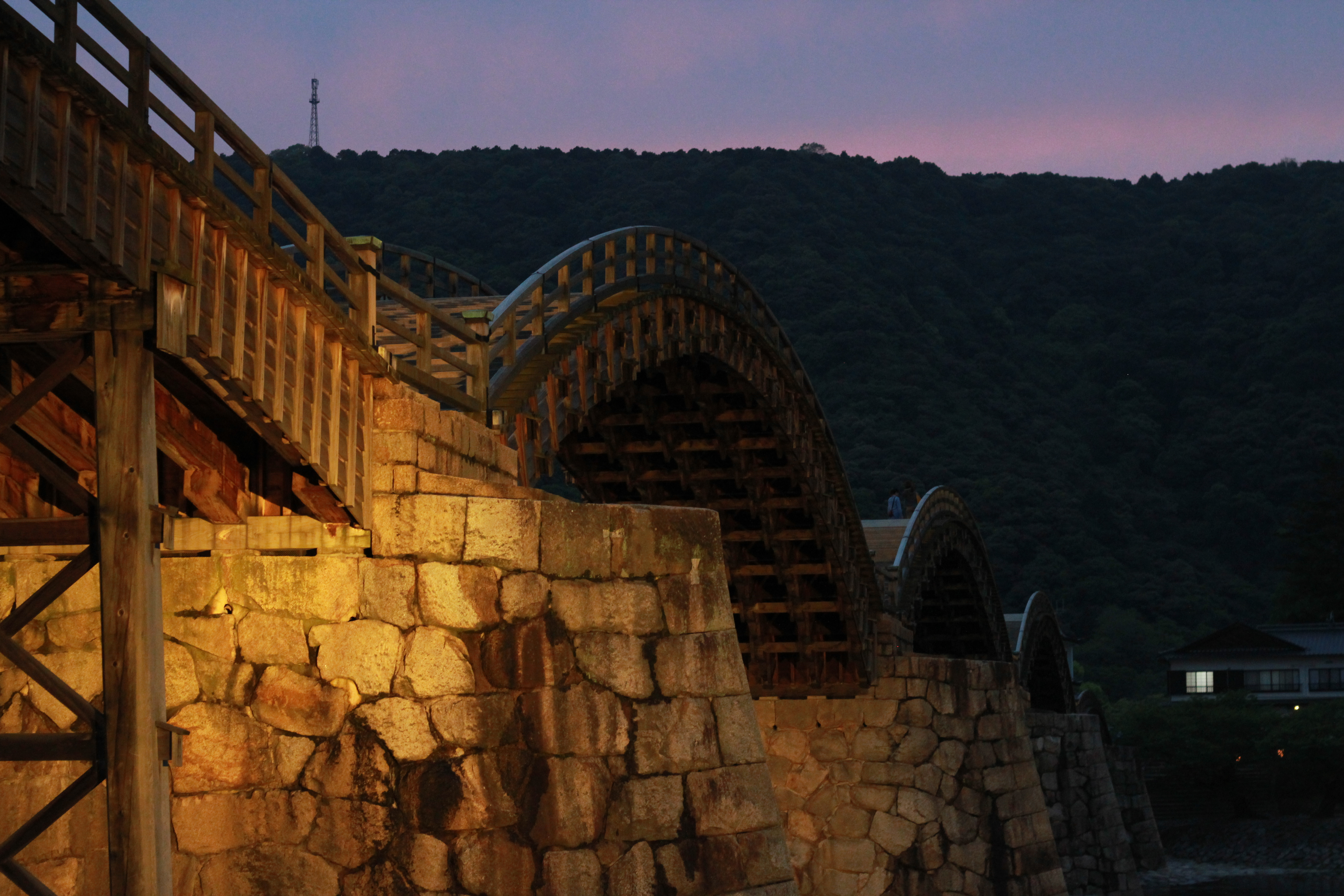
The bridge is lit up every day after sunset.

Kintai Bridge (錦帯橋, Kintai-kyō) is a historical wooden arch bridge in the city of Iwakuni in Yamaguchi Prefecture, Japan.

The pedestrian bridge was built in 1673, spanning the Nishiki River in a series of five wooden arches. The bridge is located on the foot of Mt. Yokoyama, at the top of which lies Iwakuni Castle.

Kikkou Park, which includes the bridge and castle, is a popular tourist destination in Japan, particularly during the Cherry blossom festival in the spring and the autumn color change of the Japanese maples. It was declared a National Treasure in 1922.

== History ==
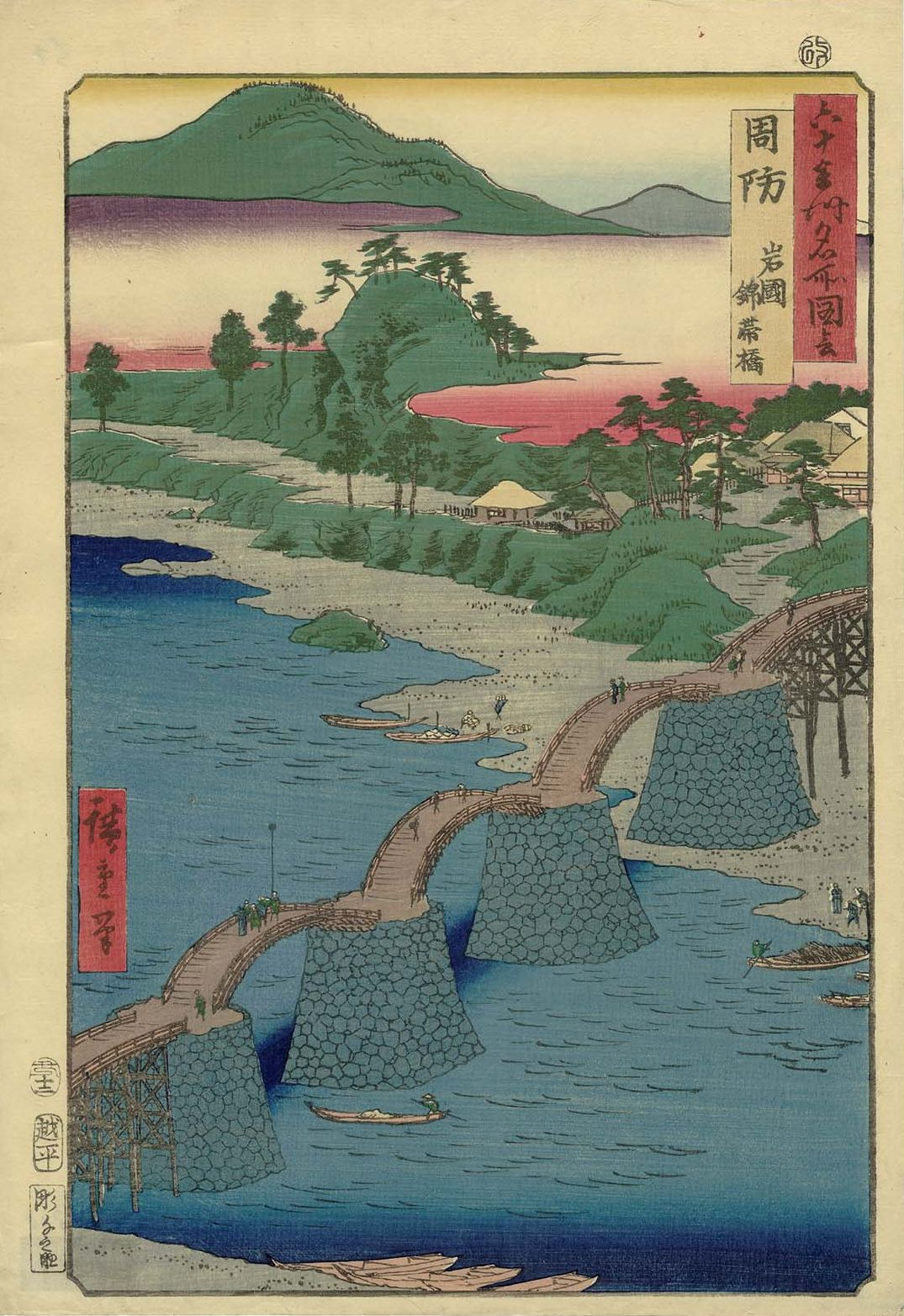
1856 woodprint of Kintai Bridge by Hiroshige, from the series Famous Views of the Sixty-odd Provinces

After Iwakuni Castle was completed in 1608 by Kikkawa Hiroie, the first lord of Iwakuni Domain, a series of wooden bridges was built. However, most of them were destroyed by floods several times before the construction of Kintai Bridge. Afterwards, Kintai Bridge was built by the third lord, Kikkawa Hiroyoshi, in 1673. The new stone piers replaced the old wooden ones. Though thought to be flood-proof, the bridge was destroyed by a flood the next year. As a result, the stone piers were redesigned for greater strength, and a special tax was created to maintain the bridge. This maintenance involved periodically rebuilding the bridge: every 20 years for three spans in the middle, every 40 years for two spans that connect to the banks.

Consequently, the footbridge remained intact for 276 years, until washed away again in a flood from typhoon Kijia in 1950. It was in a weakened state at the time, as the Japanese had stopped maintaining the bridge during World War II. In 1953, the bridge was reconstructed similar to the original.

In 1922, the bridge was declared a national treasure. Between 2001 and 2004, all five bridge girders were restored for the first time in 50 years.

== Architecture ==
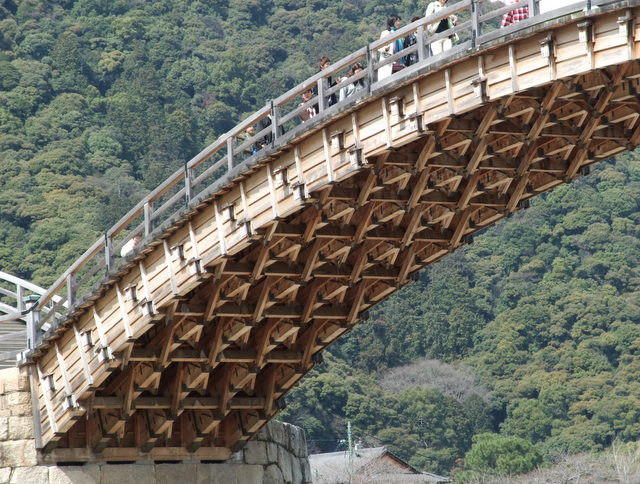
The underside of Kintai Bridge

The bridge is composed of five sequential wooden arch bridges on four stone piers as well as two wooden piers on the dry riverbed where the bridge begins and ends. Each of the three middle spans is 35.1 meters long, while the two end spans are 34.8 meters, for a total length of about 175 meters with a width of 5 meters.

=== Original construction ===
For nearly three hundred years, the many versions of the bridge stood without the use of metal nails. This was achieved by the careful fitting of the wooden parts and by the construction of the thick girders by clamping and binding them together with metal belts. The main wooden parts of the bridge were covered by sheets of copper for additional durability.

=== Flood protection ===
The shape and weight of the bridge made it extremely strong at the top, but incredibly weak from underneath. To address concern that flood waters rushing along the river would destroy the bridge in its entirety, the bridge was designed so that the wooden pathway merely "floats" on top of its frame using mortise and tenon joints. This allowed rising flood waters to lift out the wooden pathway and carry it off down stream while sparing the main structure.

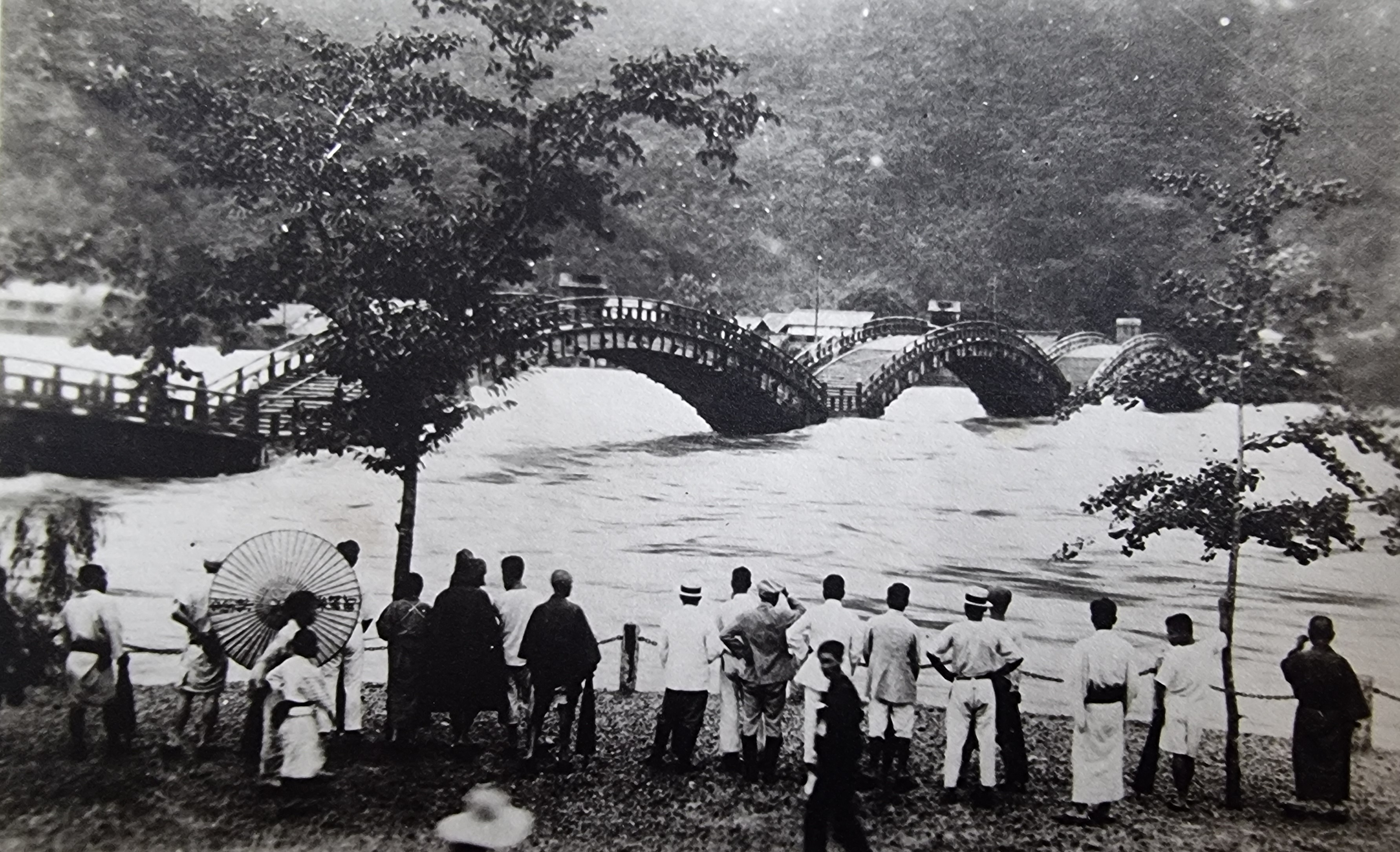
Kintai Bridge in flood, on or before 1946, photo sourced, or taken by Eric Soper, Royal Navy Signaller 2 July 1946
