= Katsuyama Goten =

Castle ruins in Shimonoseki, Yamaguchi, Japan

Katsuyama Castle
- 勝山城
- Shimonoseki, Yamaguchi Japan
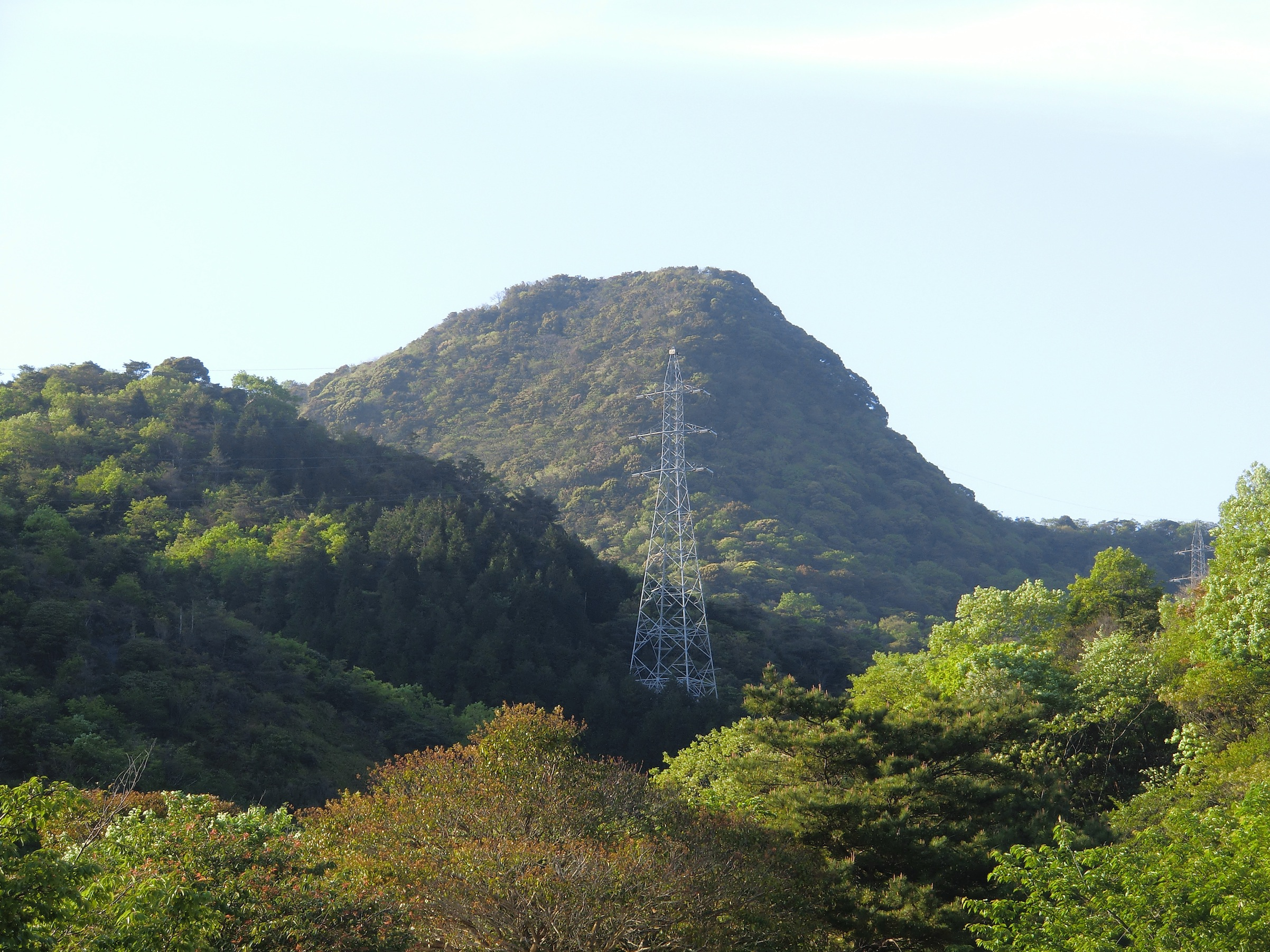
- Mount Katsuyama

Site information
- Type: Japanese castle
- Controlled by: Mōri clan
- Open to the public: yes
- Condition: Archaeological and designated national historical site; castle ruins

Location
- Coordinates: 34°01′57.5″N 130°58′12.6″E

Site history
- Built: c.1378
- In use: Sengoku - Edo period
- National Historic Site of Japan

Katsuyama Castle (勝山城, Katsuyama-jō), also known as Katsuyama Goten (勝山御殿, Katsuyama-goten) was a Japanese castle located in the city of Shimonoseki, Yamaguchi Prefecture, Japan.The castle is a natural stronghold utilizing Mount Katsuyama, which is 400 meters above sea level. In addition to more than a dozen baileys on the summit ridge, there are also bailey-like structures at the foot of the mountain.During the Bakumatsu period, the fortified residence of the lord of Chōfu Domain, a branch domain of Chōshū Domain, was built at the foot of Mount Katsuyama during the late Edo period. The site of this residence has been protected as a National Historic Site since 2019.

== Katsuyama Castle ==
Katsuyama Castle was a multi-bailey yamajiro-style mountain castle built on the summit of Mount Katsuyama. The exact date of its construction is unknown, but it is said to have been built in 1378 by Nagatomi Tsugumitsu, a retainer of the Ōuchi clan, the powerful shugo daimyō of Nagato Province. In 1521, Naito Okimori, a senior retainer of the Ōuchi clan, took up residence in Katsuyama as a defense against Kyushu. However, in 1527, a conflict arose between him and Takamori Masatomo, the lord of the nearby Aoyama Castle. Takamori, with the support of Tsuhara Zenkatsu and Tsuda Okiteru, surrounded Katsuyama Castle with an army of 12,000 men. However, the Ōuchi clan joined forces with Naito, bringing their army to 35,000. Naito's forces launched a counterattack and captured Aoyama at the Battle of Katsuyama-Aoyama. Following his victory at the Battle of Itsukushima in 1555, Mōri Motonari invaded Suō and Nagato provinces. In March 1557, Ōuchi Yoshinaga abandoned his stronghold at Yamaguchi Takamine Castle and fled west, taking refuge in this castle with Naito Takayo. Motonari besieged the strategically important Katsuyama Castle and, in exchange for Takayo's seppuku, allowed Yoshinaga to surrender. Afterward, Yoshinaga left Katsuyama Castle and entered Chofuku-ji temple, but Fukubara Sadatoshi broke his promise and besieged it, forcing Yoshinaga to commit suicide as well.

== Katsuyama Goten ==
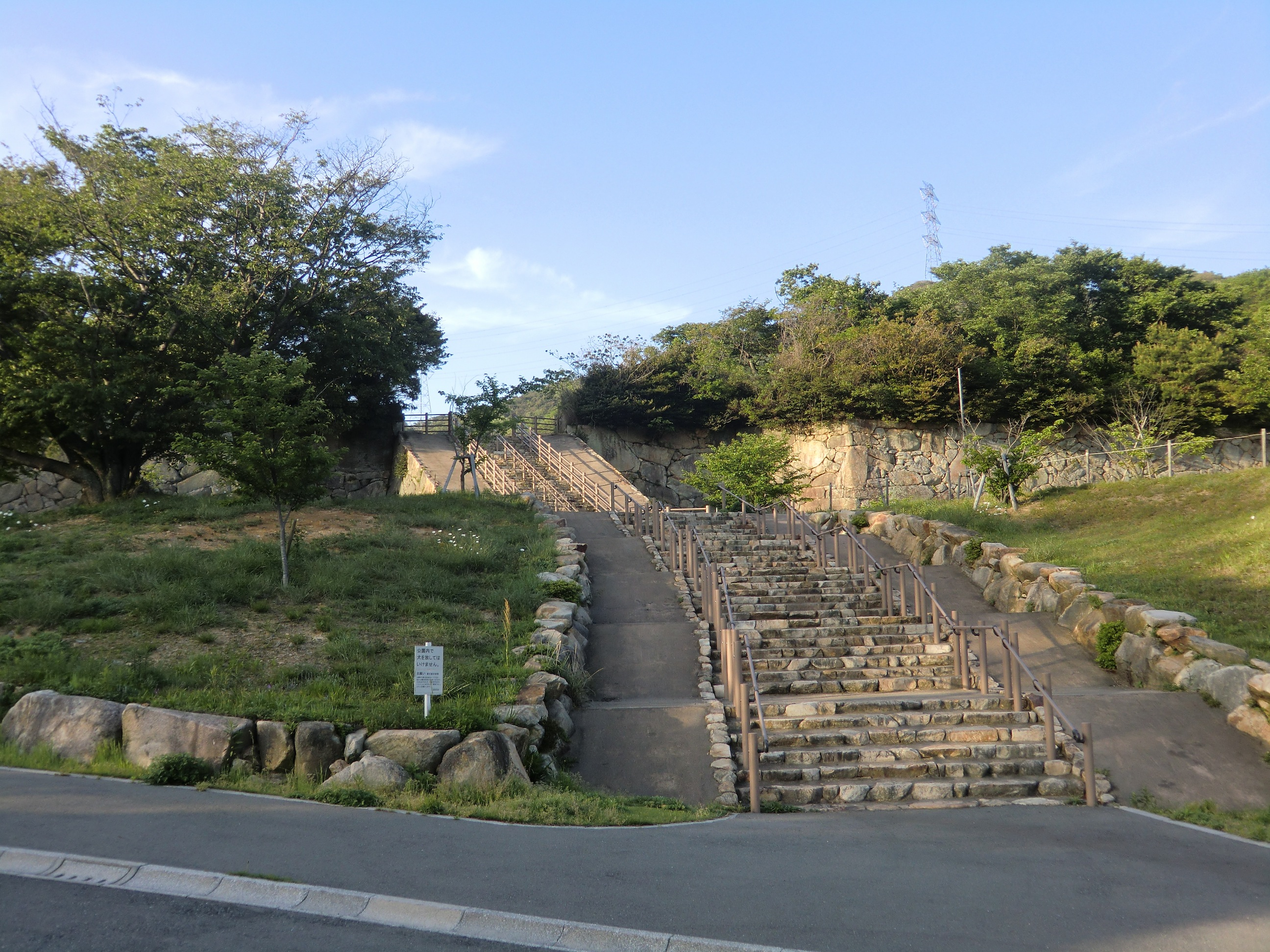
Site of Katsuyama Goten

In May 1863, Chōshū Domain began shelling foreign ships passing through the Kanmon Strait, but was subsequently attacked in retaliation by foreign warships in June (Shimonoseki War). The Chōfu Mōri clan residence (Kushizaki Castle) was located on the coast near the Kanmon Strait, and due to its location Mōri Motochika decided to move the residence inland. Through a rushed construction project carried out from June 28 of the same year to the following year, the Katsuyama Goten was built at the foot of Mount Katsuyama, and on February 1, 1864, it became the official domain residence. After the Meiji restoration, it served for a time as the Toyoura Prefectural Office before being dismantled in 1873. Some of the building materials were salvaged and became the living quarters and guest hall of the temple of Kakuen-ji. The stone walls of the main bailey remained in good condition.

Katsuyama Goten was built in a valley at the southern foot of Mount Katsuyama. Although styled as a "palace" (goten), it had the structure of a flatlands-style Japanese castle. The main keep was located on the north side, backed by the mountains, with the second and third baileys facing south, creating a multi-bailey structure. The main enclosure (Honmaru) was further divided into two sections, north and south. The northern (innermost) section, where the lord's family lived, was called the "Okunoin" (inner sanctuary), while the southern section was the "Omote" (front), where official duties were conducted. The inner and outer sections of the Honmaru were separated by a stone wall and a moat, but a covered walkway connected them. Archaeological excavations have uncovered the buried ramparts of the second and third baileys, as well as the foundations of the Honmaru Palace. The layout had no yagura watchtowers. as there provided tartets for artillery fire, and the ramparts were also designed artillery warfare in mind.

By 2009, the site had been developed into Katsuyama District Park.

== See also ==
- List of Historic Sites of Japan (Yamaguchi)

== Literature ==
- Benesch, Oleg and Ran Zwigenberg (2019). Japan's Castles: Citadels of Modernity in War and Peace. Cambridge: Cambridge University Press. p. 374. ISBN 9781108481946.
- De Lange, William (2021). An Encyclopedia of Japanese Castles. Groningen: Toyo Press. pp. 600 pages. ISBN 978-9492722300.
