= Kunishi Shinano =

Japanese samurai

Kunishi Shinano (国司 信濃; July 22, 1842 – December 9, 1864) was a Japanese samurai in the service of the daimyō Mōri Takachika of Chōshū as a senior retainer. Also known as Tomosuke (朝相), Chikasuke (親相), and Kumanosuke (熊之助). Second son of Chōshū retainer Takasu Mototada, he was adopted by the heirless Kunishi Michinori (5600 koku stipend). Succeeded to family headship in 1847, serving in the clan administration as Ōkumigashira (大組頭). He was known for wisdom beyond his years, and thus in 1863 was appointed as an autopsy director under another Chōshū retainer, Nagai Gagaku.

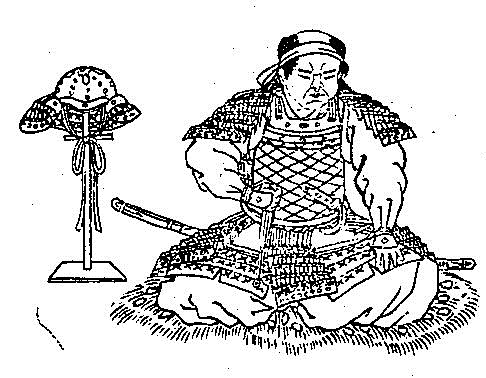
Kunishi Shinano as illustrated in 1880

In May 1863, he joined Kusaka Genzui and others in the bombing of an American warship. Rewarded for this success, he was made director of defenses at Shimonoseki. But in August, because of political issues, Chōshū was driven out of Kyoto, and at the same time, he was promoted to the status of senior retainer. Though he led a punitive force to Kyoto along with Masuda Kanenobu, Fukuhara Echigo, and Kijima Matabei, they were turned around by the combined Aizu-Satsuma army, and forced to retreat to Chōshū.

The First Anti-Chōshū Expedition soon followed, led by Tokugawa Yoshikatsu of the Owari domain and Saigō Takamori of Satsuma. Eventually, with the Shogunate forcing Chōshū to submit, three men were chosen to take responsibility for the domain's actions: Masuda, Kunishi, and Fukuhara; all three men committed suicide, with Kunishi Shinano's being at Chōsenji Temple, ending his life at the young age of 22.
