= Iwakuni Domain =

Administrative division in western Japan during the Edo period (1600-1871)

Iwakuni Domain 岩国藩
- Domain of Japan
- 1600–1871
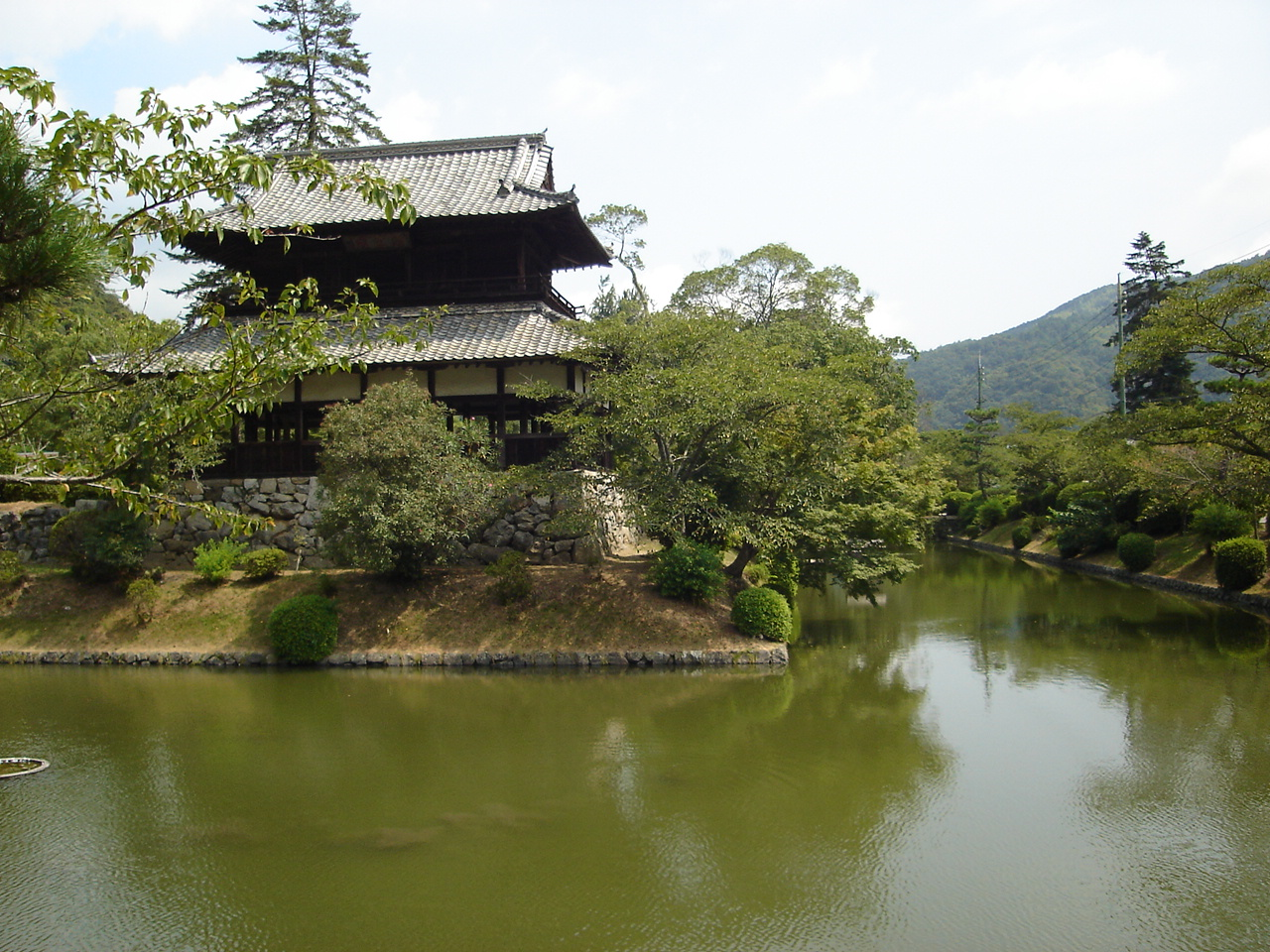
- Kin-un-kaku pavilon in Iwakuni, Yamaguchi

- Mon of the Kikkawa clan
- Capital: Iwakuni Castle
- Area
  - Coordinates: 4°10′30.92″N 132°10′27.23″E
- Historical era: Edo period
  - Established: 1600
  - Abolition of the han system: 1871
- Contained within
  - Province: Suō Province
- Today part of: Yamaguchi Prefecture

Location of Iwakuni Castle
Iwakuni Domain (Japan)

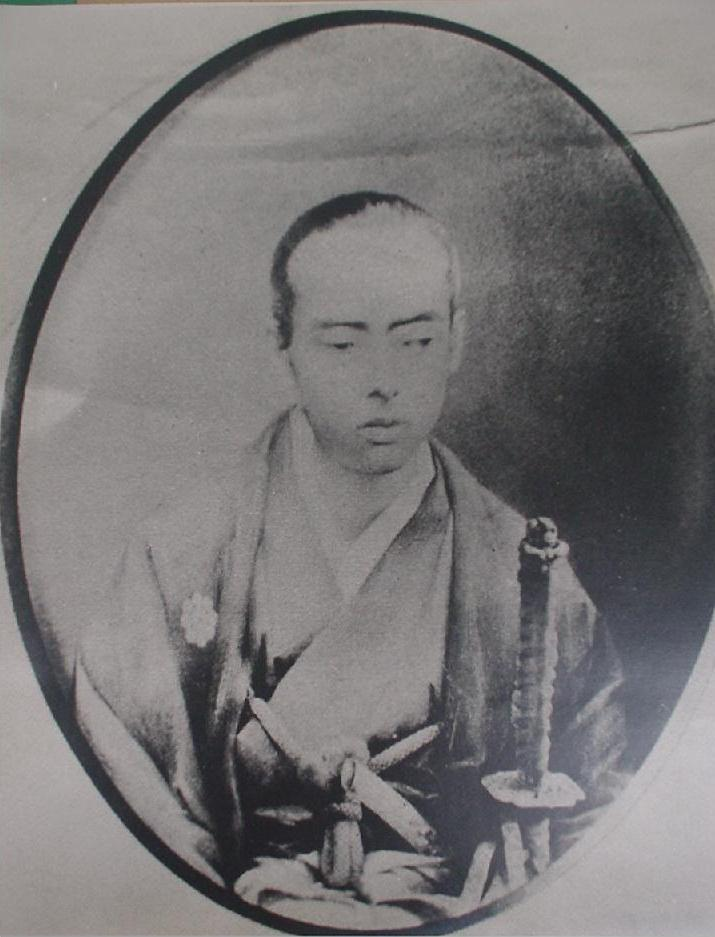
Kikkawa Tsunemasa, daimyo of Iwakuni

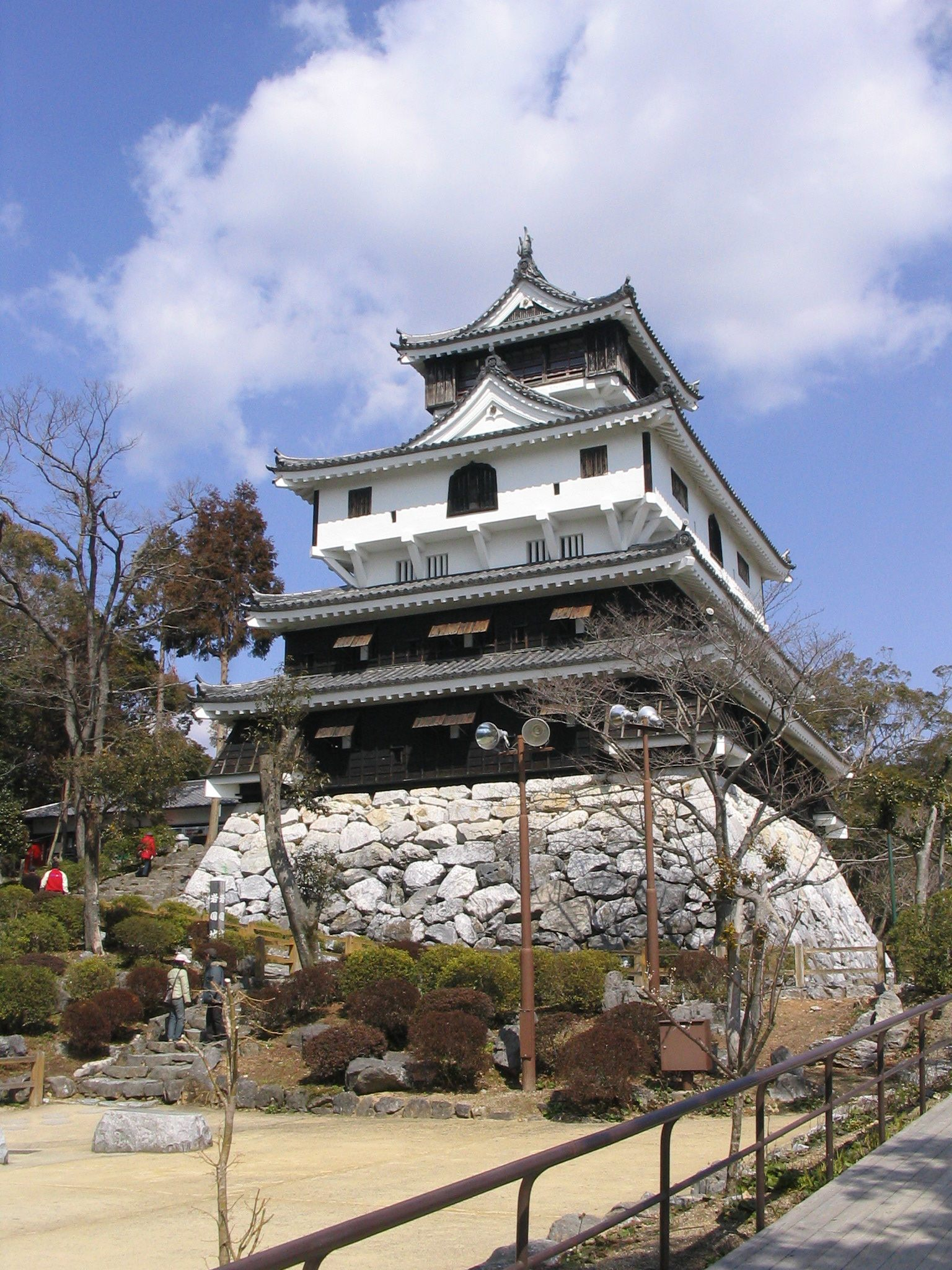
Reconstructed tenshu of Iwakuni Castle

Iwakuni Domain (岩国藩, Iwakuni-han) was a feudal domain under the Tokugawa shogunate of Edo period Japan, in what is now southeastern Yamaguchi Prefecture. It was centered around Iwakuni jin'ya and was ruled throughout its history the Kikkawa clan. Iwakuni Domain was dissolved in the abolition of the han system in 1871.

== History ==
Kikkawa Hiroie was the grandson of Mōri Motonari. At the Battle of Sekigahara in 1600, Kikkawa Hiroie secretly communicated with Tokugawa Ieyasu, providing the Eastern Army with vital intelligence and blocked the movement of Mōri clan forces, preventing them from entering into combat. Despite this, after the battle, Ieyasu was determined to destroy the Mōri clan, as they controlled ten provinces in western Japan. Kikkawa Hiroie negotiated a settlement which enabled the Mōri to retain at least the two provinces of Suō and Nagato, even though this cost him his own fief in Izumo Province of 140,000 koku. In return, the Mōri granted him the area around Iwakuni, with an assessed kokudaka of 30,000 koku, which was later increased to 60,000 koku. In 1615, Iwakuni Castle was demolished according to the one country, one castle ordinance issued by the shogunate, and a jin'ya was constructed as the clan residence at the base of the mountain where the castle was located.

Iwakuni Domain was nominally a sub-domain of Chōshū Domain and was not recognized by the shogunate and an official domain; the Kikkawa clan was not subject to sankin kōtai and was not given the title of daimyō. They were also denied the courtesy titles and nominal court ranks normally granted to daimyō. However, the clan did maintain a residence in Edo as they had to make tributes of the four seasons to the Shogun and had to visit Edo Castle for a formal audience on the succession of each clan chieftain. During these audiences, they were placed in the same Yanagi-no-ma chamber together with small and middle-ranked tozama daimyō. For all practical purposes the domain was independent of Chōshū Domain, and Chōshū Domain officially referred to the domain as "Iwakuni Territory". The Mōri regarded the Kikkawa as their retainers despite the fact that the Tokogawa shogunate granted them special consideration. Due to this ambiguous position, relations were often strained between Chōshū and Iwakuni until near the end of the Bakumatsu period.

Kikkawa Hiroie died in 1625 and his son Kikkawa Hiromasa became daimyō. He tried to keep independent of Chōshū and has a falling out with Mōri Hidenari in 1634. In 1640, he established paper-making as a domain monopoly to raise funds. His son and successor Kikkawa Hiroyoshi devoted himself to cultural projects, and in 1673 the famous Kintaikyō Bridge. Kikkawa Hironori, the fourth daimyō, engaged in extensive land reclamation projects and under his management, the domain became very prosperous. This further aroused the envy of Chōshū, which was suffering from financial difficulties. During the tenure of Kikkawa Hiroyoshi and Kikkawa Tsunenaga, the fifth and sixth daimyō, the conflict worsened. Under the seventh daimyō, an unsuccessful effort to obtain official recognition as an independent domain failed, and finances deteriorated due to poor harvests. Conditions fluctuated in the late Edo period, but the 10th daimyō, Kikkawa Yoshikawa succeeded in financial reforms by carrying out land reclamation projects. In the early Bakumatsu period, although there were a number of Sonnō jōi incidents, the domain initially supported the shogunate. During the Chōshū expeditions, Kikkawa Tsunemoto, the 12th daimyō acted as mediator between Chōshū Domain and the shogunate. This was regarded by some members of Chōshū (such as Takasugi Shinsaku) as a betrayal. However, during the Boshin War, the domain fought against the shogunate and contributed to the Meiji restoration.

On March 13, 1868, after the Taisei Hōkan, the Iwakuni Domain was officially recognized as an independent domain by the new Meiji government. Kikkawa Tsunemoto was recognized as an official daimyō. On July 14, 1871 Iwakuni Domain became "Iwakuni Prefecture" due to the abolition of the han system, and was subsequently incorporated into Yamaguchi Prefecture on November 15 of the same year. The Kikkawa family was granted the rank of shishaku (viscount) in the kazoku peerage in 1884.

== Holdings at the end of the Edo period ==
As with most domains in the han system, Iwakuni Domain consisted of several discontinuous territories calculated to provide the assigned kokudaka, based on periodic cadastral surveys and projected agricultural yields, g.

- Suō Province
  - 2 villages in Ōshima District
  - 84 villages in Kuga District

== List of daimyō ==
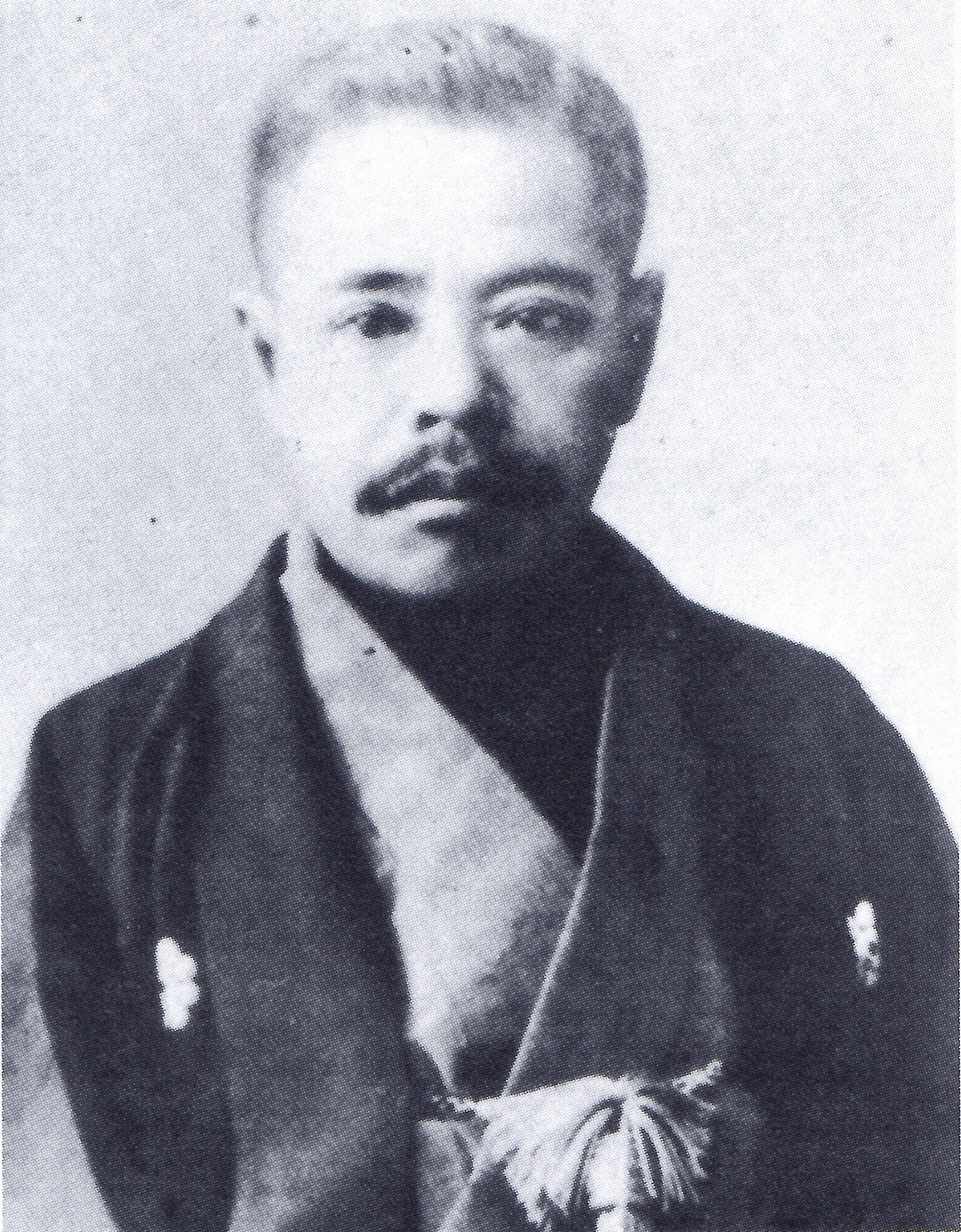
Kikkawa Tsunetake

#	Name	Tenure	Courtesy title	Court Rank	kokudaka
Kikkawa clan, 1603-1697 (Tozama)
1	Kikkawa Hiroie (吉川広家)	1600 - 1614	Minbu-no-shō, Jijū (民部少輔、侍従)	Junior 4th Rank, Lower Grade (従四位下)	30,000->60,000 koku
2	Kikkawa Hiromasa (吉川広正)	1614 - 1663	Kura-no-suke (内蔵助)	Junior 4th Rank, Lower Grade (従四位下)	60,000 koku
3	Kikkawa Hiroyoshi (吉川広嘉)	1663 - 1679	-none-	Junior 4th Rank, Lower Grade (従四位下)	60,000 koku
4	Kikkawa Hironori (吉川広紀)	1679 - 1696	-none-	Junior 4th Rank, Lower Grade (従四位下)	60,000 koku
5	Kikkawa Hiromichi (吉川広逵)	1696 - 1715	-none-	Junior 4th Rank, Lower Grade (従四位下)	60,000 koku
6	Kikkawa Tsunenaga (吉川経永)	1715 - 1764	-none-	Junior 4th Rank, Lower Grade (従四位下)	60,000 koku
7	Kikkawa Tsunetomo (吉川経倫)	1764 - 1792	-none-	Junior 4th Rank, Lower Grade (従四位下)	60,000 koku
8	Kikkawa Tsunetada (吉川経忠)	1792 - 1803	-none-	Junior 4th Rank, Lower Grade (従四位下)	60,000 koku
9	Kikkawa Tsunekata (吉川経賢)	1803 - 1806	-none-	Junior 4th Rank, Lower Grade (従四位下)	60,000 koku
10	Kikkawa Tsunehiro (吉川経礼)	1807 - 1836	-none-	Junior 4th Rank, Lower Grade (従四位下)	60,000 koku
11	Kikkawa Tsuneakira (吉川経章)	1836 - 1843	-none-	Junior 4th Rank, Lower Grade (従四位下)	60,000 koku
12	Kikkawa Tsunemasa (吉川経幹)	1843 - 1867	Suruga-no-kami (駿河守)	Junior 5th Rank, Lower Grade (従五位下)	60,000 koku
13 (1)	Kikkawa Tsunemasa (吉川経幹)	1843 - 1868	Suruga-no-kami (駿河守)	Junior 5th Rank, Lower Grade (従五位下)	60,000 koku
14 (2)	Kikkawa Tsunetake (吉川経健)	1868 - 1871	Suruga-no-kami (駿河守)	Junior 4th Rank, Lower Grade (従四位下)	30,000 koku

== See also ==
- List of Han
- Abolition of the han system
