= Kijima Matabē =

Kijima Matabē (来島 又兵衛, February 23, 1817 – August 20, 1864), also known as Masahisa (政久), was a Japanese samurai who served as a retainer to Lord Mōri of Chōshū. Though his name was Masahisa, he is known by his "common" name of Matabē. While his income (a stipend of 59 koku) may not have been particularly high, his voice was certainly one closest to the ear of the daimyō. Though he was born into the unstipended Kitamura clan (the clan messengers/couriers), he was adopted by Kijima Masatsune, the head of another Chōshū retainer family. Matabee became greatly renowned for his martial skill, both in Chōshū and in Edo, owing to his many trips accompanying Lord Mōri. He studied swordsmanship and spearmanship with Ōishi Susumu of the Yanagawa domain, horsemanship with the Hagi-based Narasaki Shirōbei, as well as training in Edo at the dōjō of Kubota Sukeshirō.

Following the Ikedaya Incident (July 1864), where the Aizu domain-sponsored Shinsengumi attacked and defeated around 20 (mostly) Chōshū samurai who were plotting to burn Kyoto to the ground, Kijima was one of those along with senior Chōshū retainer Kokuji Shinano who led the advance of Chōshū forces to Kyoto in retaliation. However, when he led his forces from Tenryū-ji Temple (in the wooded hills west of Kyoto) to the Forbidden Gates of the Imperial palace, the Aizu force gunned his unit down, and he was forced to have his nephew Kitamura Takeshichi help him commit suicide.

== Sources ==
- Brief biography of Kijima Matabee
- Background on Matabee, as well as the Kijima and Kitamura families
- Extended biography of Matabee
