= Kiyosue Domain =

Japanese domain of the Edo period

Kiyosue Domain 清末藩
- Domain of Japan
- 1653–1871
- Capital: Kiyosue jin'ya
  - Type: Daimyō
- Historical era: Edo period
  - Established: 1653
  - Disestablished: 1871
- Today part of: Yamaguchi Prefecture

The Kiyosue Domain (清末藩, Kiyosue-han) was a Japanese domain of the Edo period, located in Nagato Province. It was ruled for the entirety of its history by a branch of the Mōri clan of the neighboring Chōshū Domain.

== List of lords ==
- Mōri clan (Tozama; 10,000 koku)
1. Mototomo
2. Motohira
3. Masanari
4. Masakuni
5. Masaaki
6. Motoyo
7. Mototsugu
8. Motozumi
