= Kinmon incident =

1864 Japanese rebellion

Coordinates: 35°01′23″N 135°45′35″E

Kinmon incident 禁門の変・蛤御門の変
- Part of Bakumatsu conflicts
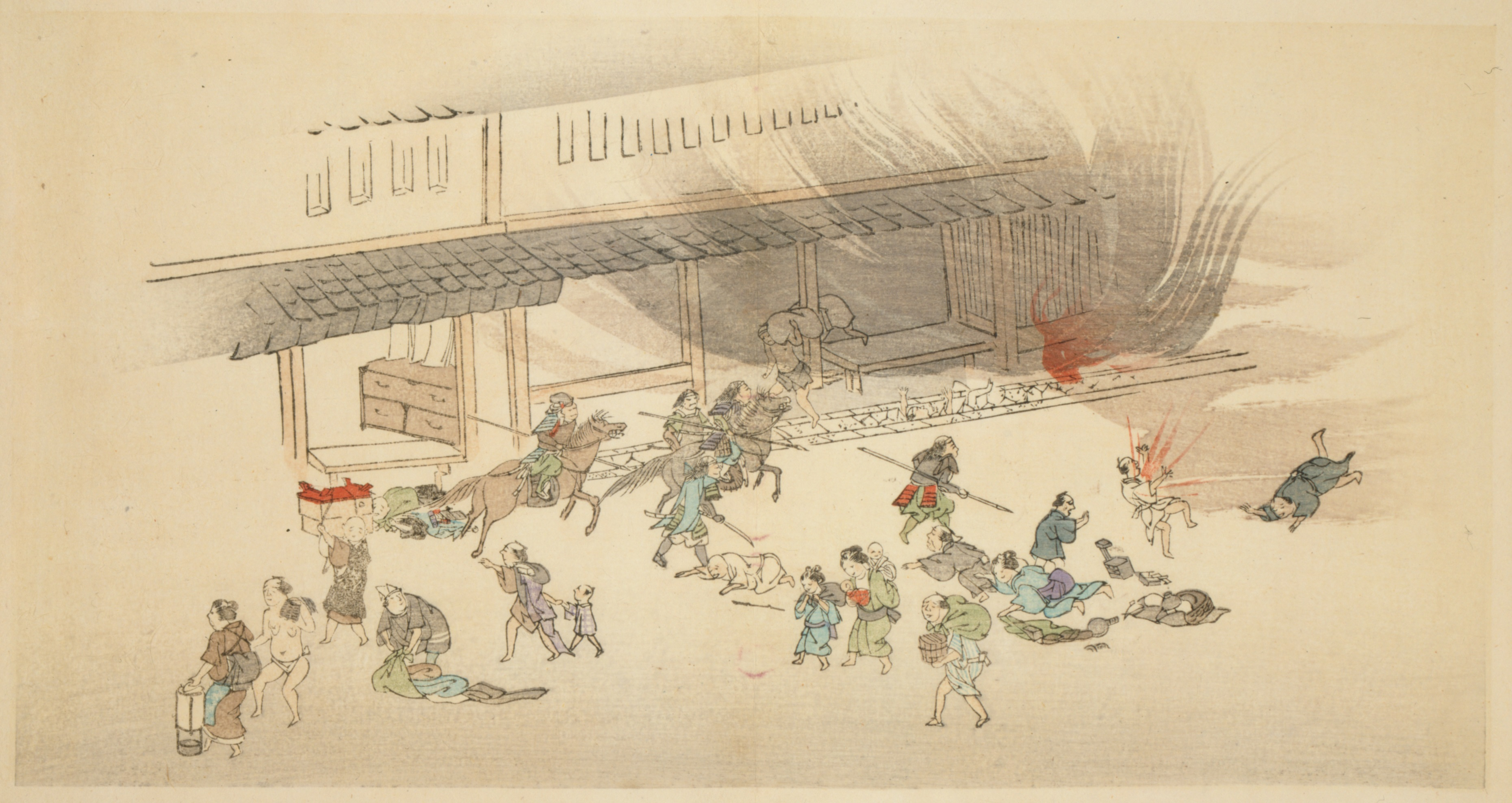
- An 1893 woodblock print by Yūzan Mori, depicting the Hamaguri rebellion.
| Date | 20 August 1864 |
| Location | Kyoto |
| Result | Tokugawa victory |

Belligerents
| Chōshū Domain; Sonnō jōi rōnin force | Tokugawa shogunate; Aizu Domain; Satsuma Domain; Mito Domain; Owari Domain; Kii Domain; Kuwana Domain; Ōgaki Domain; Echizen Domain; Hikone Domain; Yodo Domain; Asao Domain; Shinsengumi; Mimawarigumi; Yūgekitai |

Commanders and leaders
| Fukuhara Echigo | Tokugawa Yoshinobu |

Strength
| 3,000 men (1,400 Chōshū army + 1,600 rōnin force) | 50,000 men |

Casualties and losses
| 400 killed or wounded | 60 killed or wounded, 28,000 houses burnt down |
- Location within Japan

The Kinmon incident (禁門の変, Kinmon no Hen; "Forbidden Gate Incident" or "Imperial Palace Gate Incident"), also known as the Hamaguri Gate Rebellion (蛤御門の変, Hamaguri Gomon no Hen; "Hamaguri Imperial Gate Incident"), was a rebellion against the Tokugawa shogunate in Japan that took place on 20 August [lunar calendar: 19th day, 7th month], 1864, near the Imperial Palace in Kyoto.

== History ==
Starting with the Convention of Kanagawa in 1854, within a few years foreign powers forced the shogun dynasty to abandon its isolationist policy (sakoku). The rebellion reflected the widespread discontent felt among both pro-imperial/anti-shogunate and anti-foreigner groups, who rebelled under the sonnō jōi ("revere the emperor, expel the barbarians") slogan. Emperor Kōmei had issued an "Order to expel barbarians". Thus, in March 1863, the shishi rebels sought to take control of the Emperor to restore the Imperial household to its position of political supremacy.

During what was a bloody crushing of the rebellion, the leading Chōshū clan was held responsible for its instigation. To counter the rebels' kidnapping attempt, armies of the Aizu and Satsuma domains (the latter led by Saigo Takamori) led the defense of the Imperial palace. However, during the attempt, the rebels set Kyoto on fire, starting with the residence of the Takatsukasa family, and that of a Chōshū official. It is unknown if the rebels set fire to Kyoto as soon as they began to lose, or if their doing so was part of their original strategy, and done as a diversionary tactic. Among the shishi who died in the incident was Kusaka Genzui.

Various courtiers, including Nakayama Tadayasu, the Emperor's Special Consultant for National Affairs, were banished from Court as a result of their involvement in this incident. Sanjō Sanetomi, due to his association with many of the shishi that were captured, executed or identified during the rebellion, was forced to flee. The shogunate followed the incident with a retaliatory armed expedition, the First Chōshū expedition, in September 1864.
