= Famous Views of the Sixty-odd Provinces =

Series of ukiyo-e prints by Utagawa Hiroshige

Kozuke Province
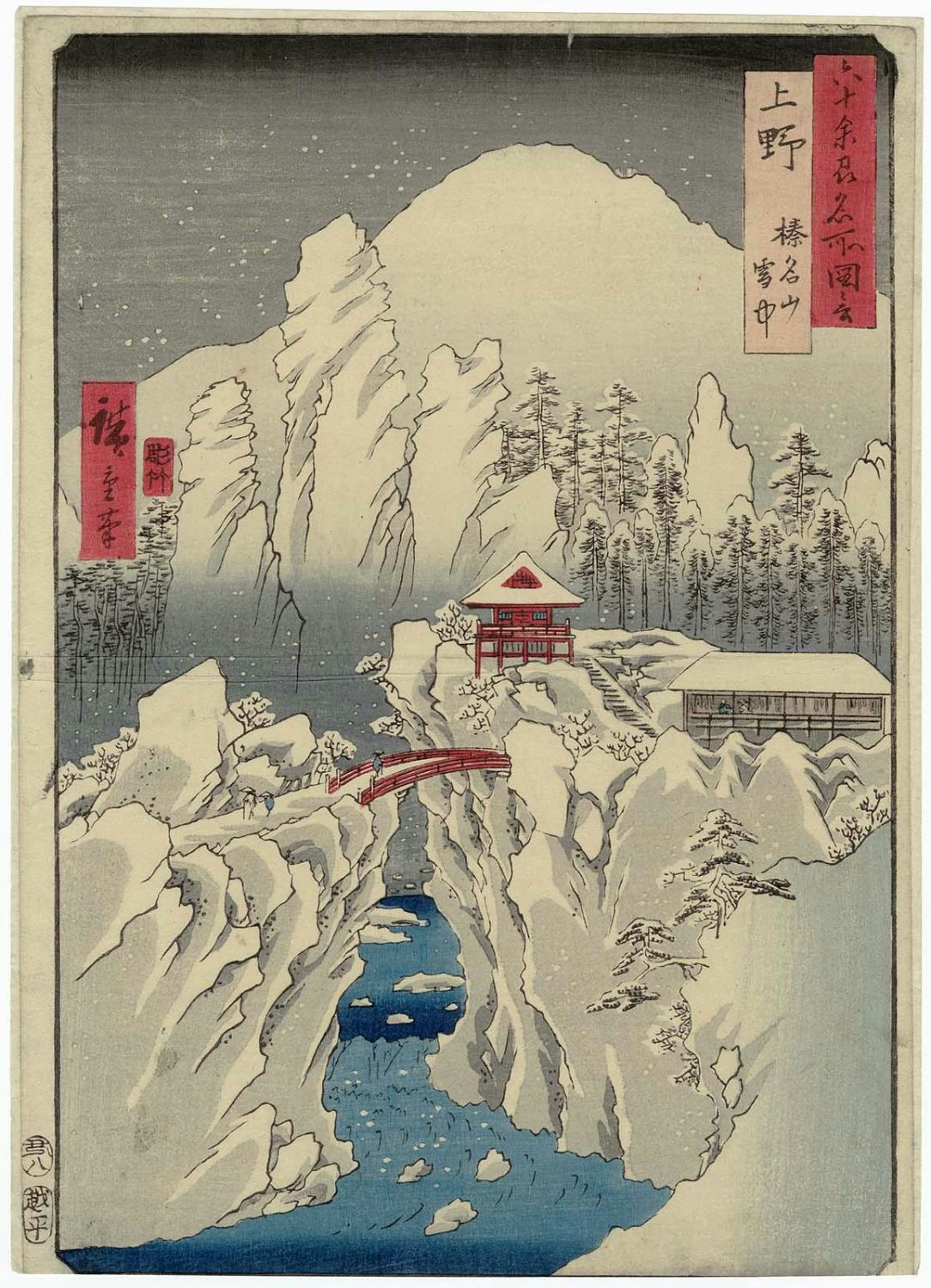
- Artist: Hiroshige
- Year: 1853–56
- Type: ukiyo-e

Famous Views of the Sixty-odd Provinces (in Japanese 六十余州名所図会 Rokujūyoshū Meisho Zue) is a series of ukiyo-e prints by the Japanese artist Hiroshige (1797–1858). The series consists of a print of a famous view from each of the 68 provinces of Japan plus a print of Edo, the capital, and a contents page for a total of 70 prints. The prints were first published in serialized form by Koshimuraya Heisuke in 1853–56.

== History ==
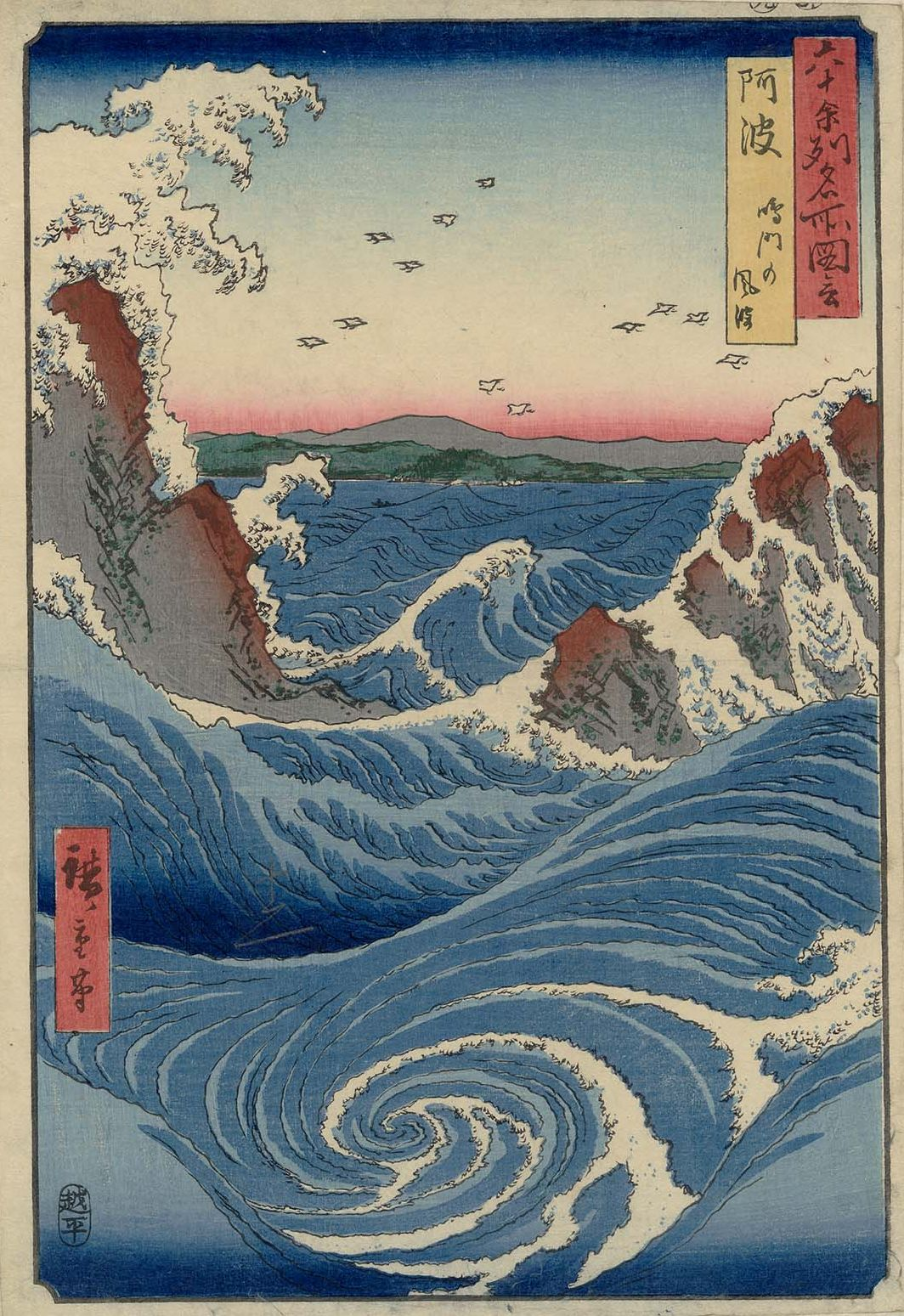
Naruto Whirlpools, Awa Province, 1855 Hirosige

Hiroshige started the series in the seventh month of Kaei 6 (Sept 1853) and completed it in the third month of Ansei 3 (May 1856). The first 42 prints were completed and published in 1853. Thereafter, Hiroshige slowed down the pace of publishing: Buzen Province, listed as the 61st print, was issued in 1854; another seventeen were published in the 9th month of 1855; and the final nine prints in the third to fifth months of 1856.

A contents page was also published in 1856 after the final prints; The ordering of the prints on the contents page differs slightly from the actual print publication ordering. The new ordering on the contents page grouped the prints according to the 8 travel routes in Old Japan.

Hiroshige based many of his designs on old Japanese guidebooks called meishō zue. In particular, at least 26 of the designs are believed to have been based on drawings from the 8 volume series of guidebooks called Sansui Kikan (Exceptional Mountain and Water Landscapes) written and illustrated by Fuchigami Kyokkō (淵上旭江) (1753–1816) published by Yanagihara Kihei from 1800–1802. As well as several from drawings in the early volumes of the Hokusai Manga (北斎漫画; "Hokusai's Sketches") series.

A deluxe edition featuring bokashi—additional overprinting to enrich the design—was produced as an initial run to publicize the series. Subsequent print runs tended to limit or eliminate the overprinting which was relatively costly to produce.

== Format and design ==
The series uses a vertical (立て絵, tate-e) layout for each of the prints. The size was the vertical ôban: 35.6 x 24.8 cm (14 x 9 3/4 in.)

This was the first time such a format had been used in a major Japanese landscape print series. A likely reason for Hiroshige's choice was that rather than travel to the actual locations, he based many of his designs on Meisho Zue guidebooks which used a vertical, rather than horizontal, format. It is also speculated by scholars that a vertical format would have been a strong marketing ploy at the time and a better binding of such a large number of prints.

The topics for the designs were famous places seen from the vantage point of a local. There is one print for each of the 68 provinces that existed at the time of the series. The print designs document a world that was about to change: A few months after the first prints were published the Black Ships that contributed to the opening of Japan arrived and just over a decade after the completion of the series, in 1872, the Meiji Restoration would rewrite the provincial boundaries that had existed since 824AD.

In addition to the prints of the provinces, there is a single print of Asakusa Fair in Edo, the capital of Japan at the time. This print would be a harbinger of Hiroshige's One Hundred Famous Views of Edo the start of which overlapped with the final prints of this series.

== Key ==
- No.: number of the print
- Title: as it appears on the print together with English translation and Japanese reading
- Depicted: major landmarks that appear in the print listed in order of increasing distance from the viewer
- Date: publication year and month (in the pre-1873 Japanese lunisolar calendar) according to the date seal; intercalary months are preceded with "i"
- Location: place and coordinates of the viewpoint. The coordinates are approximate—typically the coordinates of a picture element as a proxy for the viewpoint.
- Image: a picture of the print

== Prints ==
No.	Province	Depicted	Date	Location	Image
1	Yamashiro (山城)	The Togetsu Bridge in Arashiyama (あらし山 渡月橋, Arasiyama Togetsukyou)	1853 / 7	Yamashiro Province 35°00′46″N 135°40′40″E	
2	Yamato (大和)	Tatsuta Mountain and Tatsuta River (立田山 龍田川, Tatsuta-san Tatsuta-gawa)	1853 / 7	Yamato Province 34°37′0″N 135°44′0″E	
3	Kawachi (河内)	Mount Otoko in Hirakata (枚方 男山)	1853 / 07	Kawachi Province 34°49′0″N 135°39′0″E	
4	Izumi (和泉)	Takashi Beach (高師のはま)	1853 / 7	Izumi Province 34°31′56″N 135°25′41″E	
5	Settsu (摂津)	Sumiyoshi, Idemi Beach (住よし 出見のはま, Sumiyoshi, Idemi no hama)	1853 / 7	Settsu Province 34°36′46″N 135°29′35″E	
6	Iga (伊賀)	Ueno (上野)	1853 / 7	Iga Province 34°46′12.33″N 136°7′37.9″E	
7	Ise (伊勢)	Mount Asama, Teahouses on the Mountain Pass (朝熊山 峠の茶屋, Asamasan-tōge no chaya)	1853 / 7	Ise Province 34°27′22″N 136°47′10″E	
8	Shima (志摩)	Mount Hiyori and Toba Harbor (日和山 鳥羽湊, Hiyoriyama Toba minato)	1853 / 7	Shima Province 34°29′06″N 136°50′25″E	
9	Owari (尾張)	Tsushima, Tenno Festival (津嶋 天王祭り, Tsushima Ten'nō matsuri)	1853 / 7	Owari Province 35°10′37.4″N 136°44′28.6″E	
10	Mikawa (三河)	Horai Temple Mountains (鳳来寺山巌, Hōraijisan Iwao)	1853 / 8	Mikawa Province 34°58′44.2″N 137°35′10.3″E	
11	Totomi (遠江)	Lake Hamana, Kanzan Temple in Horie and the Inasa-Horie Inlet (濱名之湖 堀江館山寺 引佐之細江, Hamana no mizuumi Horie Kanzanji Inasa no Hosoe)	1853 / 8 34°46'05.4"N 137°36'46.8"E	Totomi Province 34°46′5.4″N 137°36′46.8″E	
12	Suruga (駿河)	Miho Pine Grove (三保のまつ原, Miho no Matsubara)	1853 / 7	Suruga Province 34°59′43.6″N 138°31′29.1″E	
13	Kai (甲斐)	Monkey Bridge (さるはし, Saruhashi)	1853 / 8	Kai Province 35°36′56.68″N 138°58′48.8″E	
14	Izu (伊豆)	The Hot Springs of the Shuzen Temple (修禅寺 湯治場, Shuzenji tōji-ba)	1853 / 8	Izu Province 34°58′17.5″N 138°55′39.2″E	
15	Sagami (相模)	Enoshima, The Entrance to the Caves (江之嶋 岩屋ノ口, Kō no Shima iwaya nokuchi)	1853 / 8	Sagami Province 35°17′53″N 139°28′36.2″E	
16	Musashi (武蔵)	Sumida River, Snowy Morning (隅田川 雪の朝, Sumidagawa yukinoashita)	1853 / 8	Musashi Province 35°47′25.1″N 139°41′11.7″E	
17	Edo (江戸)	Asakusa Fair (浅草市, Asakusa-shi)	1853 / 10	Edo 35°42′50.6″N 139°47′48″E	
18	Awa (安房)	Kominato, Uchiura (小湊 内浦, Kominato Uchiura)	1853 / 8	Awa Province 35°07′47″N 140°11′33″E	
19	Kazusa (上総)	Yasashi Bay, Common name: Kujukuri (矢さしが浦 通名九十九里, Ya sashi ga Ura tōrina Kujūkuri)	1853 / 8	Kazusa Province 35°33′24.5″N 140°28′34.5″E	
20	Shimosa (下総)	Choshi Beach, Toura (Byōbugaura) (銚子の濱 外浦, Chōshi no hama Sotoura)	1853 / 8	Province 35°43′46.3″N 140°49′39″E	
21	Hitachi (常陸)	Daijingu Shrine in Kashima (鹿嶋大神宮, Kashima daijingū)	1853 / 8	Hitachi Province 35°59′46.1″N 140°36′7.1″E	
22	Omi (近江)	Lake Biwa, Ishiyama Temple (琵琶湖 石山寺, Biwako Ishiyamadera)	1853 / 7	Omi Province 34°57′38″N 135°54′20″E	
23	Mino (美濃)	Yoro Waterfall (養老ノ瀧, Yōrōnotaki)	1853 / 8	Mino Province 35°16′48″N 136°32′3″E	
24	Hida (飛弾)	Basket Ferry (籠わたし, Kagowatashi)	1853 / 8	Hida Province	
25	Shinano (信濃)	The Moon Reflected in the Sarashina Paddy-fields, Mount Kyodai (更科田毎月 鏡臺山, Sarashina tagoto no tsuki, Kyôdaisan)	1853 / 8	Shinano Province	
26	Kozuke (上野)	Mount Haruna Under Snow (榛名山 雪中, Harunasan setchū)	1853 / 8	Kozuke Province	
27	Shimotsuke (下野)	Mount Nikko, Urami Waterfall (日光山 裏見ノ瀧, Nikkōyama uraminotaki)	1853 / 8	Shimotsuke Province	
28	Mutsu (陸奥)	View of Matsushima, Sight Map from Mount Tomi (松島風景 富山眺望之略図, Matsushima fūkei Toyama chōbō no ryakuzu)	1853 / 8	Mutsu Province	
29	Dewa (出羽)	Mogami River, A Perspective View of Mount Gassan (最上川 月山遠望, Mogamigawa Gassan enbō)	1853 / 8	Dewa Province	
30	Wakasa (若狭)	A Fishing Boat Catching Flat Fish in a Net (漁船 鰈網, Gyosen karei-mō)	1853 / 9	Wakasa Province	
31	Echizen (越前)	Tsuruga, Kehi Pine Grove (敦賀 気比ノ松原, Tsuruga kihinomatsubara)	1853 / 9	Echizen Province	
32	Kaga (加賀)	The Eight Wonders of Kanazawa, The Fishing Fires on Lake Renko (金沢八勝之内 蓮湖之漁火, Kanazawa hasshô no uchi, Renko no isaribi)	1855 (Ansei 2), 9th month	Kaga Province	
33	Noto (能登)	Waterfall Bay (瀧之浦, Takiyuki Ura)	1853 / 9	Noto Province	
34	Etchu (越中)	Toyama, Pontoon (冨山 船橋, Tomiyama Funabashi)	1853 / 9	Etchu Province	
35	Echigo (越後)	Oyashirazu (親しらず)	1853 / 9	Echigo Province	
36	Sado (佐渡)	The Goldmines (金やま, Kin ya ma)	1853 / 9	Sado Province	
37	Tanba (丹波)	Kanegasaka (鐘坂)	1853 / 12	Tanba Province	
38	Tango (丹後)	Ama no hashidate (天の橋立)	1853 / 12	Tango Province	
39	Tajima (但馬)	Iwai Valley, Kannon Cave (岩井谷 窟観音, Iwaidani iwayakan'non)	1853 / 12	Tajima Province	
40	Inaba (因幡)	Karo, Koyama (加路 小山)	1853 / 12	Inaba Province	
41	Hoki (伯耆)	Ono, Distant View of Mount Daisen (大野 大山遠望, Ōno Ōyama enbō)	1853 / 12	Hoki Province	
42	Izumo (出雲)	Taisha, Depiction of Hotohoto (大社 ほとほとの図, Taisha hotohoto no zu)	1853 / 12	Izumo Province	
43	Iwami (石見)	Mount Takazuno, Salt Beach (高津山 汐濱, Kō Tsuyama Shiohama)	1853 / 12	Iwami Province	
44	Oki (隠岐)	Takuhi Shrine (焚火の社, Takibi no sha)	1853 / 12	Oki Province	
45	Harima (播磨)	Maiko Beach (舞子の濱, Maiko no hama)	1853 / 12	Harima Province	
46	Mimasaka (美作)	Yamabushi Valley (山伏谷, Yamabushidani)	1853 / 12	Mimasaka Province	
47	Bizen (備前)	Tanokuchi Coast, Yugasan torii (田の口海浜 瑜賀山鳥居)	1853 / 12	Bizen Province	
48	Bitchu (備中)	Gokei (豪渓)	1853 / 12	Bitchu Province	
49	Bingo (備後)	Abuto, Kannon Temple (阿武門観音堂, Abu-mon Kan'nondō)	1853 / 12	Bingo Province	
50	Aki (安藝)	Itsukushima, Depiction of a Festival (巌島 祭礼之図, Iwao-jima sairei no zu)	1853 / 12	Aki Province	
51	Suo (周防)	Iwakuni, Kintai Bridge (岩國 錦帯橋, Iwakuni Kintaikyō)	1856 / 12	Suo Province	
52	Nagato (長門)	Shimonoseki (下の関)	1856 / 3	Nagato Province	
53	Kii (紀伊)	Waka no ura (和哥之浦)	1855 / 9	Kii Province	
54	Awaji (淡路)	Goshiki Beach (五色濱, Goshiki hama)	1855 / 9	Awaji Province	
55	Awa (阿波)	Naruto Whirlpools (鳴門の風波, Naruto no fūha)	1855 / 9	Awa Province	
56	Sanuki (讃岐)	Distant View of Mount Zozu (象頭山遠望, Zōzusan enbō)	1855 / 9	Sanuki Province	
57	Iyo (伊豫)	Saijo (西條)	1855 / 9	Iyo Province	
58	Tosa (土佐)	Bonito Fishing at Sea (海上松魚釣, Umi Agematsu Uotsuri)	1855 / 9	Tosa Province	
59	Chikuzen (筑前)	Hakozaki, Umi no Nakamichi (筥崎 海中道みち)	1855 / 9	Chikuzen Province	
60	Chikugo (筑後)	The Currents Around the Weir (簗瀬, Yanaze)	1855 / 9	Chikugo Province	
61	Buzen (豊前)	The Passage Under the Rakan Monastery (羅漢寺 下道, Rakanji Shitamichi)	1854 / 11	Buzen Province	
62	Bungo (豊後)	Minosaki (簑崎)	1856 / 4	Bungo Province	
63	Hizen (肥前)	Nagasaki, Mount Inasa (長嵜 稲佐山)	1856 / 5	Hizen Province	
64	Higo (肥後)	Gokanosho (五ヶの庄)	1856 / 3	Higo Province	
65	Hyuga (日向)	Aburatsu Port, Obi Oshima (油津ノ湊 飫肥大嶌, Aburatsu no minato, Obi Ôshima)	1856 / 3	Hyuga Province	
66	Osumi (大隅)	Sakurajima (桜島)	1856 / 3	Osumi Province	
67	Satsuma (薩摩)	Bo Bay, The Two-sword Rocks (坊ノ浦 雙剣石, Bô no ura, Sôkenseki)	1856 / 3	Satsuma Province	
68	Iki (壱岐)	Shisa (志作)	1856 / 3	Iki Province	
69	Tsushima (対馬)	A Fine Evening on the Coast, Tsushima Province (海岸 夕晴)	1856 / 3	Tsushima Province 34°25′0″N 129°20′0″E	
—	Table of Contents	—	—	—	
