= Iwakuni Castle =

Replica castle in Yamaguchi, Japan

Coordinates: 34°10′30.92″N 132°10′27.23″E

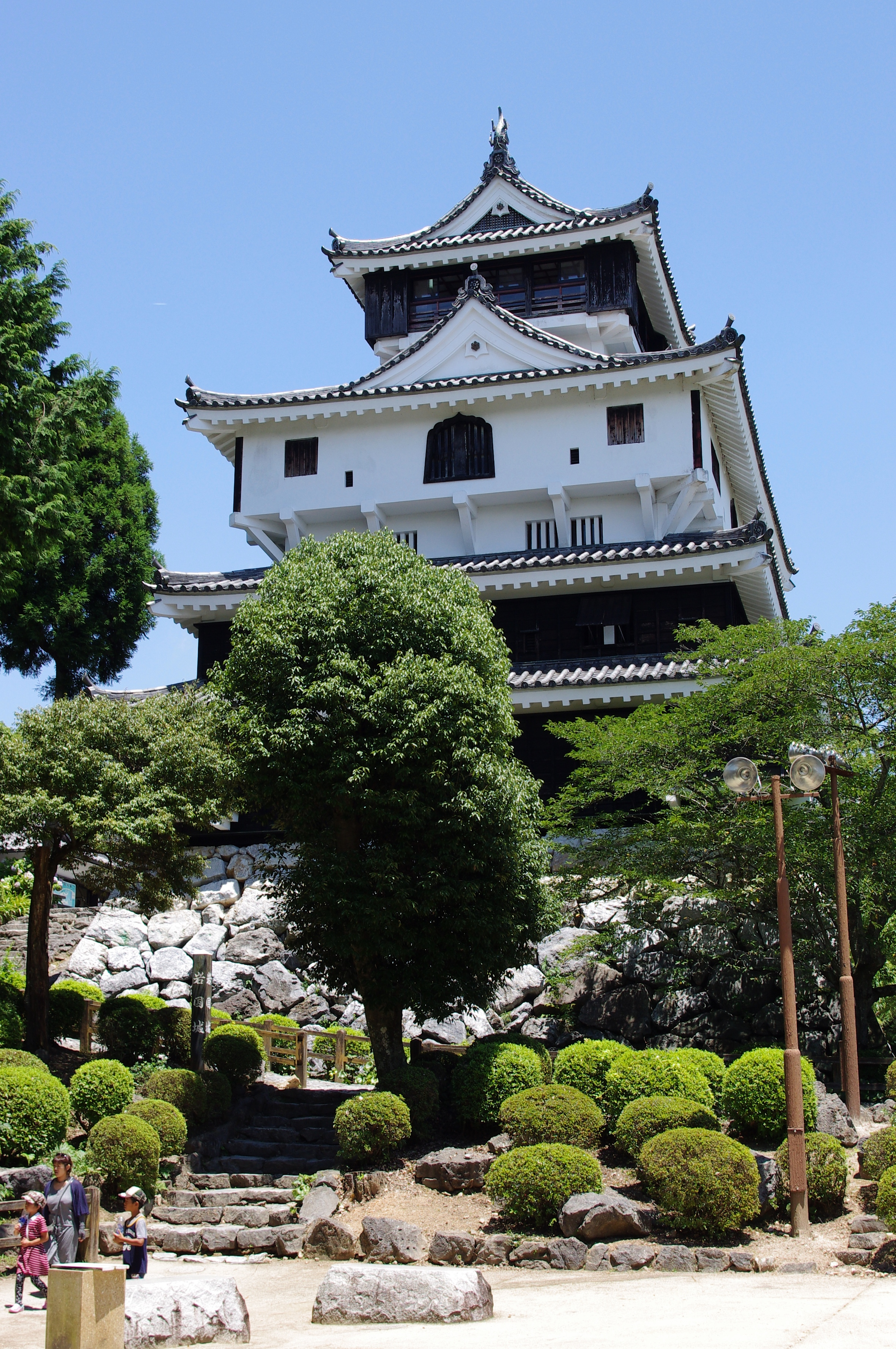
Tenshu

Iwakuni Castle (岩国城, Iwakunijō) is a replica castle in Iwakuni, Yamaguchi, Japan. The nearby Kintai Bridge was originally a footbridge over the Nishiki River to the main gate of the castle.

== History ==
This castle was originally constructed by Kikkawa Hiroie from 1601 to 1608 as his own castle. Kikkawa was a retainer of a vassal of the Shōgun under the Mōri clan. However, this castle was dismantled as per the Ikkoku-ichijo (一国一城, literally, "One Castle Per Province") order established by the Tokugawa Shogunate in 1615.

After the destruction of the castle, Kikkawa used a part of the old castle as his residential office. The Kikkawa clan held this castle and Iwakuni Han, which was assessed at 30,000 (later 60,000) koku.

A replica of the castle tower built in 1962 now stands high on a hill above the Nishiki River and the Kintai Bridge. The castle was selected to be one of the 100 Great Castles of Japan by the Japan Castle Foundation in 2006.
