= Kusaka Genzui =

Japanese samurai

- 久坂 玄瑞
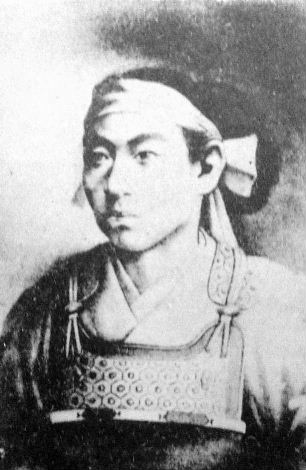
- Born: Kusaka Hidezaburō; May 1840; Hagi, Nagato Province, Japan
- Died: August 20, 1864 (aged 24); Kyoto, Japan
- Burial place: Kyoto Ryozen Gokoku Shrine, Kyoto, Japan
- Spouse: Sugi Fumi (m. 1857–1864)
- Relatives: Kusaka Ryōteki (father); Tomiko (mother); Kusaka Genki (brother)
- Military career
- Allegiance: Chōshū Domain
- Conflicts: Battle of Shimonoseki Straits; Shimonoseki Campaign; Kinmon incident

Kusaka Genzui (久坂 玄瑞), (born Kusaka Hidezaburō; May 1840 – 20 August 1864) was a samurai of the Japanese domain of Chōshū who was active during the Bakumatsu period and a key proponent of the sonnō jōi movement.

== Early life ==
He was born Kusaka Hidezaburō in 1840 in Hagi, a town in Nagato Province in Chōshū Domain. He was the third son of the physician Kusaka Ryōteki and Tomiko; their eldest son was named Genki, and their second died while still young. The family belonged to a 7th-rank samurai family, but received a stipend of only 25 koku of rice.

From a young age Kusaka learned the Four Books by rote at a private juku that Takasugi Shinsaku also attended. He then attended the domain's Kōseikan medical school. At fourteen his mother died, and the following year so did his brother Genki and then mere days later his father as well. As the sole surviving member of his family Genzui became the head of the family and the family's medical practice; he thus shaved his head and took the name Genzui. At 17 his academic achievements won Genzui a dormitory placement at the Kōseikan at the domain's expense.

== Physical characteristics ==
Kusaka stood 6 shaku (182 cm) tall and had a well-built frame. He was slightly wall-eyed in one eye. He was noted for the quality of his loud voice.

== Tutelage under Yoshida Shōin ==
In 1856 Nakamura Michitarō recommended Kusaka to study in Kyushu. He travelled around Kyushu visiting sights and well-known literary figures, and wrote poetry that later appeared in a collected volume. While visiting Kumamoto, the samurai Miyabe Teizō strongly encouraged Kusaka to study under Yoshida Shōin, as had a friend of his brother's for some time. Upon returning to Hagi he wrote Shōin, and with the help of a friend of Shōin's, Tsuchiya Shōkai, applied to study with the master.

In his letter to Shōin, Kusaka commented: "As at the time of the Battle of Kōan the foreign envoys should be cut down, in which case the Americans will surely attack. When they do it will probably provide the chance to arouse the loose discipline of the samurai into a vigorous national defence." (Note: 「弘安の役の時の如く外国の使者を斬るべし。そうすれば、必ず米国は来襲する。来襲すれば、綱紀の緩んだ武士達も覚醒し、期せずして国防も厳重になるであろう」) Shōin returned the letter with a note of condemnation in the margin reading: "Your argument is frivolous and its judgement shallow; it does not come from sincerity. I hate that sort of writing and that sort of person. It is already too late to cut down the American envoys. To employ dead old ways to solve problems in a completely changed modern world demonstrates shallow judgement. You would be better off building your sincerity than wasting time with such tedious speciousness. Remarks not put into practice serve no purpose." (Note: 「あなたの議論は浮ついており、思慮も浅い。至誠より発する言葉ではない。私はこの種の文章を憎みこの種の人間を憎む。アメリカの使節を斬るのは今はもう遅い。昔の死んだような事例をもとに、現在のまったく違った出来事を解決しようということを思慮が浅いと言うのだ。つまらぬ迷言を費すよりも、至誠を積み蓄えるべきだ。実践を抜きにした言説は駄目だ」)

== Death ==
In 20 August 1864 during the Kinmon incident outside the Kyoto Imperial Palace, he was wounded by a rifle fire, and committed suicide to avoid capture by ritual seppuku.

== Works cited ==
- Furukawa, Kaoru (1979). Kakan no shishi: Kusaka Genzui den 花冠の志士 : 久坂玄瑞伝. Bungeishunjū. OCLC 23327076.
- Huber, Thomas M. (1990). The Revolutionary Origins of Modern Japan. Stanford University Press. ISBN 978-0-8047-1755-7.
- Takeda, Kanji (1944). Kusaka Genzui 久坂玄瑞 (in Japanese). Dōtōsha. OCLC 33654618.
- Tateishi, Yū (2015). Kusaka Genzui: Takasugi Shinsaku to narabi shōsareta shōkasonjuku no shun'ei 久坂玄瑞 : 高杉晋作と並び称された松下村塾の俊英 (in Japanese). PHP Kenkyūjo. ISBN 9784569762630.
