= Chōshū Domain =

Administrative division in Japan (1600–1871)

Yamaguchi Domain (1869–1871) 山口藩 Chōshū Domain (1600–1869) 長州藩
- Domain of Japan
- 1600–1871
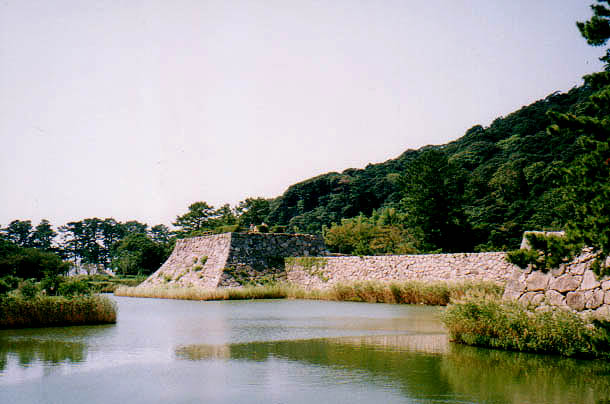
- Former site of Hagi Castle in Hagi

- Flag (Note: Flag used by the Chōshū army during the Boshin War from 1868 to 1869.) Mon of the Mōri
- Capital: Hagi Castle (1600–1862); Yamaguchi Castle (1862–1871)
- Government
- Daimyō
  - 1563–1623: Mōri Terumoto (first)
  - 1858–1871: Mōri Motonori (last)
- Historical era: Edo period
  - Established: 1600
  - Abolition of the han system: 1871
- Contained within
  - Province: Nagato
- Today part of: Yamaguchi Prefecture

Map of Japanese provinces (1868) with Nagato Province highlighted

The Chōshū Domain (長州藩, Chōshū-han), also known as the Hagi Domain (萩藩, Hagi-han), was a domain (han) of the Tokugawa Shogunate of Japan during the Edo period from 1600 to 1871.

The Chōshū Domain was based at Hagi Castle in Nagato Province, in the modern city of Hagi, located in the Chūgoku region of the island of Honshu. The Chōshū Domain was ruled for its existence by the tozama daimyō of the Mōri, whose branches also ruled the neighboring Chōfu and Kiyosue domains and was assessed under the Kokudaka system with peak value of 369,000 koku. The Chōshū Domain was the most prominent anti-Tokugawa domain and it formed the Satchō Alliance with the rival Satsuma Domain during the Meiji Restoration, becoming instrumental in the establishment of the Empire of Japan and the Meiji oligarchy. The Chōshū Domain was dissolved in the abolition of the han system in 1871 by the Meiji government and its territory was absorbed into Yamaguchi Prefecture.

== History ==
The rulers of Chōshū were the descendants of the great Sengoku warlord Mōri Motonari. Motonari was able to extend his power over all of the Chūgoku region of Japan and occupied a territory worth 1,200,000 koku. After he died, his grandson and heir Mōri Terumoto became daimyō and implemented a strategy of alliance with Toyotomi Hideyoshi. This would later prove to be a great mistake. After Hideyoshi's death, the daimyō Tokugawa Ieyasu challenged the Toyotomi power and battled with Hideyoshi's trusted advisor Ishida Mitsunari at the Battle of Sekigahara. Mōri Terumoto was the most powerful ally of the Toyotomi and was elected by a council of Toyotomi loyalists to be the titulary head of the Toyotomi force. However, the Toyotomi forces lost the battle due to several factors tied to Mōri Terumoto:

- His cousin Kikkawa Hiroie secretly made a deal with Tokugawa Ieyasu resulting in the inactivity of 15,000 Mōri soldiers during the battle.
- His adopted cousin Kobayakawa Hideaki and his 15,600 soldiers betrayed Ishida and joined the Tokugawa side.
- After assurances from Tokugawa Ieyasu, Terumoto gave up the formidable Osaka castle without a fight.

Despite its inactivity, the Mōri clan was removed from its ancestral home in Aki to Nagato Province (also known as Chōshū), and its holdings were drastically reduced from 1,200,000 to 369,000 koku.

This was seen as a great act of betrayal of the Mōri clan, and Chōshū later became a hotbed of anti-Tokugawa activities. The origins of this were evident in the tradition of the clan's New Year's meeting. Every year during the meeting, the elders and the administrators would ask the daimyo whether the time to overthrow the shogunate had come, to which the daimyo would reply: "Not yet; the shogunate is still too powerful."

This dream would eventually be realized some 260 years later, when the domain joined forces with the Satsuma Domain and sympathetic court nobles to overthrow the Tokugawa shogunate. In 1865, the domain bought a warship Union (ja) from Glover and Co., an agency of Jardine Matheson established in Nagasaki, in the name of Satsuma Domain. They led the fight against the armies of the former shōgun, which included the Ōuetsu Reppan Dōmei, Aizu, and the Ezo Republic, during the Boshin War. The domains' military forces of 1867 through 1869 also formed the foundation for the Imperial Japanese Army. Thanks to this alliance, Chōshū and Satsuma natives enjoyed political and societal prominence well into the Meiji and even Taishō eras.

== Economics ==
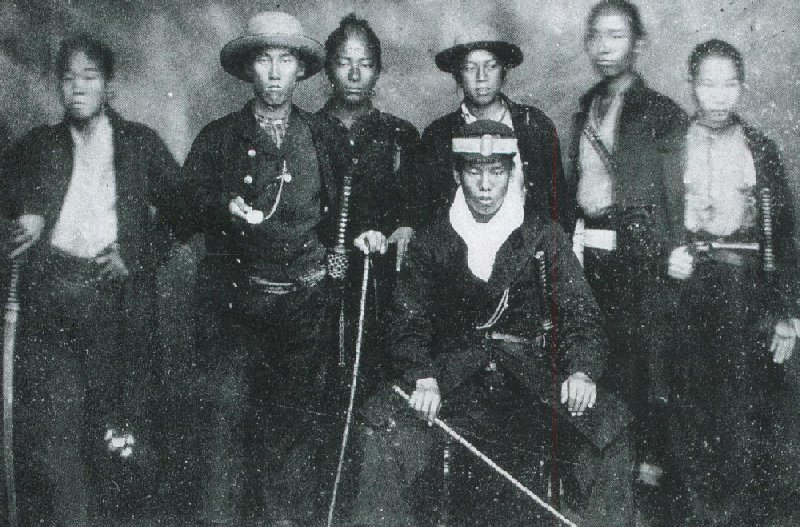
The Chōshū Kiheitai fought against the shogunate in the Second Chōshū expedition and the Boshin War.

The initial reduction of 1.2 million to 369,000 koku resulted in a large shortfall in terms of military upkeep and infrastructure maintenance, despite which the domain remained the seventh largest in Japan outside the shogunate-controlled domains. In order to bring the domain's finances out of debt, strict policies were enforced on the retainers:

- All retainers' fiefs were drastically reduced.
- Some retainers who were paid in land began to be paid in rice.
- Some retainers were laid off and encouraged to engage in agriculture.

Previously, as a result of high taxation, farmers secretly developed farms far inside the mountains as a private food source. A new land survey was conducted within the domain in which many hidden farms were discovered and taxed. The domain also began a strict policy with regard to trade.

Laws were also passed through which the profitable trade of the "four whites" was controlled by the domain: paper, rice, salt, and wax. Some of the profits, and a large amount of the tax revenue from this trade, went into the domain coffers.

These policies greatly strengthened the domain's finances and allowed the daimyo more effective control over his territory. However, these policies angered peasants and displaced samurai alike, resulting in frequent revolts.

== Politics ==
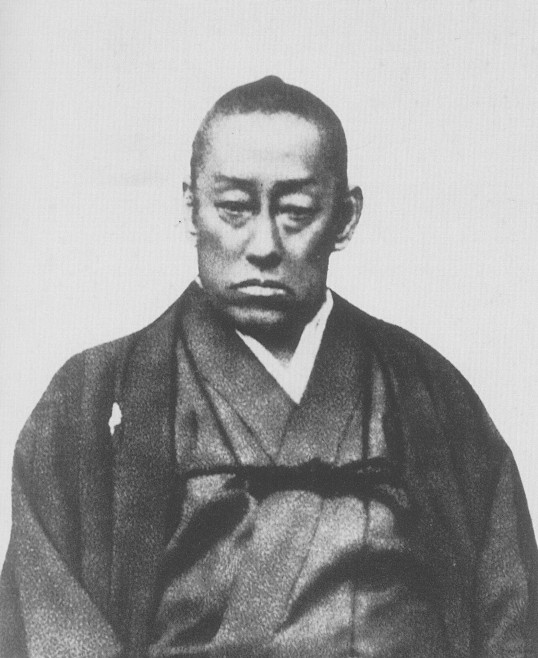
Mōri Takachika

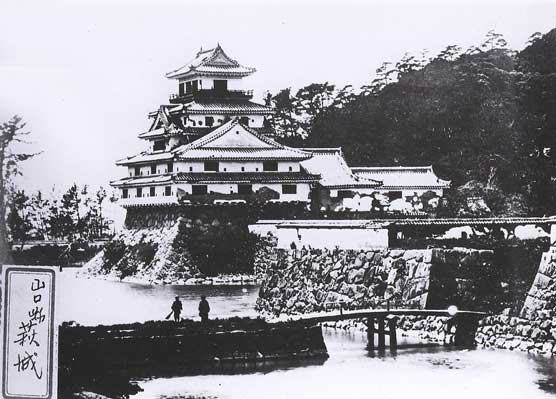
Hagi Castle, the seat of the Mōri Lords of Chōshū

The capital of the domain was the castle town of Hagi, which was the source of Chōshū's alternate name of Hagi han (萩藩).

The domain remained under the rule of the Mōri family for the duration of the Edo period. Because the shogunate frequently confiscated domains whose daimyo were unable to produce heirs, the Mōri daimyo created four subordinate han ruled by branches of the family:

- Iwakuni han: 60,000 koku, ruled by descendants of Kikkawa Hiroie.
- Chōfū han: 50,000 koku, ruled by descendants of Mōri Hidemoto.
- Tokuyama han: 40,000 koku, ruled by descendants of Mōri Naritaka.
- Kiyosue han: 10,000 koku, ruled by descendants of Mōri Mototomo.

During the Edo period, the main branch died out in 1707, after which heirs were adopted from the Chōfu branch, which also became extinct in 1751. The family then continued through the Kiyosue branch.

The Mōri daimyo, as with many of his counterparts throughout Japan, was assisted in the government of his domain by a group of karō, or domain elders. There were two kinds of karō in Chōshū: hereditary karō (whose families retained the rank in perpetuity) and the "lifetime karō", whose rank was granted to an individual but could not be inherited by his son.

The hereditary karō were either members of minor branches of the Mōri family, or members of related families such as the Shishido and the Fukuhara, or descendants of Mōri Motonari's most trusted generals and advisors such as the Mazuda, the Kuchiba and the Kunishi.

The lifetime karō were middle or lower samurai who displayed great talent in economics or politics and were promoted to karō by the daimyō. One such person was the great reformer Murata Seifu.

== List of daimyōs ==
- Mōri clan (Tozama, 369,000 koku), 1600–1871

Daimyōs of Chōshū Domain
| | Name | Tenure |
|---|---|---|
| 0 | Mōri Terumoto (毛利輝元) | 1563–1623 |
| 1 | Mōri Hidenari (毛利秀就) | 1623–1651 |
| 2 | Mōri Tsunahiro (毛利綱広) | 1651–1682 |
| 3 | Mōri Yoshinari (毛利吉就) | 1682–1694 |
| 4 | Mōri Yoshihiro (毛利吉広) | 1694–1707 |
| 5 | Mōri Yoshimoto (毛利吉元) | 1707–1731 |
| 6 | Mōri Munehiro (毛利宗広) | 1731–1751 |
| 7 | Mōri Shigetaka (毛利重就) | 1751–1782 |
| 8 | Mōri Haruchika (毛利治親) | 1782–1791 |
| 9 | Mōri Narifusa (毛利斉房) | 1791–1809 |
| 10 | Mōri Narihiro (毛利斉熙) | 1809–1824 |
| 11 | Mōri Narimoto (毛利斉元) | 1824–1836 |
| 12 | Mōri Naritō (毛利斉広) | 1836 |
| 13 | Mōri Takachika (毛利敬親) | 1836–1869 |
| 14 | Mōri Motonori (毛利元徳) | 1869–1871 |

== Simplified family tree of the main Mōri line (Lords of Chōshū) ==
- Mōri Motonari (1497–1571)
  - Takamoto (1523–1563)
    - I. Terumoto, 1st Lord of Chōshū (cr. 1600) (1553–1625; r. 1600–1623)
      - II. Hidenari, 2nd Lord of Chōshū (1595–1651; r. 1623–1651)
        - III. Tsunahiro, 3rd Lord of Chōshū (1639–1689; r. 1651–1682)
          - IV. Yoshinari, 4th Lord of Chōshū (1668–1694; r. 1682–1694).
          - V. Yoshihiro, 5th Lord of Chōshū (1673–1707; r. 1694–1707)
      - Naritaka, 1st Lord of Tokuyama (1602–1679)
        - Mototsugu, 3rd Lord of Tokuyama (1667–1719)
          - Hirotoyo, 5th Lord of Tokuyama (1705–1773)
            - Nariyoshi, 7th Lord of Tokuyama (1750–1828)
              - Hiroshige, 8th Lord of Tokuyama (1777–1866)
                - XV. Motonori, 15th Lord of Chōshū, 1st Prince (1839–1896; r. 1869, Governor of Hagi 1869–1871, family head 1871–1896, created 1st Prince 1884)
                  - Motoaki, 29th family head, 2nd Prince (1865–1938; 29th family head and 2nd Prince 1896–1938)
                    - Motomichi, 30th family head, 3rd Prince (1903–1976; 30th family head 1938–1976, 3rd Prince to 1947)
                      - Motoyoshi, 31st family head (1930– ; 31st family head 1976–)
                        - Motoei (born 1967)
  - Motokiyo (1551–1597)
    - Hidemoto, 1st Lord of Chōfū (1579–1650)
      - Mitsuhiro, 2nd Lord of Chōfū (1616–1653)
        - Tsunamoto, 3rd Lord of Chōfū (1650–1709)
          - VI. Yoshimoto, 6th Lord of Chōshū (1677–1731; r. 1707–1731)
            - VII. Munehiro, 7th Lord of Chōshū (1715–1751; r. 1731–1751)
      - Mototomo, 1st Lord of Kiyosue (1631–1683)
        - Masahiro, 6th Lord of Chōfū, 2nd Lord of Kiyosue (1675–1729)
          - VIII. Shigetaka, 8th Lord of Chōshū (1725–1789; r. 1751–1782)
            - IX. Haruchika, 9th Lord of Chōshū (1754–1791; r. 1782–1791)
              - X. Narifusa, 10th Lord of Chōshū (1779–1809; r. 1791–1809)
              - XI. Narihiro, 11th Lord of Chōshū (1784–1836; r. 1809–1824)
                - XIII. Naritō, 13th Lord of Chōshū (1815–1836; r. 1836).
            - Chikaaki (1766–1800)
              - XII. Narimoto, 12th Lord of Chōshū (1794–1836; r. 1824–1836)
                - XIV. Takachika, 14th Lord of Chōshū (1819–1871; r. 1836–1869)

== Famous people ==
Middle Edo period

- Murata Seifū (1783–1855), conducted the Tempō reforms in Chōshū

Bakumatsu period

- Kido Takayoshi (Kido Kōin) (1833–1877), Bakumatsu reformer, one of Three Great Nobles of the Restoration
- Kijima Matabei (1817–1864), swordsman, took part in the Kinmon Incident
- Kunishi Shinano (1842–1864), committed seppuku to take responsibility for the Kinmon Incident
- Takasugi Shinsaku (1839–1867), significant contributor to Meiji Restoration, founder of the Kiheitai
- Yoshida Shōin (1830–1859), educator and teacher of many reformers

Meiji statesmen

- Chōshū Five
  - Endō Kinsuke (1836–1893), Meiji statesman
  - Inoue Monta, later Inoue Kaoru (1836–1915), Meiji statesman
  - Itō Shunsuke, later Itō Hirobumi (1841–1909), first Prime Minister of Japan
  - Nomura Yakichi, later Inoue Masaru (1843–1910), "father of the Japanese railways"
  - Yamao Yōzō (1837–1917), later studied engineering at the Andersonian Institute, Glasgow, 1866–68, Meiji statesman
- Aoki Shūzō (1844–1914), diplomat and Foreign Minister in Meiji Japan
- Katsura Tarō (1848–1913), general in the Imperial Japanese Army and three-time prime minister of Japan
- Shinagawa Yajirō (1843–1900), Home Minister in early Meiji Japan
- Sone Arasuke (1849–1910), politician, diplomat, cabinet minister, and second Japanese Resident-General of Korea.
- Terauchi Masatake (1852–1919), Field Marshal in the Imperial Japanese Army and 18th prime minister of Japan
- Tanaka Giichi (1864–1929), general in the Imperial Japanese Army and 26th prime minister of Japan
- Yamagata Aritomo (1838–1922), prime minister and field marshal of the Imperial Japanese Army
- Yamagata Isaburō (1858–1927), nephew of Yamagata Aritomo, Minister of Communications, and first Japanese Inspector-General of Korea.

Imperial Japanese Army personnel

- Arisaka Nariakira (1852–1915), lieutenant general in the Imperial Japanese Army, inventor of the Arisaka Rifle
- Hasegawa Yoshimichi (1850–1924), Imperial Japanese Army field marshal and Governor General of Korea
- Kodama Gentarō (1852–1906), general in the Imperial Japanese Army and government minister in Meiji Japan
- Miura Gorō (1847–1926), lieutenant general in the Imperial Japanese Army
- Nogi Maresuke (1849–1912), general in the Imperial Japanese Army, and a prominent figure in the Russo-Japanese War
- Oka Ichinosuke (1860–1916), general in the Imperial Japanese Army and Minister of War during World War I
- Ōmura Masujirō (1824–1869), "Father of the modern Japanese Army"
- Ōshima Yoshimasa (1850–1926), general in the Imperial Japanese Army during the First Sino-Japanese War
- Sakuma Samata (1844–1915), general in the Imperial Japanese Army, and 5th Governor-General of Taiwan (1906–1915)

Imperial Japanese Navy personnel

- Arichi Shinanojō (1843–1919), admiral in the Imperial Japanese Navy, Chief of the Imperial Japanese Navy General Staff
- Nashiba Tokioki (1850–1924), admiral in the Imperial Japanese Navy
- Tsuboi Kōzō (1843–1898), admiral of the Imperial Japanese Navy

Post Meiji Restoration descendants of Chōshū families

- Shinzo Abe (1954–2022), Nobusuke Kishi (1897–1987), and Eisaku Satō (1901–1975), post-war Prime Ministers and descendants of Chōshū magistrate Satō Nobuhiro. They form the nucleus of the modern Satō-Kishi-Abe political dynasty
- Aikawa Yoshisuke (1880–1967) Japanese entrepreneur, businessman, politician, and founder of the Nissan zaibatsu, grand nephew of Inoue Kaoru
- Inoue Koichi (penname: Inoue Kenkabō) (1870–1934), journalist and writer of senryū (short, humorous verse)
- Inoue Mitsusada (1917–1983), Historian of Ancient Japan, University of Tokyo Professor, first director of National Museum of Japanese History, Grandson of Inoue Kaoru and Katsura Taro
- Matsuoka Yōsuke (1880–1946), diplomat, Foreign Minister, architect of the WWII era Tripartite Pact

== See also ==
- First Chōshū expedition
- Satchō Alliance
- Second Chōshū expedition
- Boshin War
- List of Han
