= Kikkawa Hiroie =

Japanese daimyō (1561–1625)

- 吉川 広家
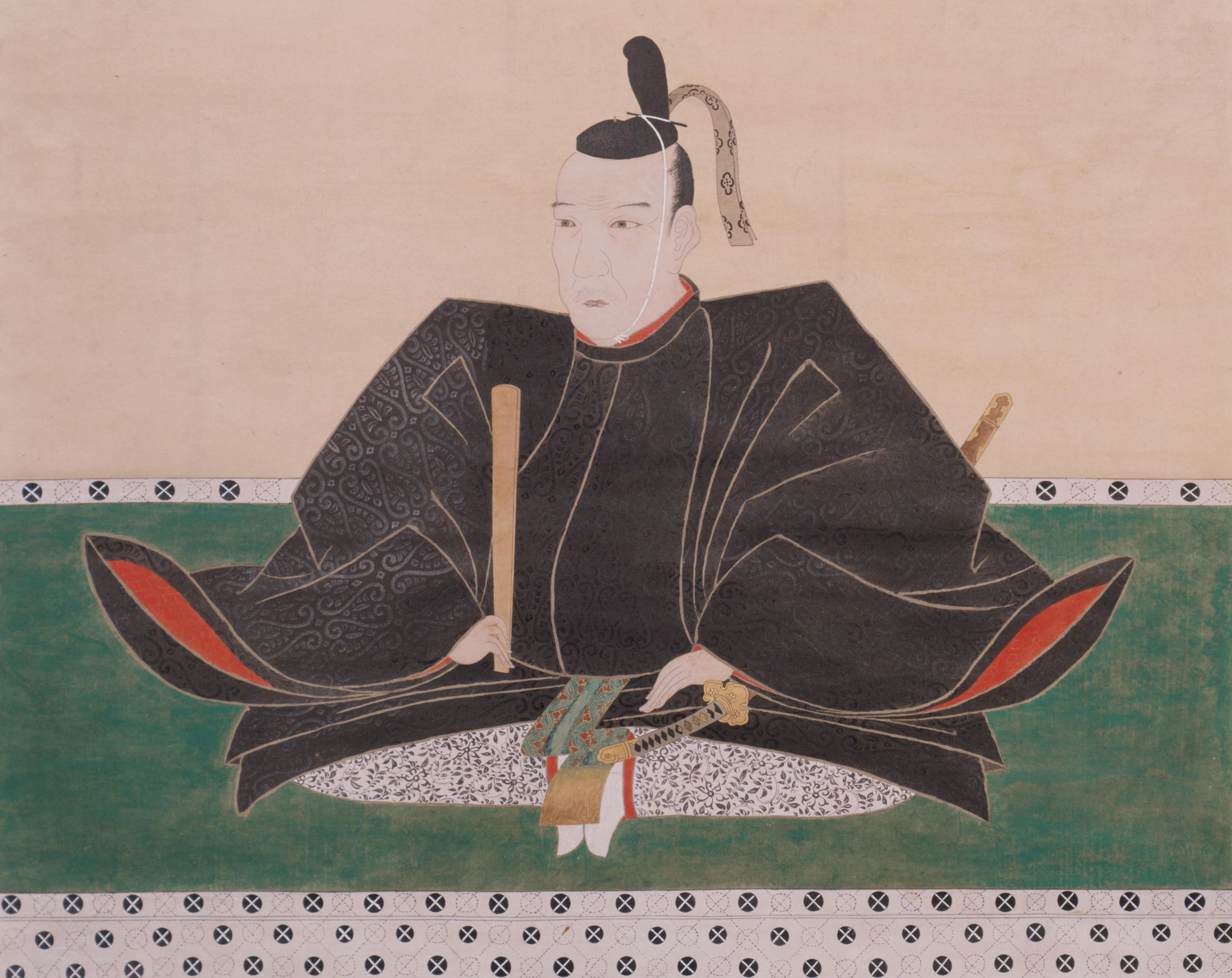

Lord of Iwakuni
- In office 1601–1615
- Succeeded by: Kikkawa Hiromasa

Head of Kikkawa clan
- In office 1587–1614
- Preceded by: Kikkawa Motoharu
- Succeeded by: Kikkawa Hiromasa

Personal details
- Born: Tsunenobu (経信); December 7, 1561
- Died: October 22, 1625 (aged 63)
- Children: Kikkawa Hiromasa
- Parent: Kikkawa Motoharu (father)

Military service
- Allegiance: Mōri clan Toyotomi clan Western Army; Tokugawa shogunate
- Unit: Kikkawa clan
- Commands: Iwakuni Domain
- Battles/wars: Siege of Kōzuki Castle (1578); Korean Campaign (1592-1598); Battle of Sekigahara (1600)

Kikkawa Hiroie (吉川 広家) (December 7, 1561 – October 22, 1625) was a Japanese daimyō of the Azuchi–Momoyama period through early Edo period. Hiroie's father was Kikkawa Motoharu and his mother was a daughter of Kumagai Nobunao.

== Biography ==
He initially was named Tsunenobu (経信) and made his debut on the battlefield on 1578 against Amago Katsuhisa with his father. On 1583, he was sent to then the de facto ruler Hashiba Hideyoshi as a hostage.

From 1586 to 1587, his father and his elder brother Kikkawa Motonaga both died and he became the head of Kikkawa clan. Around this time, he changed his name to Hiroie. Unlike his father and his elder brother who was known for the battlefield bravery, Hiroie preferred strategy and diplomacy to win on a battlefield and was highly praised by Hideyoshi for holding the Mōri clan together after the death of Kobayakawa Takakage.

During the Seven-Year Korean War, he is noted for the defeat of a much larger "Ming army" at the siege of Ulsan castle.

== Battle Of Sekigahara ==
In the Battle of Sekigahara on 1600, Hiroie judged that the Tokugawa side would win. However, as one of the five leading elders of the Toyotomi government, Mōri Terumoto and several of the Mōri clan's retainers was supportive of the pro-Toyotomi forces led by Ishida Mitsunari. In order to ensure the survival of the clan, Hiroie made a secret pact with the Tokugawa side through Kuroda Nagamasa, promising to Mōri neutrality during the battle in exchange for guarantees of the existing Mōri domains.

Although Mōri Terumoto was made the nominal commander-in-chief of the western army, he remained in the Osaka Castle. Instead, the Mōri field army joined the rest of the western forces under the command of Mōri Hidemoto, with Hiroie commanding the vanguards. On the day of the actual battle, September 15, the Mōri army deployed on the flank of the Tokugawa forces. However, when Hidemoto ordered an assault, Hiroie refused to comply and used the vanguards under his command to block off the attack routes. Hiroie was thus able to prevent the bulk of the Mōri army from engaging the Tokugawa troops.

The bulk of the Mōri army therefore never actually took part in the battle. However, after Tokugawa Ieyasu emerged victorious, several documents incriminating Mōri Terumoto were found in the Osaka Castle. Ieyasu believed the documents showed that Terumoto was involved more deeply in the western army than Hiroie had presented, and thus voided their secret pact. Initially he wished to completely confiscate all Mōri domains and give two provinces to Hiroie as a reward.

However the offer shocked Hiroie, whose motivation was to ensure the Mōri clan's survival. Eventually Ieyasu relented, and instead reduced the Mōri clan's domains to just two provinces under the condition that Mōri Terumoto retired. Although Hiroie succeeded in keeping the Mōri clan's daimyō status, the Mōri clan lost over 3 quarters of its former territories.

Because Hiroie had proceeded with the secret negotiations without the clan's approval or knowledge, once the events came to light he came under intense attacks from his own clan. Many considered him a traitor, especially since it was felt that his actions during the battle was instrumental in the Tokugawa victory that led to the disastrous punishment. Hidemoto in particular would become his bitter rival in Mōri clan politics.

After the battle, Terumoto gave a portion of his much reduced domain to Hiroie. He is therefore often mistakenly considered the first ruler of an Iwakuni han; however, unlike the Mōri shihans that were established for branches of the Mōri clan in the same period, Hiroie and his descendants were not made daimyōs in their own right until the Meiji Restoration. Instead, the Kikkawa family continued to be senior retainers of the Mōri clan until the end of the Bakufu, at which point the Iwakuni domain officially became a han.

== Death ==
In 1614, Hiroie was succeeded by Kikkawa Hiromasa, his eldest son.

Hiroie died on October 22, 1625, twelve years after passing the clan leadership to his heir.

Hiroie worked for prosperity of his domain; he is remembered for having laid down a set of laws with 188 clauses (the Kikkawa-shi hatto).

Preceded by none	Daimyō of Iwakuni; 1601–1615	Succeeded by Kikkawa Hiromasa
Preceded by Kikkawa Motonaga	Kikkawa family head 1587–1614	Succeeded by Kikkawa Hiromasa
