= Yamada Akiyoshi =

Japanese politician

Count Yamada Akiyoshi
- 山田 顕義
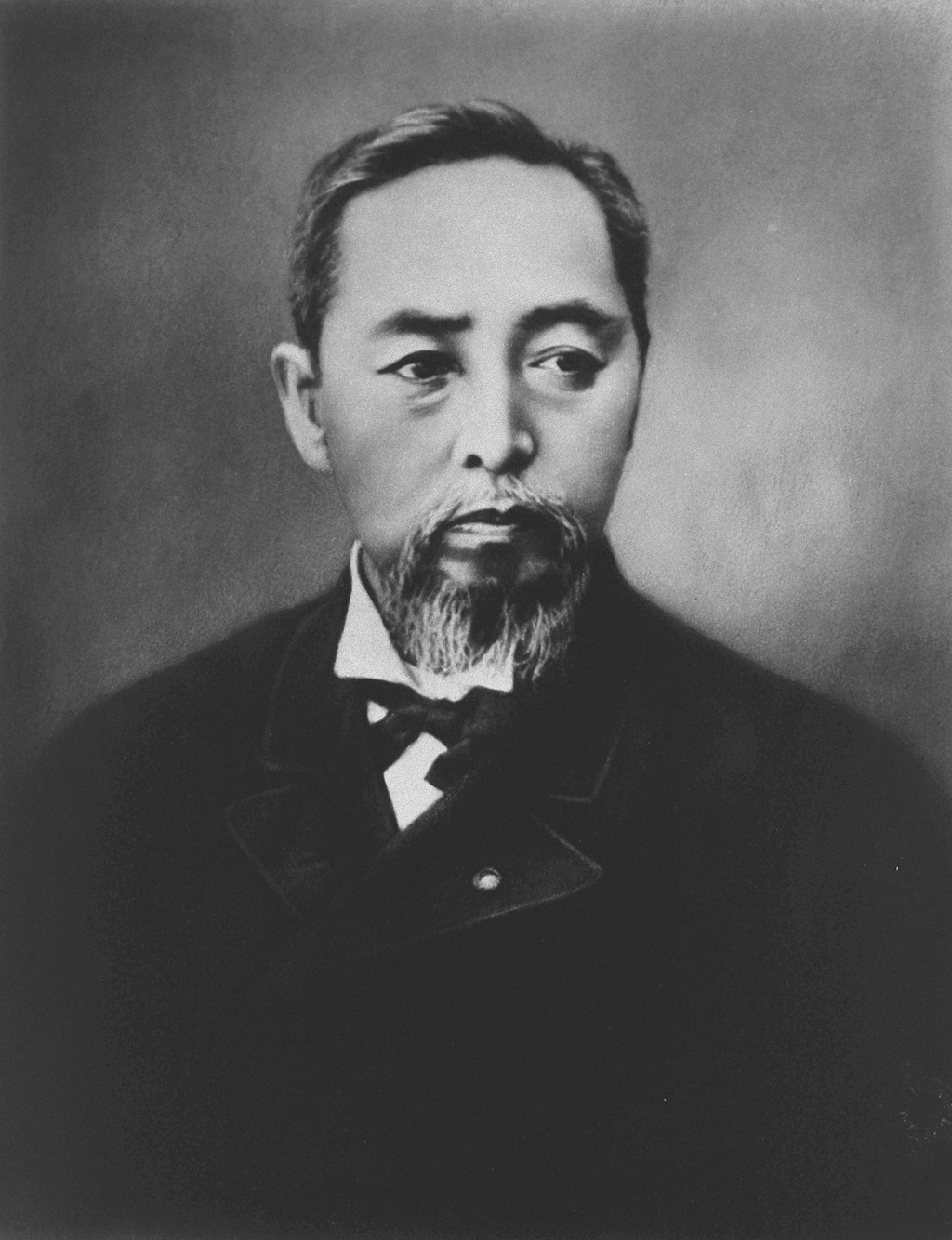

Minister of Justice
- In office December 22, 1885 – June 1, 1891
- Prime Minister: Itō Hirobumi; Kuroda Kiyotaka; Yamagata Aritomo; Matsukata Masayoshi
- Preceded by: Himself (as Lord of Justice)
- Succeeded by: Tanaka Fujimaro

Lord of Justice
- In office December 12, 1883 – December 25, 1885
- Monarch: Meiji
- Preceded by: Ōki Takatō
- Succeeded by: Himself (as Minister of Justice)

Lord of Home Affairs
- In office October 21, 1881 – December 12, 1883
- Monarch: Meiji
- Preceded by: Matsukata Masayoshi
- Succeeded by: Yamagata Aritomo

Lord of Public Works
- In office September 10, 1879 – February 28, 1880
- Monarch: Meiji
- Preceded by: Inoue Kaoru
- Succeeded by: Yamao Yōzō

Member of the House of Peers
- In office July 10, 1890 – April 1, 1892 Elected by the Barons

Member of the Genrōin
- In office March 5, 1878 – September 10, 1879

Personal details
- Born: November 18, 1844 Hagi, Nagato, Japan
- Died: November 11, 1892 (aged 47) Asago, Hyōgo, Japan
- Resting place: Gokoku-ji, Tokyo, Japan
- Citizenship: Japanese

Military service
- Branch/service: Imperial Japanese Army
- Rank: Lieutenant General
- Battles/wars: Shimonoseki Campaign; Coup of August 18, 1863; Kinmon incident; Kozan-ji uprising; Second Chōshū expedition; Boshin War; Battle of Toba-Fushimi; Battle of Hokuetsu; Battle of Hatchōoki; Battle of Hakodate; Naval Battle of Hakodate; Saga Rebellion; Satsuma Rebellion

Count Yamada Akiyoshi (山田 顕義; November 18, 1844 – November 11, 1892) was a Japanese politician, samurai, and one of the early leaders of the Meiji Restoration. He served as Minister of Justice from 1885 to 1891. In his youth he was commonly known as Yamada Ichinojō; however, he changed his name frequently during the Bakumatsu period.

== Biography ==
=== Early career as a samurai ===
Yamada was born in Abu District, Nagato Province (in what is now part of the city of Hagi, Yamaguchi), and was the son of a samurai official of the Chōshū Navy with a 102 koku territory. After studies at the domain's Meirinkan Academy (where he studied the Yagyū Shinkage-ryū school of Japanese swordsmanship), he joined the Shōkasonjuku Academy run by Yoshida Shōin in June 1857. He was the youngest student of the Shōkasonjuku. He was in the retinue of Chōshū daimyō Mōri Motonori in Kyoto in the autumn of 1862. A strong supporter of the sonnō jōi movement, he signed his name in blood (together with Takasugi Shinsaku, Kusaka Genzui, Itō Hirobumi, Inoue Kaoru, Shinagawa Yajirō) to a petition to rid Japan of the foreigners. After Chōshū forces were driven from Kyoto by supporters of the kōbu gattai movement, he went into exile with Sanjō Sanetomi. During this period, he studied western military science under Ōmura Masujirō. He soon had the opportunity to put his training to practical use during the Kinmon incident, Shimonoseki Campaign, and Second Chōshū expedition. Despite his youth, he subsequently played a major role in the Boshin War, commanding a group of 700 men under the authority of Chōshū daimyō Mōri Takachika, starting with the Battle of Toba–Fushimi, and also commanding Satchō Alliance naval forces in Mutsu Bay.

=== Meiji restoration ===
In June 1869, Yamada was received in an audience (together with Kuroda Kiyotaka) and appointed Hyōbu no dai-jō (senior staff officer in the Ministry of War). This rank became that of major general in the fledgling Imperial Japanese Army in July 1871. On 22 October 1871, he set sail for the United States as a member of the Iwakura Mission. Visiting San Francisco, Salt Lake City, Chicago, and Washington DC, he also went to Philadelphia to view the Philadelphia Naval Shipyards. He then returned to Japan via Paris, Berlin, the Netherlands, Belgium, Lausanne, Bulgaria and Russia. He also visited the 1873 Vienna World Exposition, returning to Japan 2 June 1873. On his return, he was named Envoy Extraordinary and Minister Plenipotentiary to Qing China to negotiate the opening of diplomatic relations, however, Kido Takayoshi went in his place, as Yamada was called upon to use military force to suppress the Saga Rebellion and subsequently the Satsuma Rebellion by disgruntled ex-samurai. On 5 July 1874 he was appointed Justice Lord under the daijō-kan system, which he held to 10 September 1879. He was awarded the Order of the Rising Sun, 2nd class in 1875, and was promoted to lieutenant general in November 1878.

The following year, Yamada was appointed a sangi (councillor), and served as head of the Minister of Industry (1879–1880), Home Minister (1881–1883) and Minister of Justice under the first Itō, Kuroda, first Yamagata and Matsukata cabinets (1883–1891). In addition, he helped develop the modern Japanese legal code/ During his visit to France as a member of the Iwakura Mission, he was convinced that the Napoleonic Code of "law takes precedence over the military", was necessary for Japan. He also helped establish both the Koten Kokyusho (present-day Kokugakuin University) and the Nihon Horitsu Gakko)(present-day Nihon University).

Yamada was elevated to count (hakushaku) in the kazoku peerage on July 7, 1884, and served as a member of the House of Peers (Japan) from its establishment in 1890. On January 28, 1892, he was appointed to a seat in the Privy Council but died in November of the same year at the age of 49, while inspecting the Ikuno Silver Mine in Asago, Hyōgo. He was posthumously awarded the Order of the Paulownia Flowers. His grave is at the Buddhist temple of Gokoku-ji in Tokyo. He was posthumously promoted to the honorific title of Senior Second Court Rank.

== Decorations ==
- 1877 – Order of the Rising Sun, 2nd class
- 1879 – Grand Cordon of the Order of the Rising Sun
- 1888 – Medal of Honor, Yellow ribbon
- 1892 – Order of the Rising Sun with Paulownia Flowers
