= Yoshida Shōin =

Japanese politician (1830–1859)

Senior Fourth Rank Yoshida Shōin
- 吉田 松陰
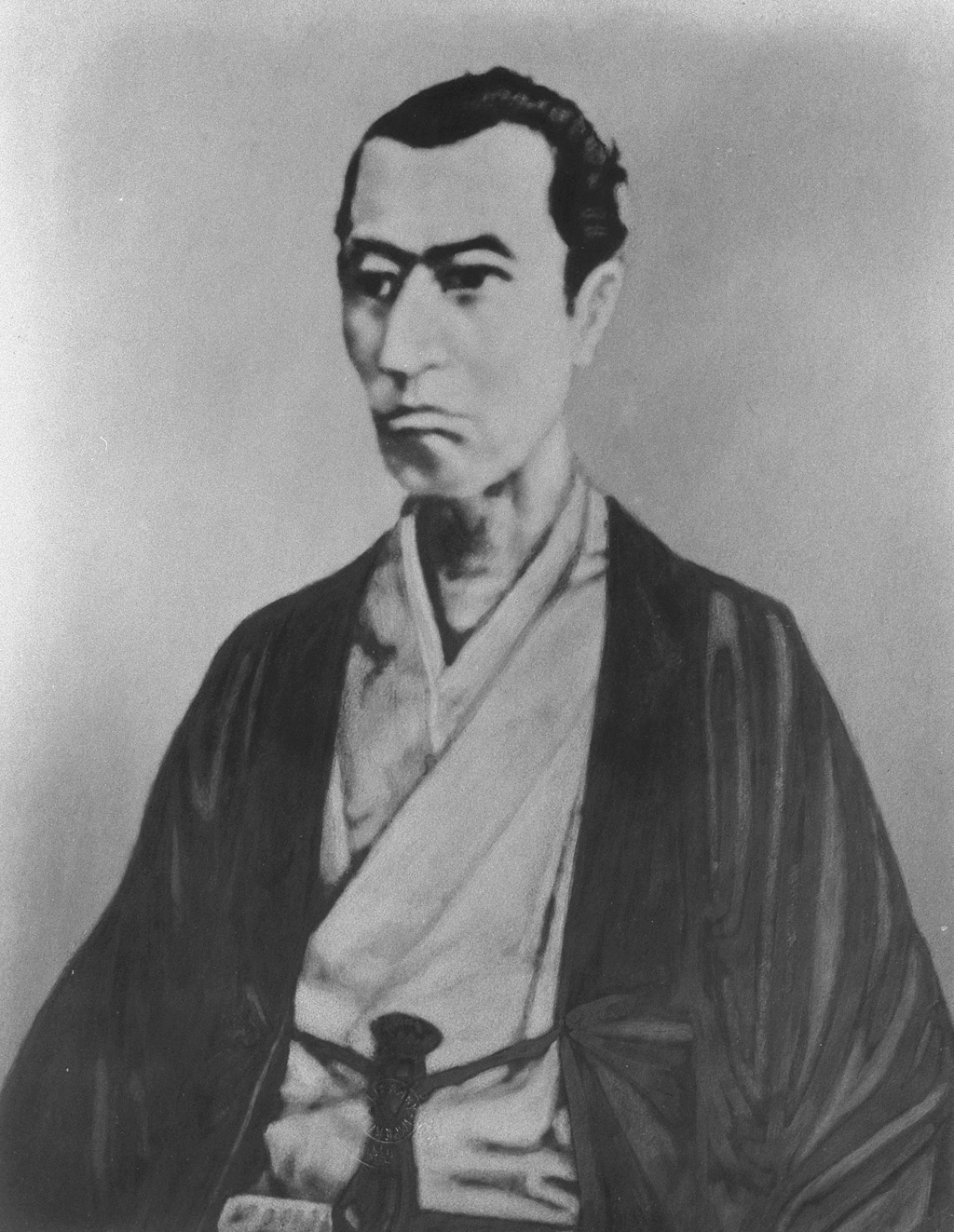
- Born: Sugi Toranosuke (杉 寅之助); September 20, 1830; Hagi, Nagato, Japan
- Died: November 21, 1859 (aged 29); Edo, Japan
- Cause of death: Decapitation
- Other name: Torajirō (寅次郎)
- Occupation: scholar
- Parent(s): Sugi Yurinosuke (father); Kodama Taki (mother)
- Relatives: Sugi Umetarō (brother); Kodama Yoshiko (sister); Odamura Hisa (sister); Sugi Tsuya (sister); Miwako Katori (sister); Sugi Toshisaburō (brother) Tamaki Bunnoshin (uncle); Yoshida Daisuke (adoptive father)

Academic background
- Academic advisors: Yusuke Yamada; Sakuma Shōzan; Asaka Gonsai; Miyabe Teizō; Yamaga Sosui

Academic work
- Era: Edo period
- Institutions: Meirinkan; Shōka Sonjuku
- Notable students: Takasugi Shinsaku; Kido Takayoshi; Akane Taketo; Itō Hirobumi; Kusaka Genzui; Inoue Kaoru; Yamagata Aritomo

Yoshida Shōin (吉田 松陰; Japanese pronunciation: [jo.ɕi.da (|) ɕoꜜː.iɴ], born Sugi Toranosuke (杉 寅之助); September 20, 1830 – November 21, 1859), commonly named Torajirō (寅次郎), was one of Japan's most distinguished intellectuals in the late years of the Tokugawa shogunate. He devoted himself to nurturing many ishin shishi who in turn made major contributions to the Meiji Restoration.

== Early life ==
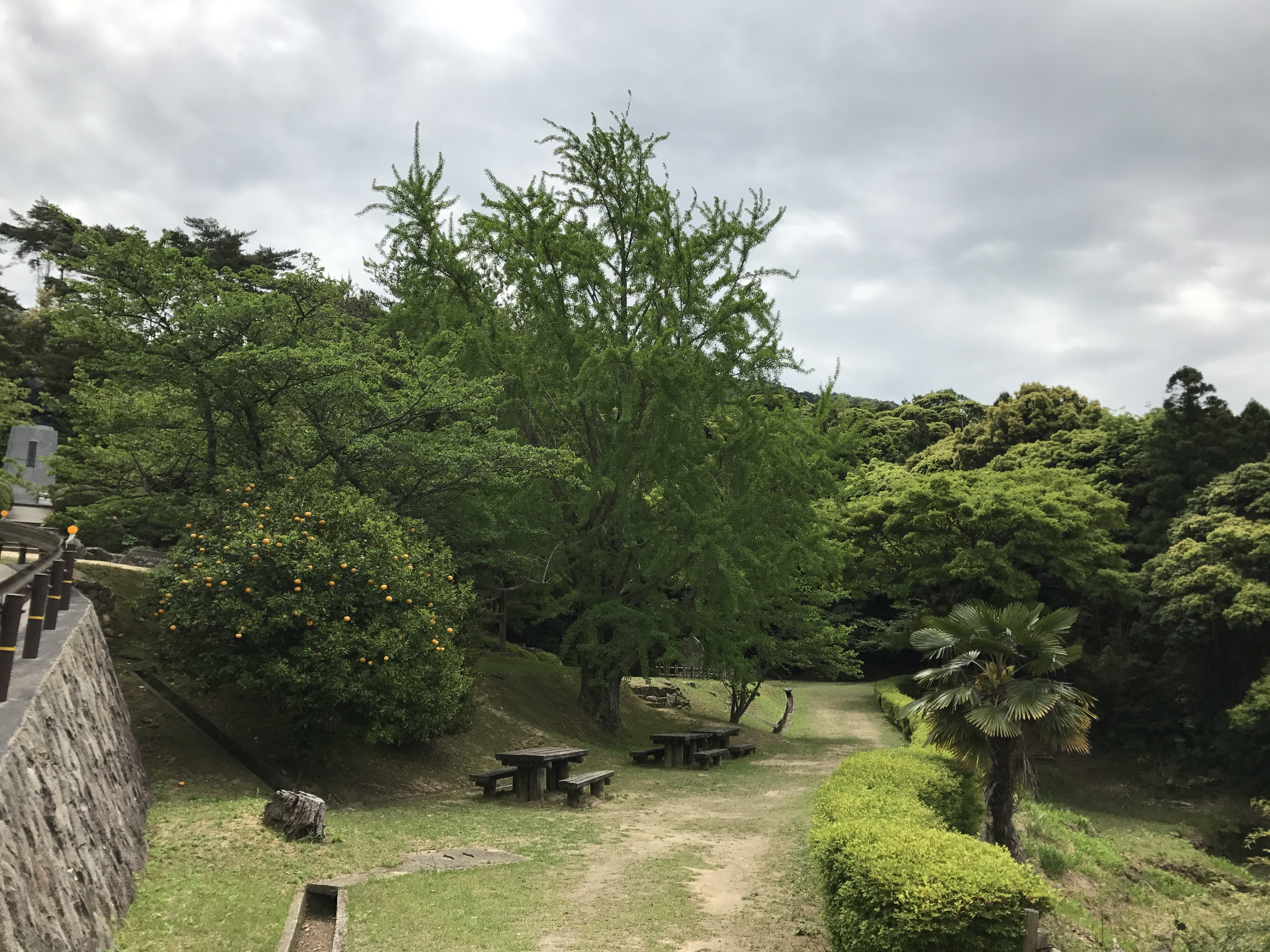
Birthplace of Yoshida Shōin

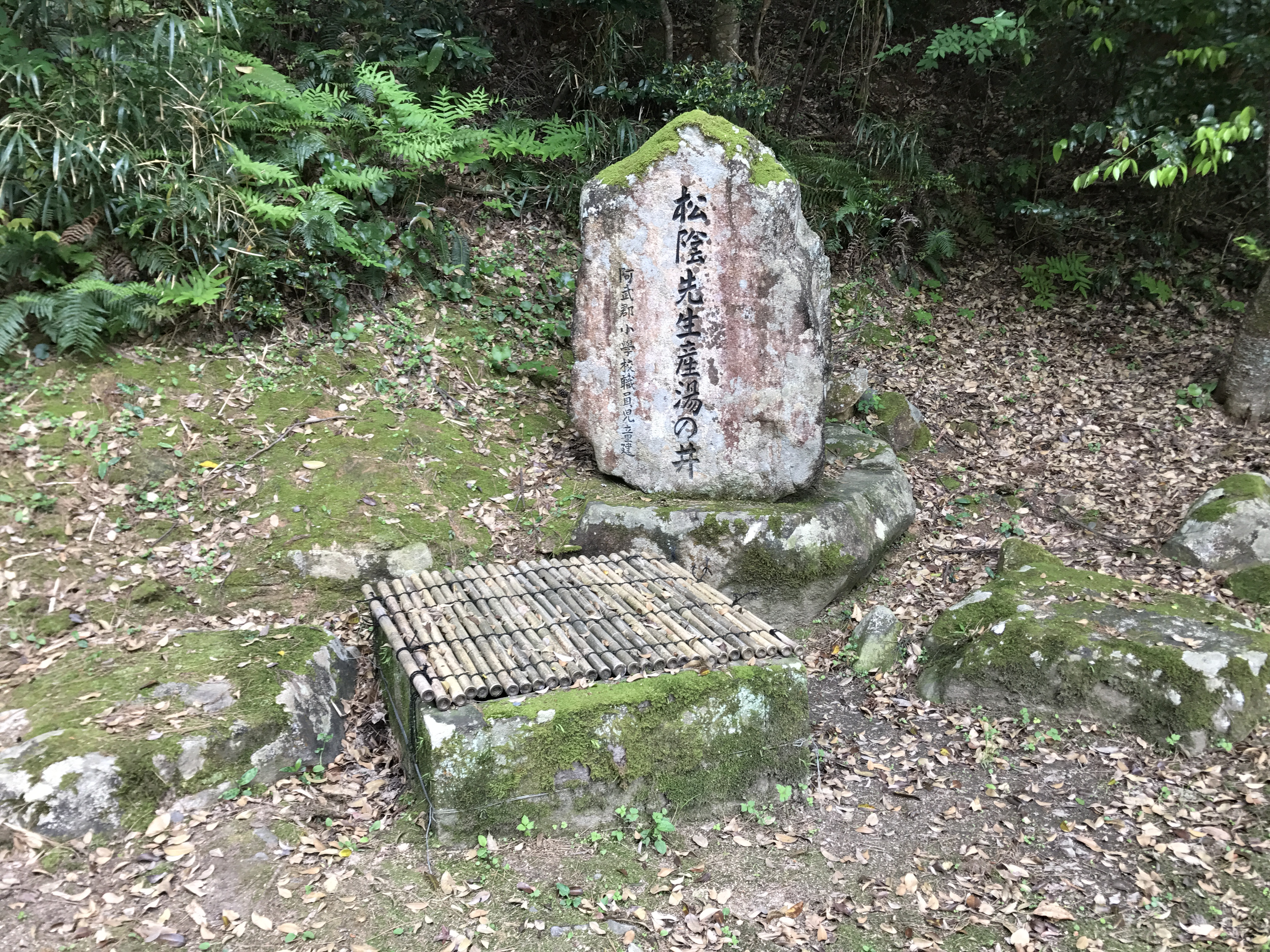
Well of first bath of Yoshida Shōin

Born Sugi Toranosuke in Hagi in the Chōshū region of Japan, he was the second son of Sugi Yurinosuke (1804–1865), a modest rank Samurai and his wife Kodama Taki (1807–1890). Yurinosuke had two younger brothers, Yoshida Daisuke and Tamaki Bunnoshin. Sugi Toranosuke's eldest brother was Sugi Umetarō (1828–1910), his four younger sisters were Sugi Yoshiko (later Kodama Yoshiko) (1832–1924), Sugi Hisa (later Odamura Hisa) (1839–1881), Sugi Tsuya (1841–1843), and Sugi Fumi (later Katori Miwako) (1843–1921), his youngest brother was Sugi Toshisaburō (1845–1876).

Sugi Toranosuke was later adopted at the age of four by Yoshida Daisuke and was renamed to Yoshida Shōin. The process of adopting younger sons from the Sugi house was established generations before Shoin's birth. To avoid financial insolvency, the Sugi house controlled two additional samurai lineages-the Tamaki and the Yoshida lineages. The oldest male became the Sugi heir and the younger Sugi sons were adopted by the Tamaki and Yoshida lines as their heirs-to ensure the Sugi succession was protected, this required the head of the house in the Yoshida line and most generations the Tamaki line to remain unmarried. Daisuke, already in ill health, died one year later at the age of 28, leaving Yoshida Shoin as the heir of the Yoshida lineage at five years of age. His house was also the instructor to the daimyō in military studies.

Due to Shōin's young age, four men were appointed to represent the Yoshida house as instructors. Shōin's younger uncle, Tamaki, set about accelerating Shōin's education to prepare the boy for his eventual duties to be trained as a Yamaga instructor. In 1839 at the age of 9, he was taught by a military art instructor at Meirinkan. At the age of 11, his talent was recognized for his excellent performance for his lecture to the daimyō Mōri Takachika. At the age of 13, he led the Chōshū forces to conducted a Western fleet extermination exercise.

In 1845, he received a lecture on the Naganuma Military Arts by Yusuke Yamada. In 1851, he went to Edo and studied the Western military science under Sakuma Shōzan and Asaka Gonsai. In 1851, he studied under Miyabe Teizō and Yamaga Sosui from the Higo Domain. This period of intense study suggests a formative experience that shaped Shōin into an educator and activist that helped spur the Meiji Restoration.

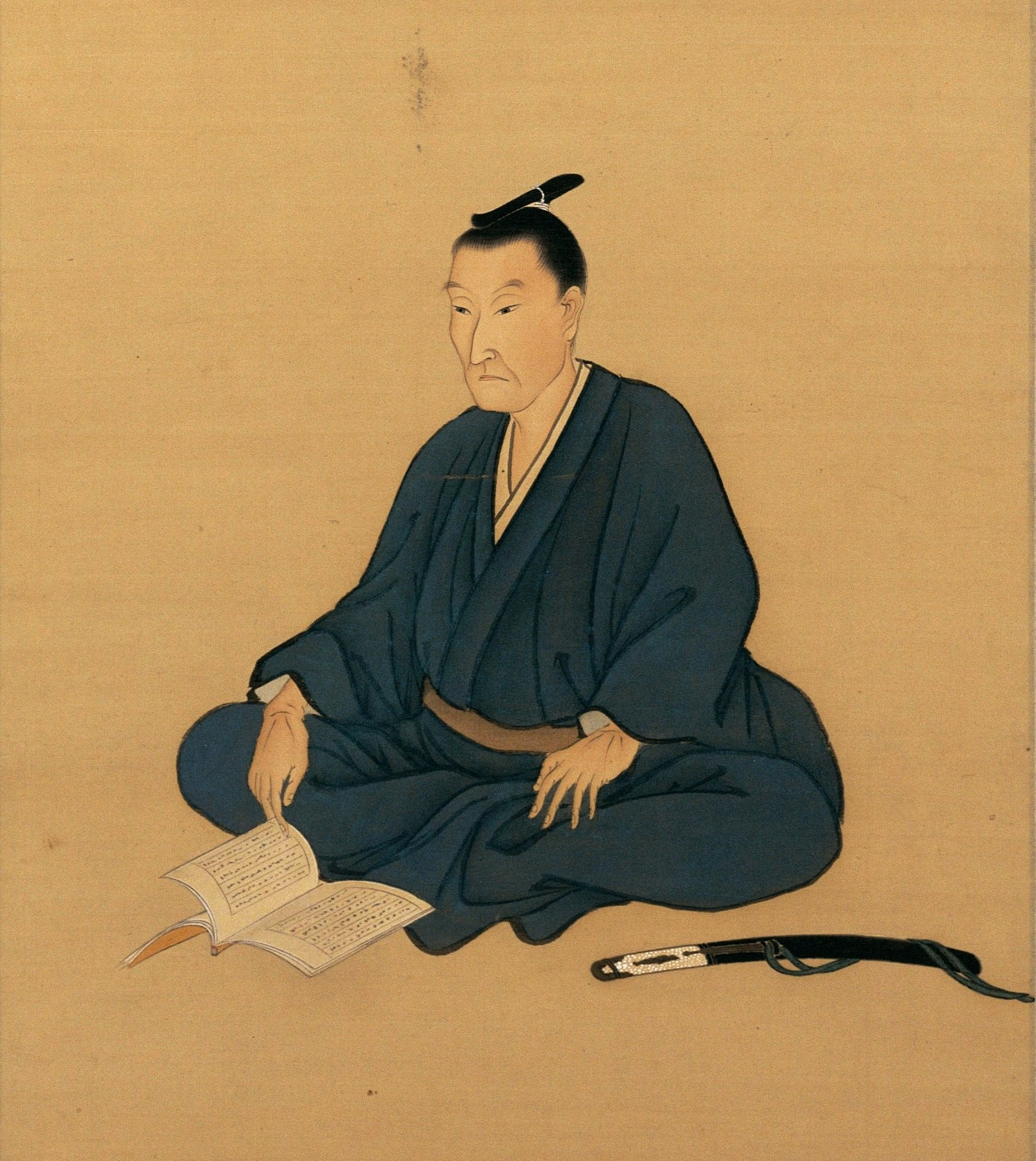
Yoshida Shōin

== Rewards of punishment ==
At the end of 1851, Yoshida left for a four-month trip across Northeastern Japan. He had been granted verbal permission from the Chōshū government but left before receiving his written permission in an act of defiance. This act of defiance was a serious offense known as dappan or "fleeing the han". He returned to Hagi in 1852. His punishment from the daimyō was costly but sweet for Shōin. He was stripped of his samurai status and his stipend of 57 koku with it. His father, Sugi Yurinosuke, was appointed as his guardian. Shōin was then granted 10 years of leisure in which he could study in any part of Japan that he chose.

On January 16, 1853, Yoshida Shōin was granted permission to return to Edo to continue his studies. His timing for his return to Edo turned out to coincide with Matthew Perry’s arrival in Japan.

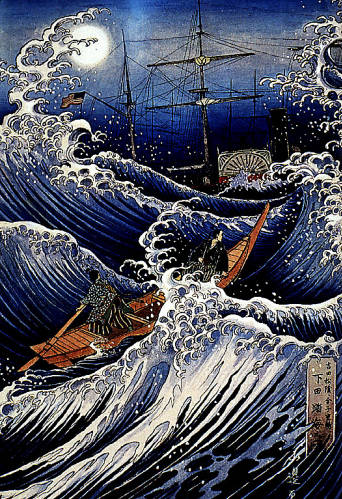
Yoshida Shōin headed for the Black Ships

== Attempt to escape and imprisonment ==
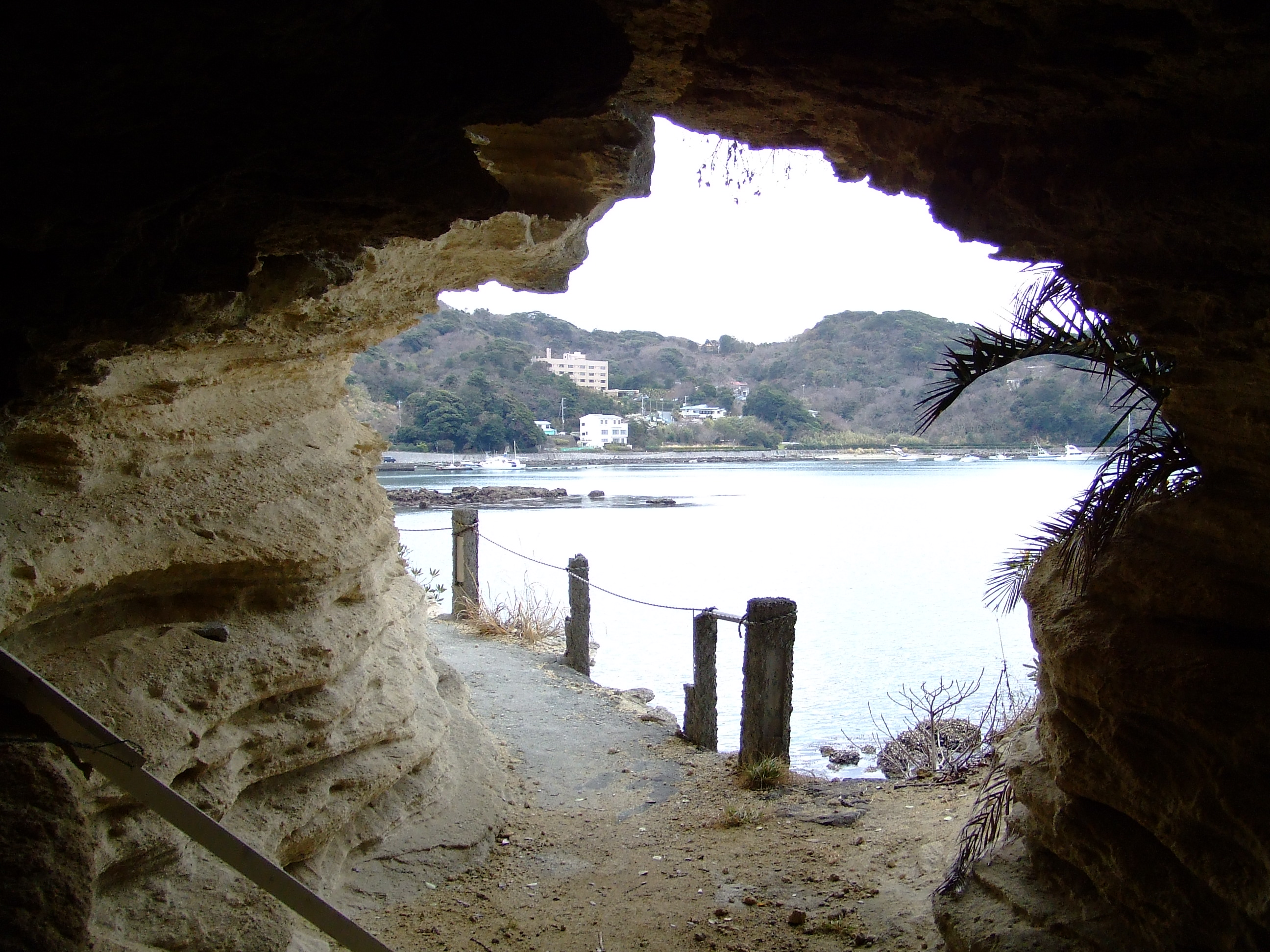
The cave where Yoshida hid overnight before trying to board a 'black ship'

In 1853, when Perry arrived in Uraga, Shōin and his teacher Sakuma Shōzan observed the Black Ships from afar and were deeply impressed by the advanced Western civilization. At this time, he sent a letter to his comrade Miyabe Teizō, in which he wrote, "All we can do is wait for spring, autumn, and winter, when they will come again. This is the perfect time to demonstrate the sharpness of the Japanese sword." In August, he submitted a written opinion in which he argued that the daimyō should unite to assist the shogunate and deal with foreign invasions. As Shōin was a rōnin (masterless samurai), submitting such a political treatise was regarded as an act of sedition. After that, at the recommendation of Shōzan, he decided to study abroad. He decided to board a Russian warship docked in Nagasaki. However, due to the Crimean War in Europe, the ship departed earlier than scheduled, preventing his attempt.

In 1854, when Perry returned to conclude the Treaty of Peace and Amity between Japan and the United States, Shōin went to Shimoda in Izu Province, where Perry's fleet was anchored. He used aliases to evade the authorities and stayed at the Okamura-ya inn in Okagata-mura (near present-day Shimoda 4-chome), to observe the American fleet. At the time, Shōin was suffering from a skin disease and had visited the public bath connected to Rendai-ji temple for treatment using the hot springs, where by chance, he met Murayama Yukimaro, a village doctor, and thanks to his kindness, he was able to stay at the Murayama residence for a while. The Murakami residence, with the second floor room where Shōin stayed has been preserved, and in 1941 was designated as Shizuoka Prefectural Historic Site.

With his companion Kaneko Shigetske, Shōin stole a small fisherman's boat and rowed it to the flagship USS Powhatan, attempting to board on March 27, but he was refused and turned over to the authorities at the Shimoda Magistrate's Office. Sent to Tenmachō Prison in Edo, he faced an automatic death penalty, but his sentence was reduced through the intervention of Kawaji Toshiakira, the senior councilors Matsudaira Tadakata and Abe Masahiro. After being sent back to Chōshū in a cage, he were imprisoned in Noyama Prison in Hagi. While in prison, he lectured on the Analects and Mencius to the other 11 fellow prisoners, and wrote "Record of Imprisonment," detailing his motives for attempting to stowaway on the American warship. In 1855, he were released from prison but were confined house arrest at the Sugi family residence, the place where he had been born. From 1856, he began lecturing to his followers, using small room as a classroom.

The former Sugi family residence, a single-story wooden building consisting of three 8-tatami mat rooms, three 6-tatami mat rooms, and one 3.5-tatami mat room survives. While the building has been repaired in later years, the room where he was imprisoned, approximately 3.5 tatami mats in size, remains preserved in its original state. The house has been designated a National Historic Site in 1922.

In 1857, Shōin was released from house arrest, but forbidden to leave Chōshū. He took over the Shōkasonjuku Academy, which had been run by his uncle. His numerous followers included Kusaka Genzui, Takasugi Shinsaku, Ito Hirobumi, Maehara Issei, Shinagawa Yajirō, Yamada Akiyoshi, and Nomura Yasushi. Since he was forbidden from travelling, he had his students travel Japan as investigators.

In 1858, upon learning that the shogunate had concluded the Treaty of Amity and Commerce without imperial sanction, Shōin became enraged and proposed the plan to capture Manabe Akikatsu, the Shogunate's chief senior councilor, on his way to Kyoto to explain the situation to Emperor Kōmei, forcing him to abrogate the treaty and carry out the expulsion of foreigners, and killing him if he refused. Shōin requested the loan of weapons and ammunition, such as cannons, from his domain to carry out the plan, but was refused. He also planned to wait for Mōri Takachika, who was passing through Fushimi on sankin-kōtai, and to persuade him to enter Kyoto with his forces. However, most of his disciples and friends, either opposed or urged caution regarding his plans. In response, Shōin grew even more radical and began advocating for a grassroots uprising to overthrow both the government of Chōshū, but the shogunate itself. As a result, he was again imprisoned in Noyama Prison. Around this time, the Tairō Ii Naosuke, was suppressing sonnō jōi rebels in Kyōto, Edo, and eventually the provinces. Many of Shōin's followers were caught up in the dragnet. Shōin himself was transferred back to Tenmacho Prison in Edo in 1859. He was questioned directly by the Hyōjōsho (Council of State) and willingly confessed to the plot to assassinate the rōjū and intercept Manabe Akikatsu. As a result, he was sentenced to death.

== Death ==
It appears that Shōin did not expect to be executed until the shogunate executed three of his followers. In October 15, he recited his death poem: "Parental love exceeds one's love for his parents. How will they take the tidings of today?". Two days later in October 17, he was informed of his death sentence. When it was Yoshida's turn in November 21, he was brought to an open courtyard adjacent to the prison, and led to the scaffold. With perfect composure he kneeled atop a straw mat, beyond which was a rectangular hole dug to absorb the blood. Upon his death by decapitation, his executioner Yamada Asaemon said that he died a noble death. He was 29 years old.

After his execution, he was first buried by Itō Hirobumi and his Chōshū comrades near the execution site. In 1863, he was later reburied by his supporters at Wakabayashi, Edo.

== Posthumous influence ==
At least five of his students, Takasugi Shinsaku, Katsura Kogorō, Inoue Kaoru, Itō Hirobumi and Yamagata Aritomo later became widely known, and virtually all of the survivors of the Sonjuku group became officers in the Meiji Restoration. Takasugi led rifle companies against the shōgun's army when it failed to conquer Chōshū in 1864, rapidly leading to the fall of the Tokugawa shogunate. Itō Hirobumi became Japan's first prime minister.

== Legacy ==
In 1882, Yoshida Shōin was enshrined at Shōin shrine in Wakabayashi, Setagaya-ku (世田谷区若林4丁目35-1), in Tokyo, and the current shrine's main building was built in 1927, as well as in his birthplace Hagi, Yamaguchi Prefecture (山口県萩市椿東1537).

In 1888 Yoshida was enshrined into the Yasukuni Shrine and was posthumously awarded Senior Fourth Rank by 1889.

Shoin University was named after him. There are two other universities whose names include Shoin in Japan, but they are unrelated to him.

Hana Moyu is a 2015 Japanese television drama NHK Taiga drama series that premiered on January 4, 2015, and ended on December 13, 2015. The series starred Mao Inoue who portrayed Sugi Fumi, a younger sister of Yoshida Shōin. The role of Yoshida Shōin was played by actor Yūsuke Iseya.
