= Murata Seifū =

Japanese samurai (1783–1855)

- 村田 清風
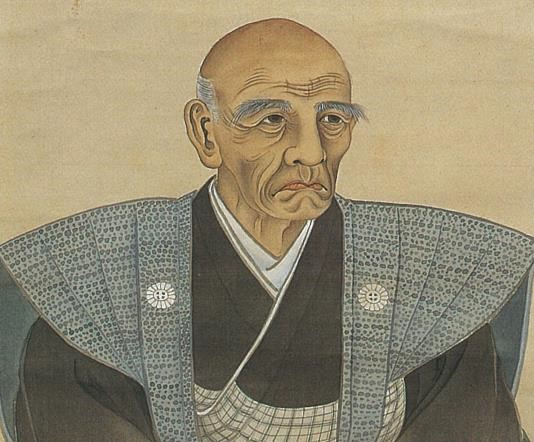
- Born: March 26, 1783; Nagato, Yamaguchi, Japan
- Died: July 9, 1855 (aged 72); Nagato, Chōshū Domain, Japan

Murata Seifū (村田 清風, May 26, 1783 – July 9, 1855) was a Japanese samurai who served as karō of Chōshū Domain in the late Edo period. Known as a prominent economic reformer, his policies greatly strengthened the domain and enabled it to carry out many of its military reforms which led to the Meiji restoration.

== Biography ==
Murata was born in Sawae, Misumi Village, Otsu District, Nagato Province as the eldest son of Murata Mitsukata, a 91 koku retainer of the Chōshū Domain. He attended the han school Meirinkan, where he had outstanding records, and in 1808, served as a page to Mōri Narifusa, the daimyō of Chōshū Domain. After that, he successively held important posts under the five daimyō from Mōri Narihiro to Mōri Takachika. In Edo, he further broadened his knowledge by learning the art of warfare and coastal defense from Hanawa Hokiichi and others, and economics from the writings of Kaiho Seiryō. In 1819, he inherited the headship of Murata family.

In 1838, Murata took over the real power of the administration of Chōshū Domain, and concurrently serving as Omote-ban-gashira and Edo Shikakukake. Under Mōri Takachika, he worked on the financial reconstruction policy accompanying the Tenpō Reforms, an array of economic policies introduced between 1841 and 1843 by the Tokugawa shogunate under the direction of Mizuno Tadakuni. Chōshū Domain suffered from severe debts, and in 1843 Murata calculated a method of paying off the debt and interest over a 37 year period. Partly to pay for this reform, he lifted the domain's monopoly on wax and allowed merchants to trade in it freely. He also imposed taxes on shipping passing through the Kanmon Straits separating Honshu and Kyushu as well as developing a domain-owned financial and warehousing hub in the port of Shimonoseki itself. Due to his reforms, the finances of Chōshū Domain began to recover. In addition, Murata devoted his efforts to popularizing education, recommending education to the common people, and in 1849 he expanded the Meirinkan.

However, Murata's reforms faced considerable opposition on many fronts. The local merchants were unhappy at increased taxes and the 37 year period over which existing debts would be slowly repaid; Osaka merchants were unhappy at the developments at Shimonoseki, fearing a decrease in the distribution of goods to Osaka. Furthermore, Mizuno Tadakuni's removal from power in 1845 led to a repeal of most of his reforms at the national level. Murata resigned after collapsing from apoplexy which resulted in partial paralysis. Although he later recovered, he devoted his efforts to education, writing a number of books. In 1855, he returned to the domain's administration, but suffered another attack of apoplexy the same year and died at the age of 73. Although Murata's reforms were only partially successful, he is credited with solidifying the foundations for the Chōshū Domain to play an active role in the Meiji Restoration.

== Murata Seifū former residence and grave ==
The house where Murata was born in 1783 still exists in what is now the city of Nagato, Yamaguchi. Although Murata spent much of his adult life in Edo, he would return to this residence on occasion, and named the residence the "Misumi Sanso". In 1845, he moved back to this house permanently and lived here to his death. The residence is a complex of buildings including a rice storehouse, a stable, a barn, and a public bath, centered on a thatched one-story main building. His grave is located at Mount Otoshiyama about 100 meters west of the old house. In 1941, both the residence and the grave were collectively designated as a National Historic Site. The Murata Seifu Memorial Museum is nearby.

== See also ==
- Tenpō Reforms

== Sources ==
- Albert M. Craig: Chōshū in the Meiji restoration, Lexington Books, 2000, ISBN 0-7391-0193-5
