= Shōin shrine =

Shinto shrine in Setagaya, Tokyo, Japan

Shōin Shrine 松陰神社
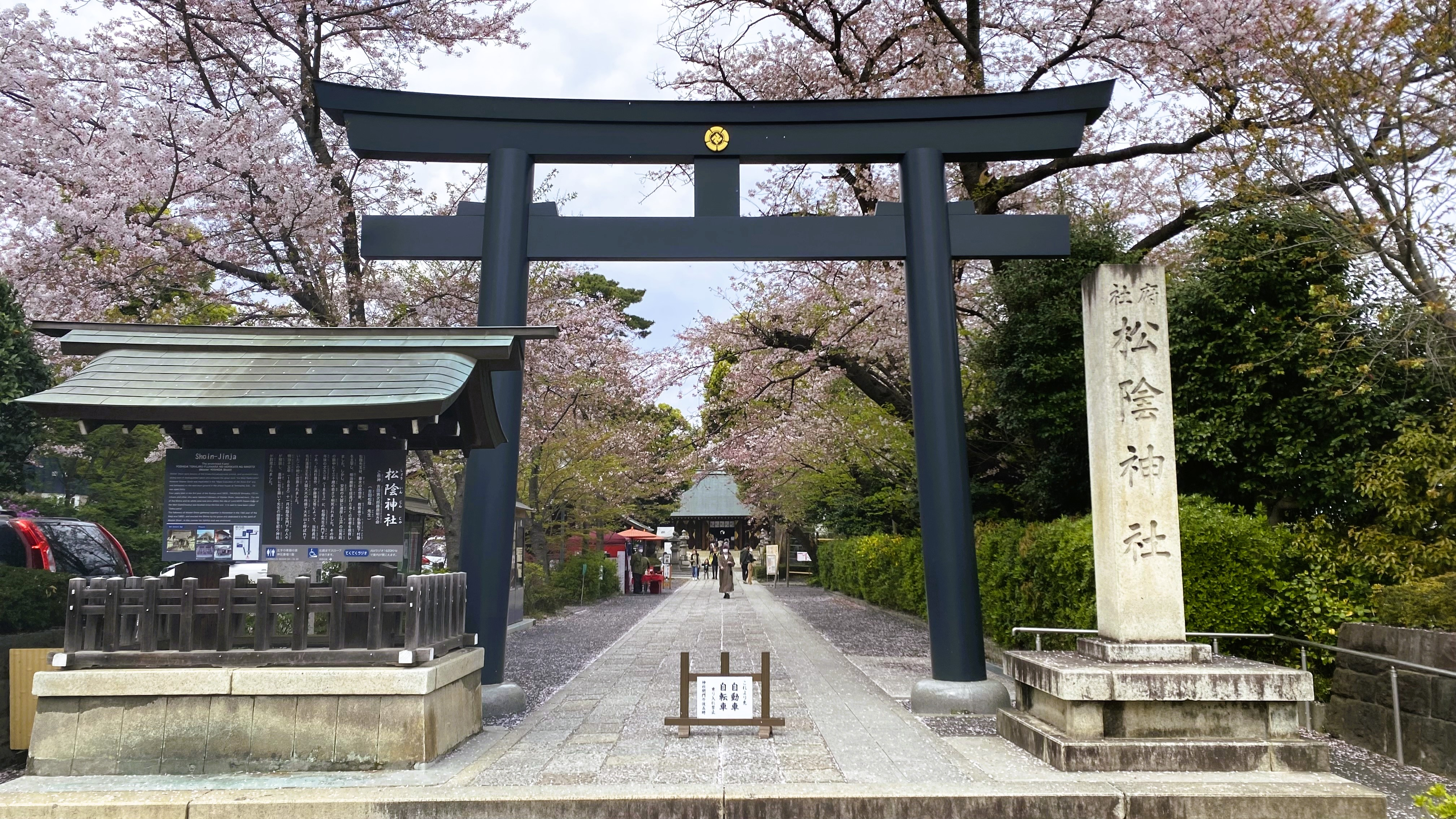
- Torii of Shōin Jinja, 2023

- Location within Japan

Religion
- Affiliation: Shinto
- Deity: Yoshida Shōin
- Leadership: 154-0023 東京都世田谷区若林4-35-1

Location
- Location: 4-35-1 Wakabayashi, Setagaya-ku, Tokyo 154-0023
- Interactive map of Shōin Shrine 松陰神社
- Coordinates: 35°38′50.04″N 139°39′21.92″E

Architecture
- Established: 1882

Website
- eng.shoinjinja.org

Shōin Shrine (松陰神社, Shōin Jinja), located in Setagaya, is the Shinto shrine that is dedicated to the deified spirit of Yoshida Shōin, an activist during the Edo era.

== History ==
Shōin was executed by the Shogunate in the prison of Tenmacho, Edo in 1859. His body was reburied in Wakabayashi by his followers in 1863. The shrine was erected in 1882, and the current main shrine building was built in 1927.

== Gallery ==
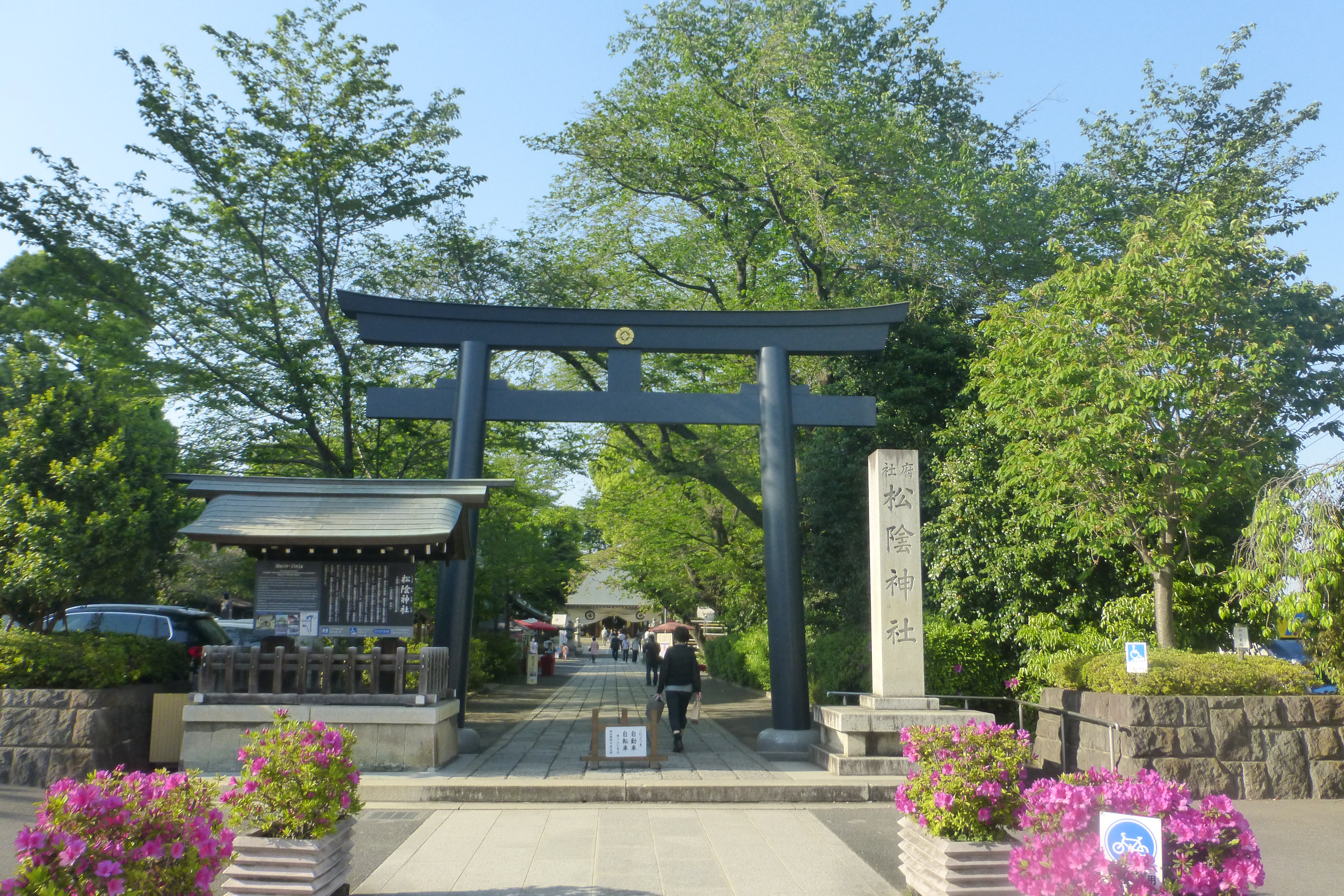
Main torii gates

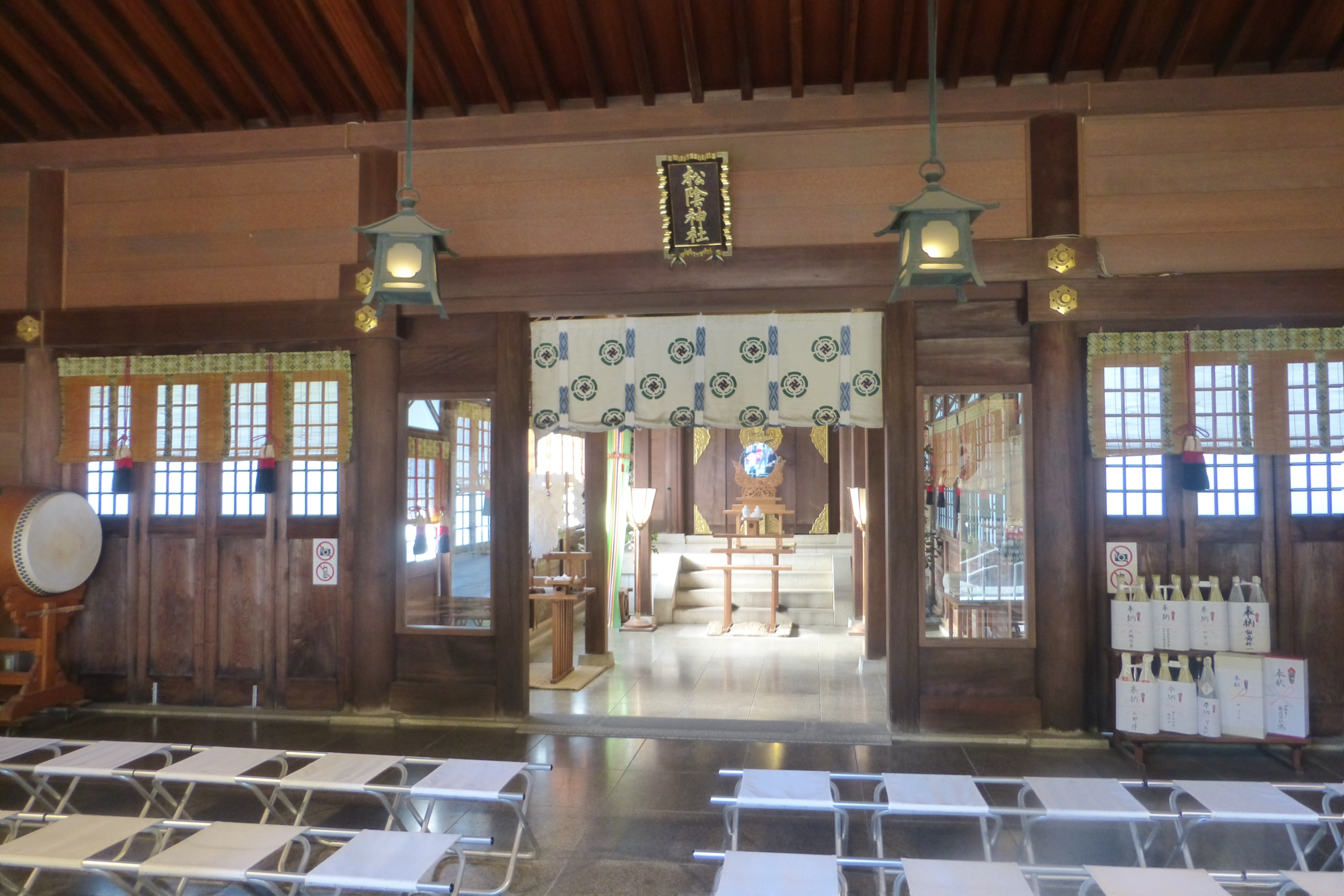
Inside the haiden

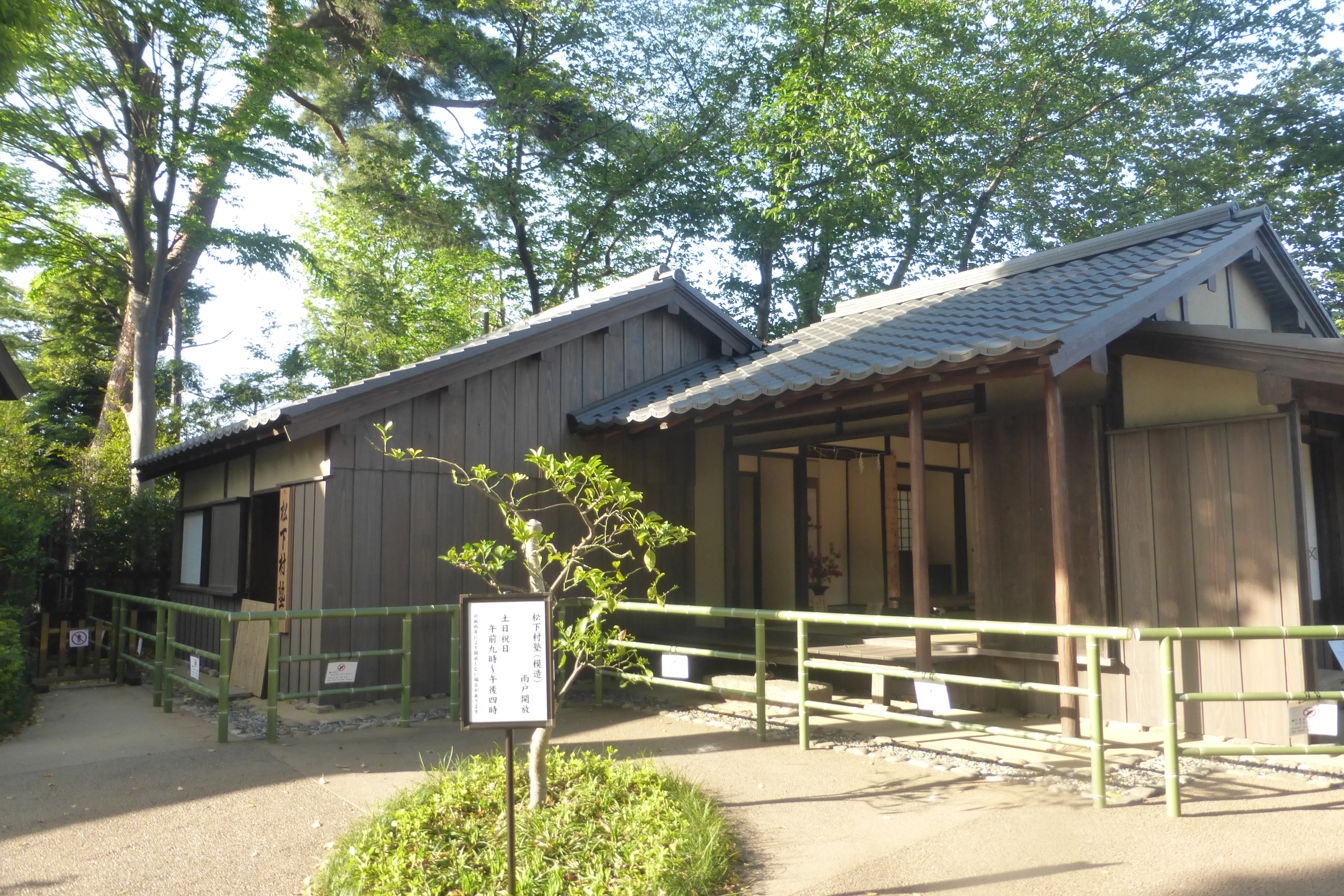
Reproduction of "Shoka-Sonjuku"

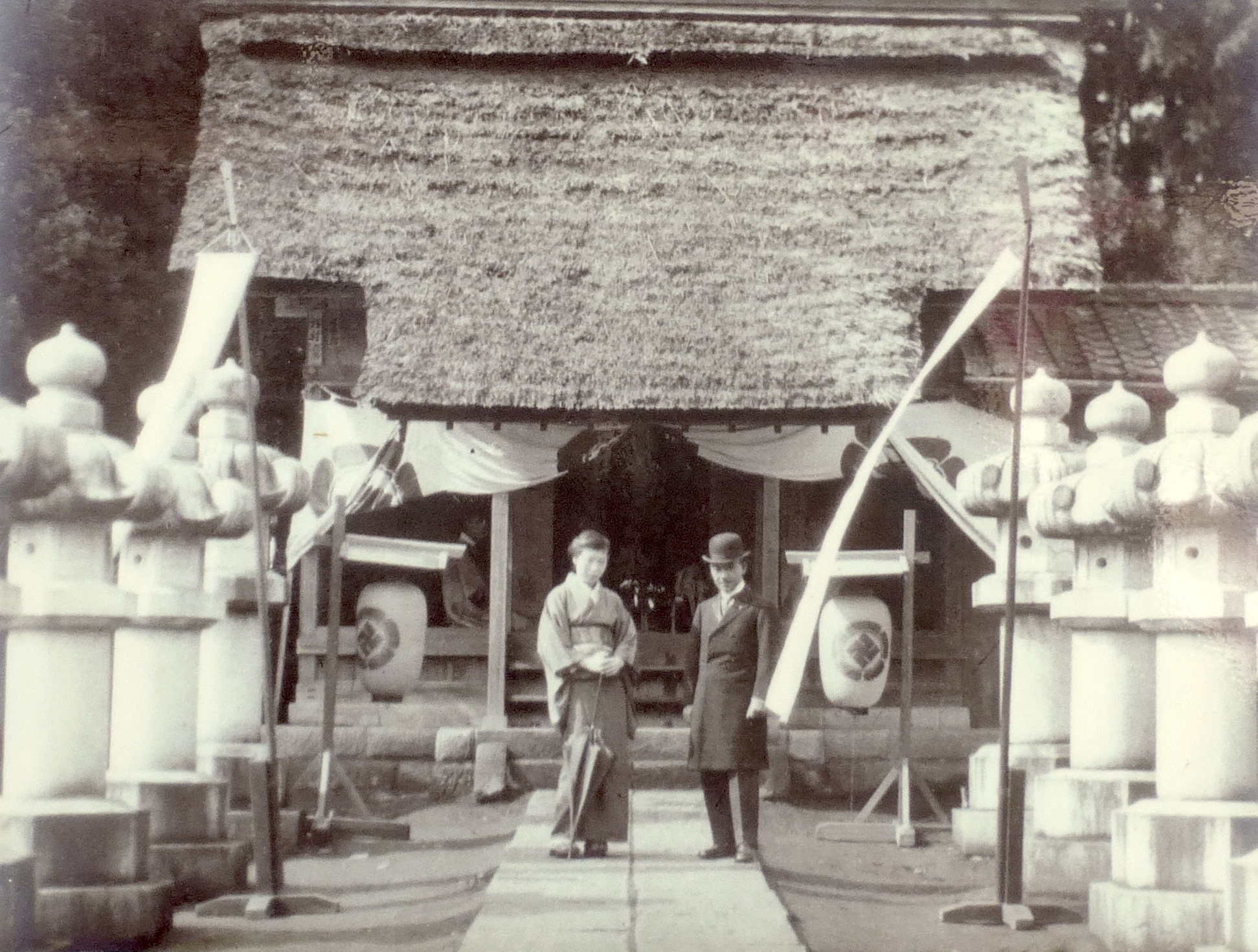
Shōin shrine in the Taishō period

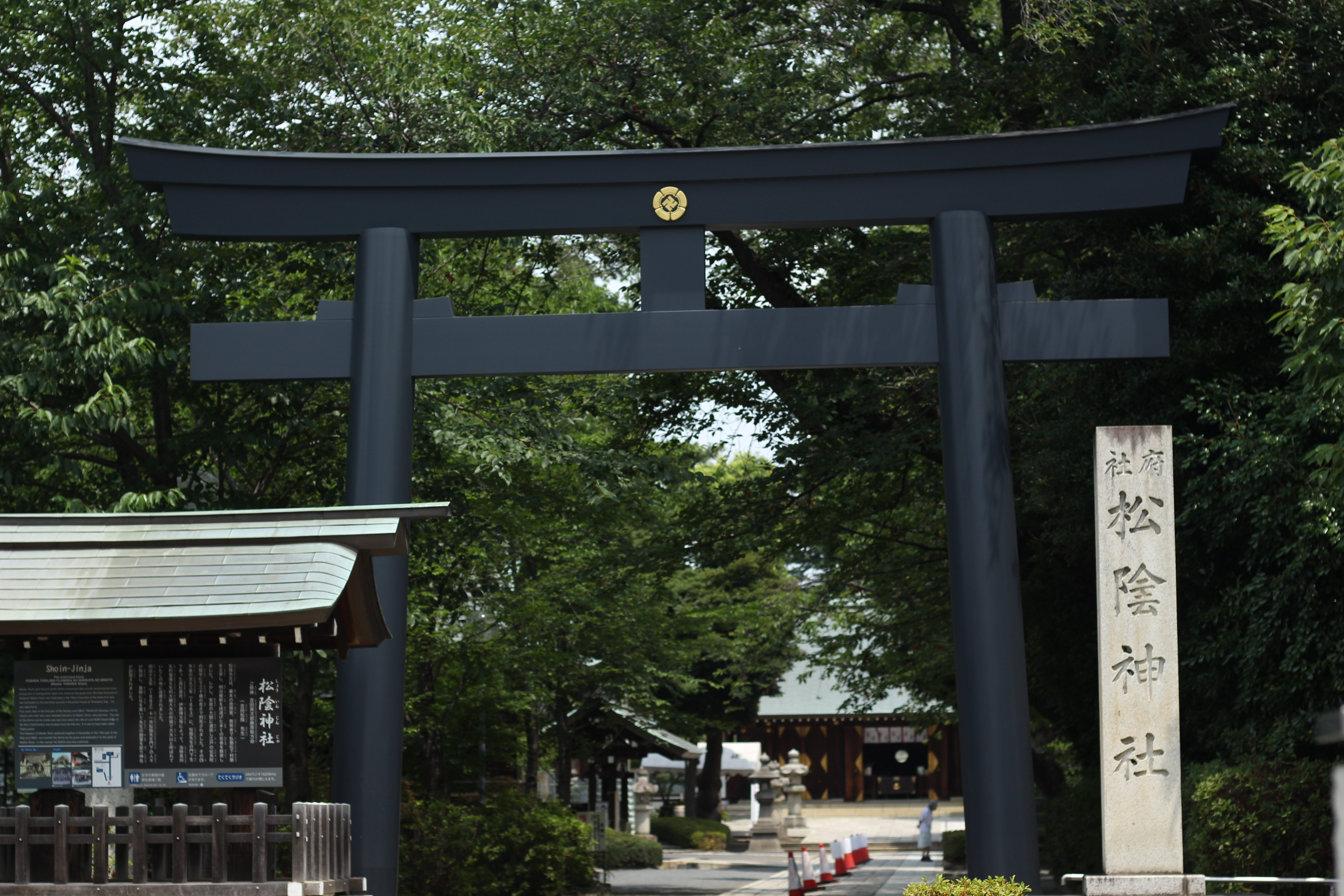
Shoin Shrine Torii Gate

== See also ==
- List of Shinto shrines
