= Meirinkan =

Coordinates: 34°24′33.82″N 131°23′56.65″E

- 明倫館
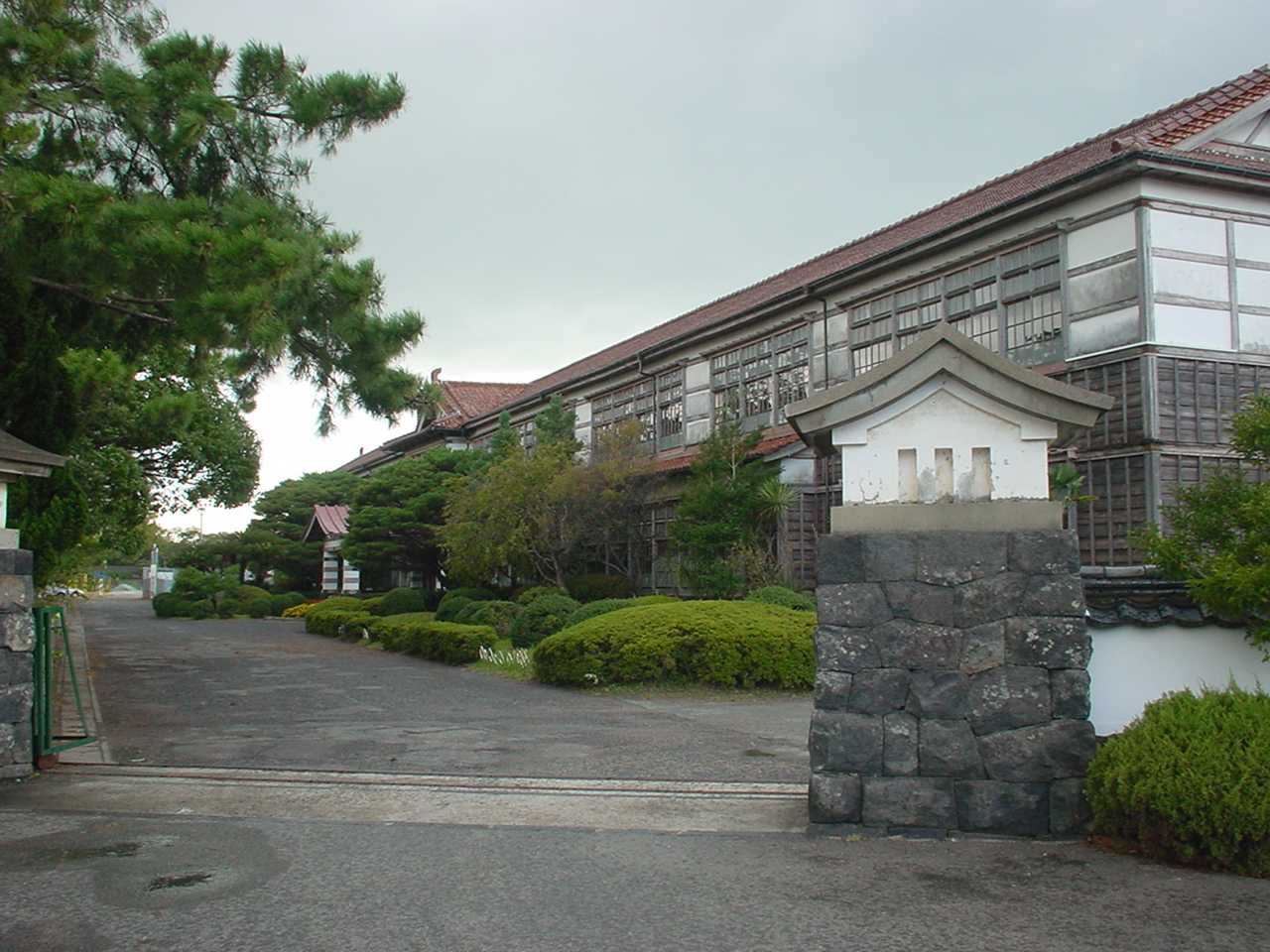
- Hagi Municipal Meirin Elementary School, built on the site of the former Hagi Meirin-kan school.

- Location within Yamaguchi Prefecture Location within Japan

General information
- Location: 1 Chome-6-29 Sannomaru, Mito, Ibaraki 310-0011, Japan
- Inaugurated: 1718
- National Historic Site of Japan

Meirinkan (明倫館) was a han school located in the Chōshū Domain of Japan. The school was one of the three major domain academies in Bakumatsu period Japan, along with the Kōdōkan in Mito Domain and Shizutani School in Okayama Domain.

== History ==
The Meirinkan was established in 1718 by the 5th daimyō of Chōshū Domain, Mōri Yoshimoto. It was the 12th of nearly 300 domain schools established throughout Japan during the Edo period. It was initially located in the San-no-maru (third enclosure) of Hagi Castle and occupied aof 940 tsubo (approximately 3,102 square meter) site. The main hall housed wooden statues of Confucius and Mencius, at its center. Martial arts halls, including swordsmanship, spearmanship, and artillery training grounds, formed the outer perimeter of the school. Mōri Yoshimoto, along with Ogura Shosai, the first head of the Meirinkan, studied at the Shoheisaka, a private school of the Hayashi clan in Edo. Therefore, many aspects of the Meirinkan's structure, curriculum, and ceremonies were modeled after the Shoheisaka. The Meirinkan provided education for training samurai who would be responsible for the domain's administration. In 1840, Yoshida Shōin (then 11 years old) gave a lecture on the "Military Teachings Complete Works" before Mōri Takachika.

The academy was relocated to Emukai in Hagi jōkamachi by the 14th daimyō Mōri Takachika in accordance with han reforms, where it covered a total area of 15,184 tsubo (50,107 m^{2}). 3,020 tsubo (9,966 m^{2}) of the area were used as military training grounds. Despite being a center for teaching Edo neo-Confucianism, the Meirinkan's collection contained many anti-Neo-Confucianism works by Ogyū Sorai and his disciples. In 1863, with the relocation of the domain's administrative office to Yamaguchi, a "Yamaguchi Meirinkan" was also established, resulting in the coexistence of the Hagi and Yamaguchi Meirinkan academies.

== Hagi Meirinkan ==
Currently, only a stone monument remains of the original Meirinkan in Hagi; no other structures from that time survive. The existing Hagi Meirinkan (萩明倫館) is currently part of Hagi City Meirin Elementary School, and its ruins were decreed a National Historic Site by the Japanese government on December 7, 1919. The wooden school building of Meirin Elementary School continued to be used until March 2014 (when it was relocated to an adjacent site in a newly constructed building). In March 2017, the entire site was redeveloped as part of the 150th anniversary of the Meiji Restoration. The main building became the "Hagi Meirin Gakusha," a tourist hub facility in Hagi City, and Building No. 2 became the "World Heritage Visitor Center" when Hagi castle town was designated a UNESCO World Heritage Site, as part of the "Sites of Japan's Meiji Industrial Revolution: Iron and Steel, Shipbuilding and Coal Mining"

Manga artist Yū Koyama's debut title, Ore wa Chokkaku (おれは直角) is set in Hagi Meirinkan.

[Meiji Restoration intellects Yoshida Shōin and Takasugi Shinsaku were both students at the Meirinkan. Other distinguished graduates include Japanese Imperial Army officer Miura Gorō, diplomat Aoki Shūzō and Kido Takayoshi, Meiji Restoration hero and Meiji statesman.

== Yamaguchi Meirinkan ==
Yamaguchi Meirinkan (山口明倫館) was moved to a large site called Kameyama Campus (亀山校地, Kameyama kōchi) in 1861, when the school was called Yamaguchi Kōshūdō. It was surrounded by a moat, located in central Yamaguchi City. The Kameyama Campus continued to serve as an educational facility for over 110 years as the Yamaguchi High School, former Yamaguchi Higher Commercial School, former Yamaguchi Economic College and finally as the current Yamaguchi University School of Business. The moat was filled in order to build a prefectural road after the school was merged into the Yoshida (Hirakawa) campus in 1973, but parts of the moat were later restored. The Yamaguchi Prefectural Museum of Art is located within the former campus grounds. Ōmura Masujirō served as an instructor for the Yamaguchi Meirinkan before the Chōshū expeditions. Yamada Akiyoshi was one of his students.

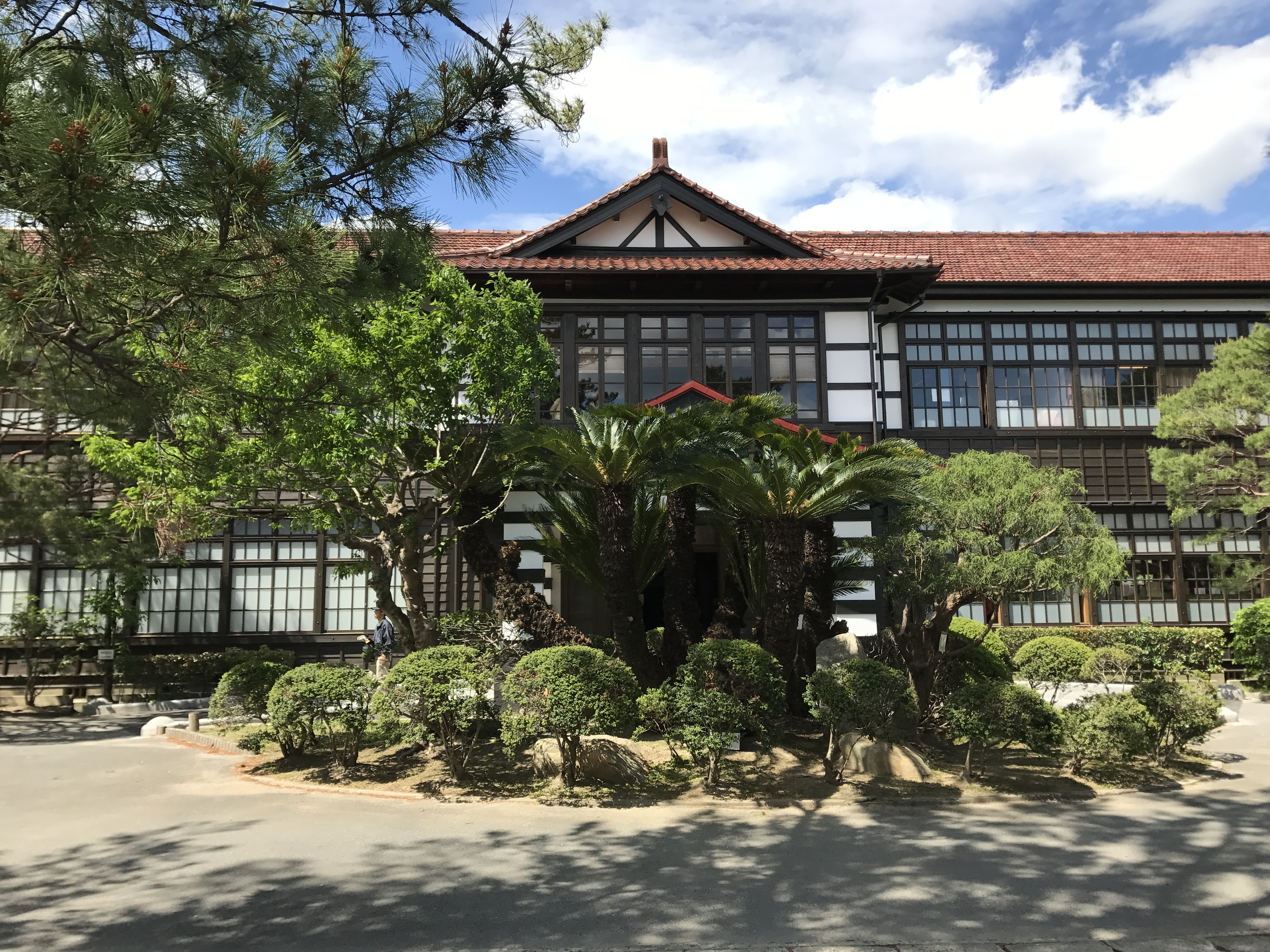
Former Meirinkan School

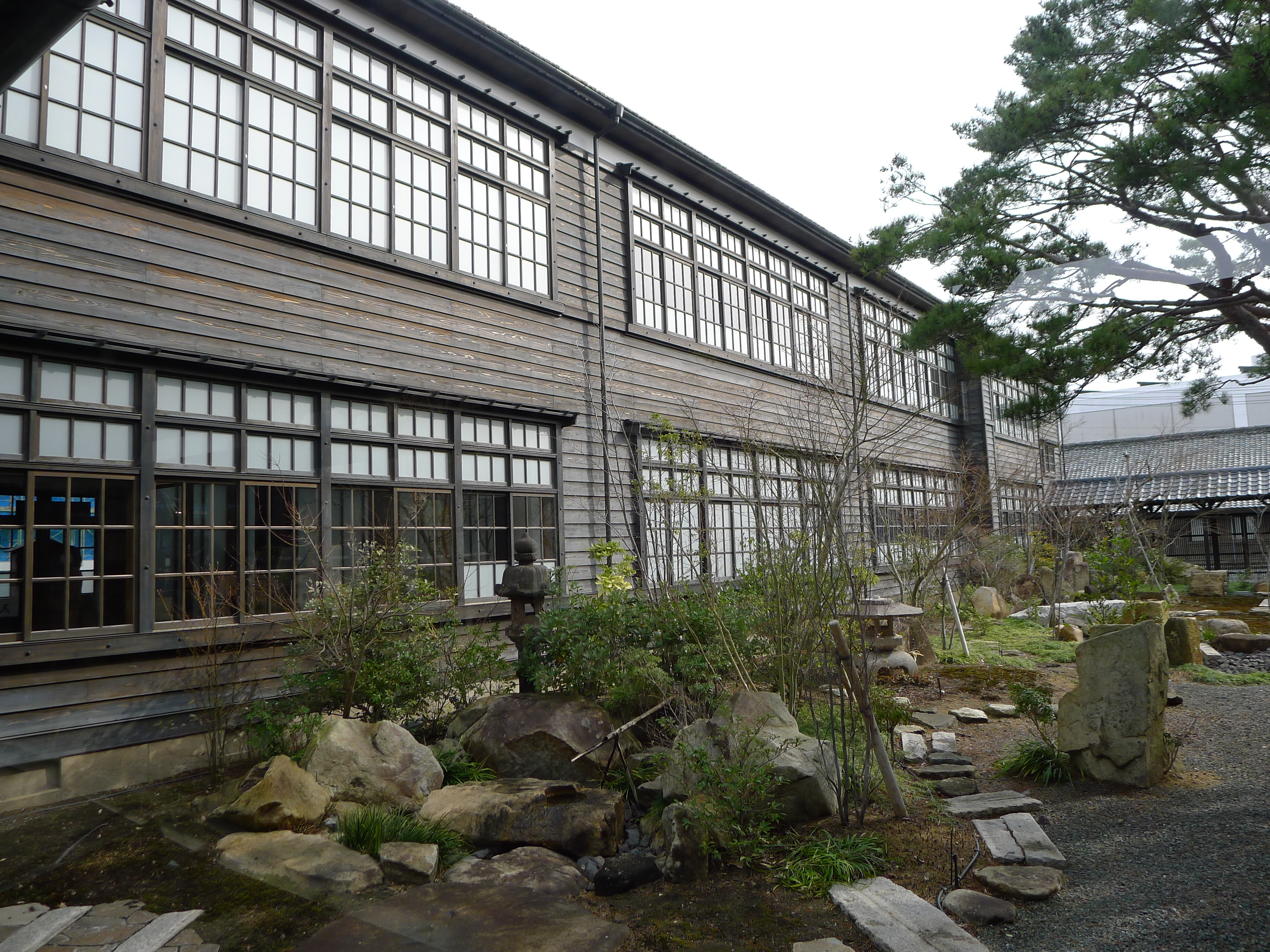
Hagi-Meirinkan 2nd Bldg (World Heritage Guidance Center)

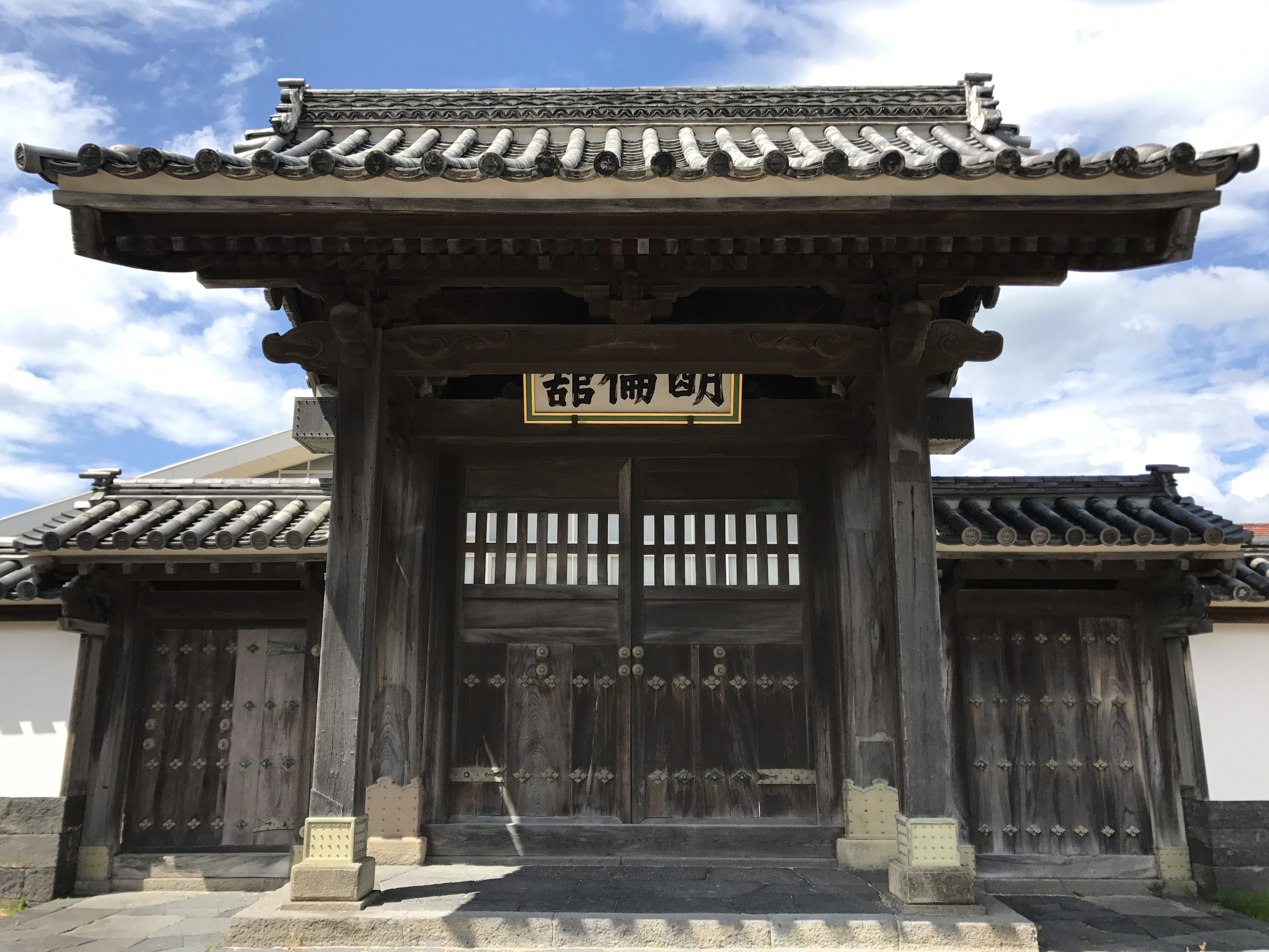
South gate

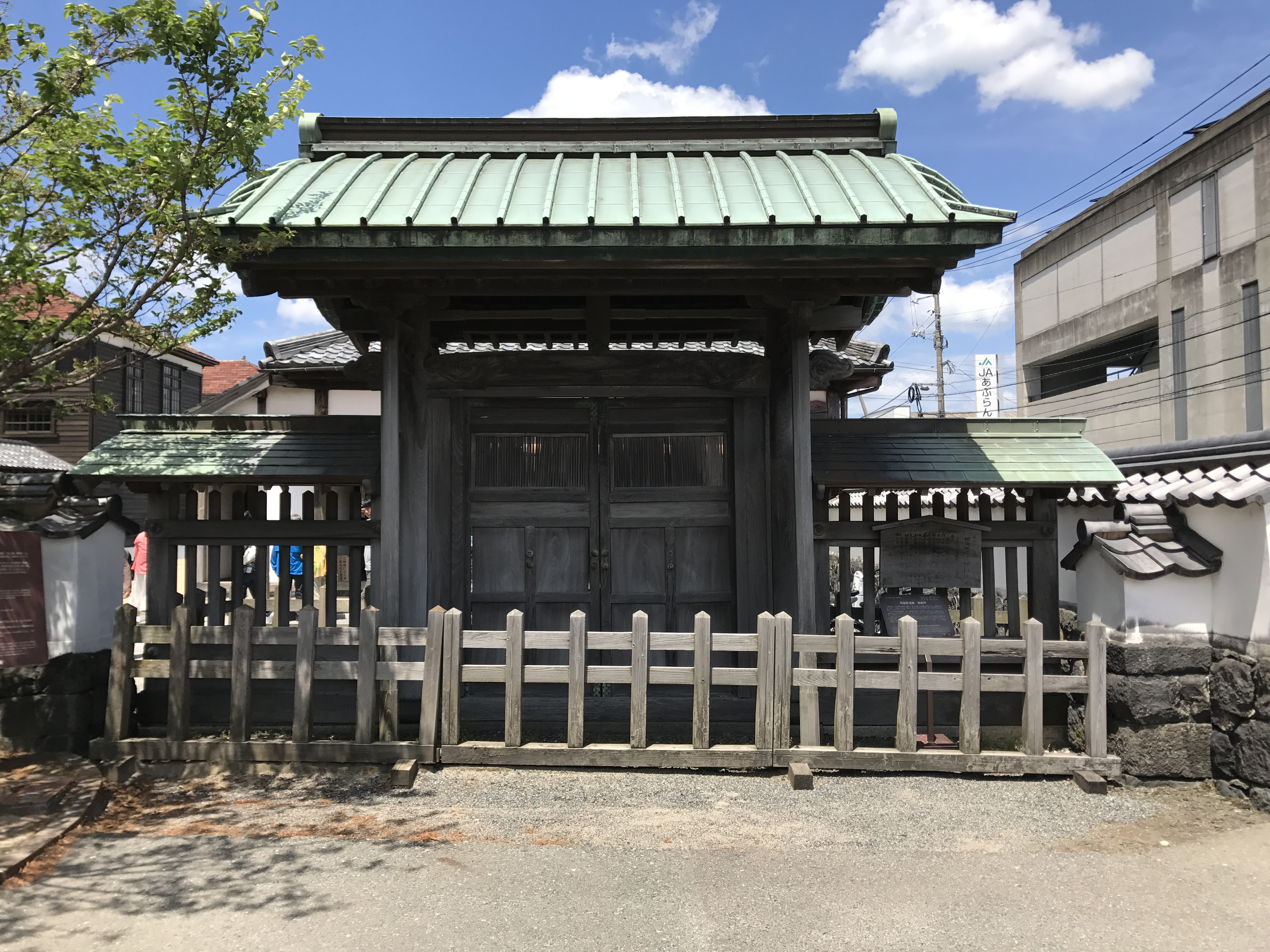
Kantokumon Gate

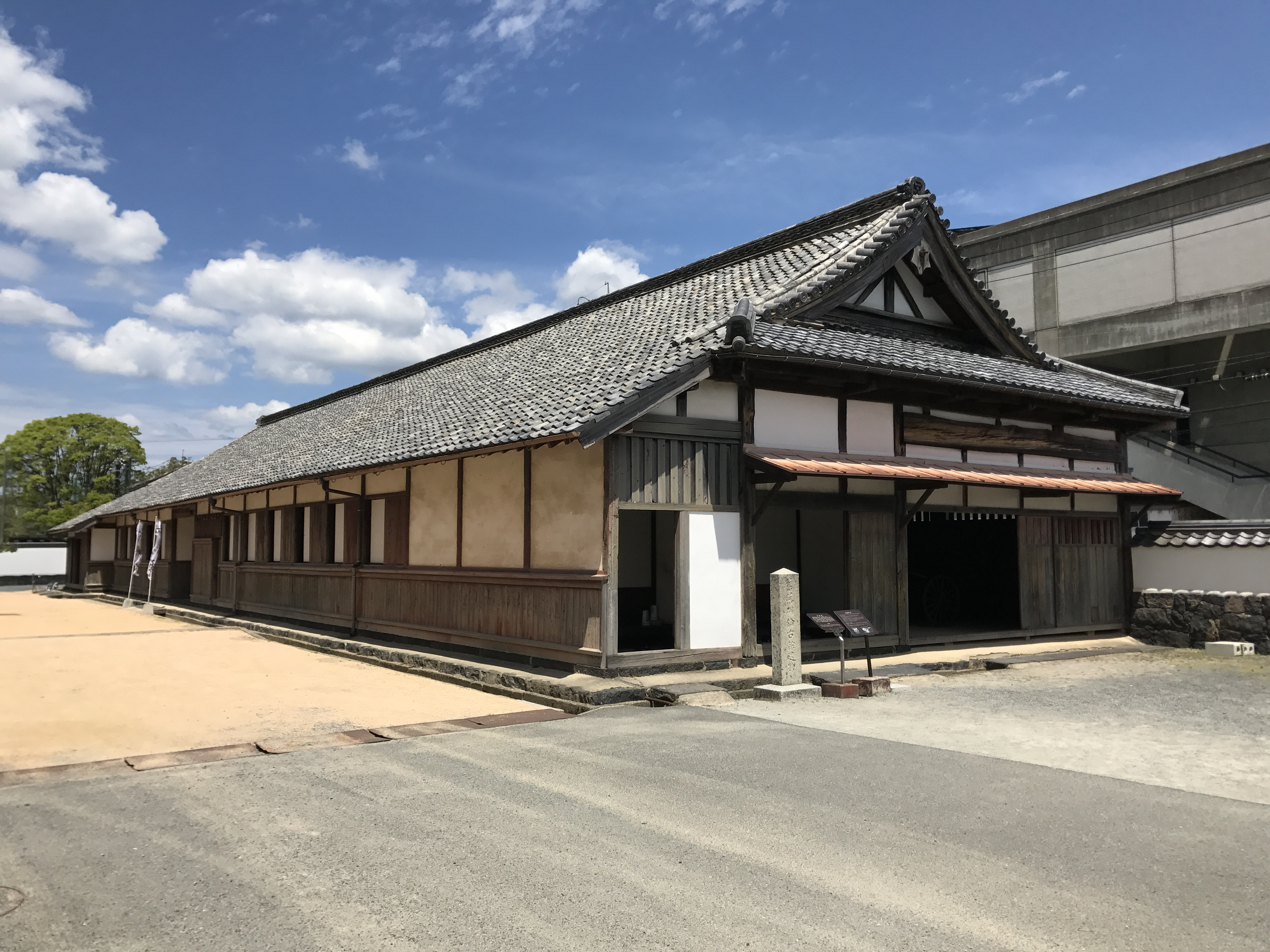
Yubikan Hall

== See also ==
- List of Historic Sites of Japan (Yamaguchi)
- History of education in Japan
- Kōdōkan
