= Battle of Hatchōoki =

Ambush in the Boshin War in Japan

- Part of the Hokuetsu Campaign of the Boshin War
Date	August 10 – September 11, 1868
Location	Nagaoka, Echigo Province (now Niigata Prefecture) 37°28′23″N 138°53′25″E
Result	Northern Alliance victory

Belligerents
Imperial forces: Chōshū Domain	Northern Alliance: Nagaoka Domain; Aizu Domain; Kuwana Domain

Commanders and leaders
Yamagata Aritomo	Kawai Tsugunosuke

Strength
	August: around 300; September: around 700

Casualties and losses
Unknown	131 dead
- Location within Japan

The Battle of Hatchōoki (八丁沖の戦い, Hatchōoki no tatakai) was an ambush in the middle of the Battle of Hokuetsu in the Boshin War by forces of Nagaoka Domain on forces loyal to the Imperial Court. The battle occurred in what is now the city of Nagaoka, in Niigata Prefecture.

== Background ==
At the final years of the Tokugawa shogunate, the army of Nagaoka Domain underwent reformation. Under the leadership of senior retainer Kawai Tsugunosuke, the Nagaoka army was organized based on the British Army at the time.

When fighting broke out in the Battle of Toba-Fushimi on January 27, 1868, over 60 Nagaoka soldiers were stationed to protect Tamatsu bridge near Osaka Castle. However, at the defeat of the shogunate's forces in the battle, these soldiers were among those who returned to their respective domains.

After the battle, Kawai went to Edo. Planning to amass enough strength to counter the pro-imperial forces, he purchased large numbers of firearms for Nagaoka troops. Moreover, being influenced by the Monroe Doctrine from the United States, Kawai began to advocate a stance of armed neutrality for the domain from both the shogunate and imperial forces.

When the imperial government-general of Hokuriku ordered Nagaoka to send troops and funds for their forces, Kawai ignored the command. This was seen as a problem, and when Edo Castle fell on May 4 of the same year, imperial troops immediately advanced towards northern Echigo province, part of which was controlled by the domain.

Soon after, Takakura Nagasachi, a court noble, was appointed to lead the imperial forces that were to pacify the Hokuriku region and subjugate Aizu Domain in nearby Mutsu province. With him, Kuroda Kiyotaka and Yamagata Aritomo were appointed staff officers. Upon gathering in Takada in Echigo, the army was divided into a land force and a naval force, both of which then advanced towards Nagaoka on May 13. The domain appointed Kawai as overseer of military affairs in response, and invited troops from Aizu and Kuwana domains, and the Shōhōtai to form what would become an allied army.

On June 29, Enoki Pass, which led to the west of Nagaoka, was taken by forces of the combined army, marking the first action in the campaign. A day after, a battle for the control of Mt. Asahi to the south ended in an allied victory. Tokiyama Naohachi, a samurai from Chōshū Domain, was killed in action in the fighting. However, Nagaoka Castle fell to imperial forces on July 8; it was later retaken by the allied army.

== Battle ==
On August 10, a little less than 300 Nagaoka soldiers of the Yūgekitai conducted a surprise attack on imperial forces stationed at Hatchōoki. Although the ambush was seen as a victory, 11 soldiers were killed in action. Sensing a counterattack, Kawai devised another strategy and on September 10, a month later, 17 platoons numbering about 680 soldiers were ferried across Hatchōoki in six hours and, upon arriving at the other side, staged a surprise attack at Nagaoka Castle. The soldiers immediately attacked, reaching so far as the land around the fortifications, repelling imperial forces led by Yamagata Aritomo, and recaptured the castle.

However, imperial troops fought back, resulting in 62 Nagaoka soldiers dead. Kawai was wounded in the fighting; he was shot, rendering him unable to walk. The attack itself was not enough for the imperial forces to retake the castle, but the tables were turned against Nagaoka when nearby Shibata Domain switched allegiance to the new government, allowing the imperial army to lay siege to Nagaoka Castle once again. On September 15, the castle once again surrendered to imperial forces. Nagaoka soldiers fought valiantly, but ended up losing 58 more people in the battle. The remaining defenders accompanied the wounded Kawai, who was carried on a stretcher, as they fled to Aizu. Crossing Hachijūrigoe pass, they reached Aizu lands on September 20.

At Aizu, Kawai received treatment from Dr. Matsumoto Ryōjun for his wounds, but he later succumbed to his wounds on October 1.
