= Shōkasonjuku Academy =

Historic academy in Yamaguchi, Japan

Coordinates: 34°24′44″N 131°25′02″E

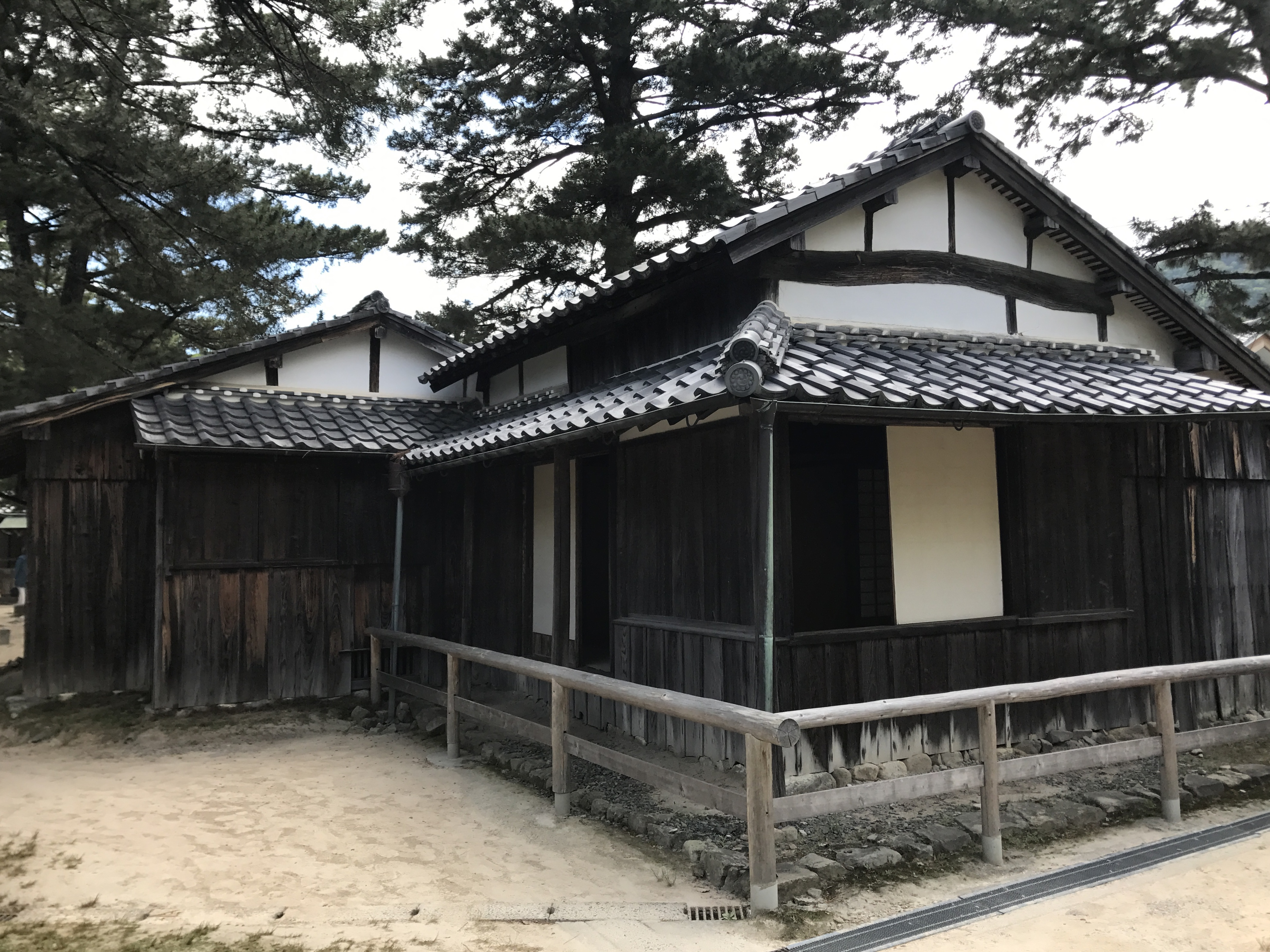
Shōkasonjuku Academy

Shōkasonjuku Academy (松下村塾, Shōkasonjuku; Japanese pronunciation: [ɕoː.ka.soꜜɲ.dʑɯ.kɯ]), is a small size academy also known as a national historic site of Japan. The location of Shōka Sonjuku is 1537-1 Chinto, Hagi city, Yamaguchi.

Shōka Sonjuku is inside a shrine: Shōin Jinja (also Shōin Shrine). Shōin Shrine was built for Yoshida Shōin, to memorialize the leading figure of the Meiji Restoration. The traditional wooden building was one of the most crucial origins of political and philosophical ideas, specifically in manners of Western technology and critical industrialization of Japan. The area of Shōka Sonjuku is 50 m^{2} (540 sq ft). It consists of an 8-mat classroom, 10-mat prep room and a 3.3 m^{2} (36 sq ft) earthen floor. The common view of Shōka Sonjuku is that this sonjuku (a place for academy) was established by Yoshida Shōin (one of the most unique intellectuals and philosopher of wang yangming school of mind in Japan). The actual origin of this sonjuku was when Shōin’s uncle Tamaki Bunnoshin used his own residence to establish a shijuku (independent private school of the Tokugawa system). Shōka Sonjuku fostered many outstanding figures, who contributed to the Meiji Restoration. It closed in 1892 and the guideline of the sonjuku was "support the Mikado (the emperor of Japan) and resist the imperialism from other countries".

== History ==
=== The Origin Of Shōka Sonjuku ===
From the common views, Shōka Sonjuku was established by Yoshida Shōin. There was a letter from Yoshida Shōin to Kusaka Genzui written in 1856. This letter briefly talks about Yoshida Shōin prepared the students of the Sonjuku as a political cadre. Yoshida Shōin was a teacher of this Sonjuku and he influenced this Sonjuku, even that era of Japan profoundly. From the source "Yoshida Shoin (1830-1859) and the Shoka Sonjuku", there were actually three phases of the Sonjuku. Properly, the actual origin of the Sonjuku was by Tamaki Bunnoshin.

=== Three phases of Shōka Sonjuku ===
The first phase was Shōka Sonjuku of Tamaki & Kubo. The second phase was Shōin's Sonjuku. The third phase was "The Radicalization of the Sonjuku".

In 1842, Yoshida Shōin's uncle Tamaki Bunnoshin used his own residence as a shijuku. Later the shijuku was commonly called Shōka Sonjuku or Matsushita Sonjuku. At the age of 12, Yoshida Shōin was registered as a pupil, together with his two elder brothers. Later, Shōin started his travels to explore his country. Yoshida Shōin was back to Shōka Sonjuku and began teaching again after January 1856. Until this point, it was still phase one. Because Shōin was a staff only and his uncle still took control of Shōka Sonjuku. When Shōin became the principal-administrator of Shōka Sonjuku, it entered to phase two. The scale of the sonjuku increased apparently. Some seminars Shōin held had the attendance above 200 per week. After Shōin's death, it entered phase three.

== Yoshida Shōin ==
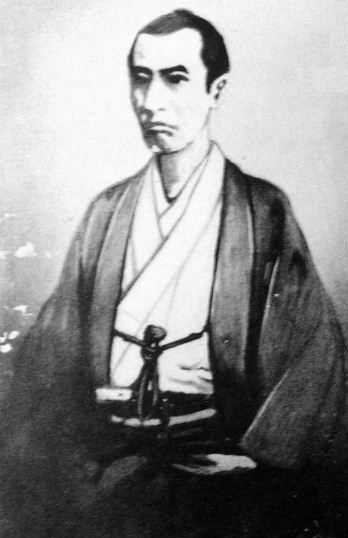

Yoshida Shōin (1830–1859), a teacher, scholar and patriot in Japan. He contributed to the Meiji Restoration through his own way, influenced the country by spreading knowledge. Yoshida Shōin had a strong family background. He was in the Choushu Domain, which was influential during the Sengoku period. His background gave him the chances to touch the western sciences and technologies and became what he interested in when he was young.

Before 1850s, Japan was isolated in peace for about 250 years. After the fleet of Matthew Perry arrived in Japan in 1853, the situation changed. The country was brought into chaos. Numerous shishis and scholars emerged and Yoshida Shōin was one of the most important scholars in the late Edo period. His students, such as Itō Hirobumi, Takasugi Shinsaku, passed on his thoughts and spirits to Meiji Restoration and contributed to it.

When Shōin was young, he studied Yagama school and this experience influenced him significantly. The Yagama school was found by a vital Japanese scholar Yamaga Soto during the early years of the Edo period. The essential views of Yagama school were that people should pay more attention to Samurai class and the Bushido, the status of the country, and the emperor. In the 17th century, many scholars raised the question about Samurai: What role do they play in this peaceful age? As the answer of Yagama: devote themselves to their duty and giving loyalty to their owners. Yoshida Shōin was influenced by these views and contacted to Buddhism as a part of the study.

In 1856, Yoshida Shōin was back to his academy, Shōka Sonjuku and started his teaching at Shōka Sonjuku. From the lecture notes of Yoshida Shōin, Shōka Sonjuku Ki, the essential purports were "Kun-Shin no gi, or the Duty of the lord and subjects, and Ka-I no Ben, or the discrimination of civilized and barbarian", combining with some views he was taught in Yamaga school.

In 1859 November 21, Yoshida Shōin was executed. Yoshida Shōin was sent to prison due to plot the rebellion.

In a ballad Yoshida composed:

"This is the journey

From which probably

For me there shall be no return.

Wholly drenched

Is the pine tree of tears."

== Shōin Jinja and Yoshida Shōin ==
Shōin Jinja is a holy place committed to the instructor Yoshida Shōin (1830–1859) and based on the grounds were Shōin educated, lived, and was detained for quite a while under house capture. Yoshida Shōin was conceived in Hagi, a palace town situated in Chōshū Domain, present-day Yamaguchi Prefecture. At the ready age of 11 years of age, he was instructing the daimyo Mori Takachika military expressions and scholastics. He turned out to be notable all through his space, just as others, as a brilliant personality and teacher at a youthful age.

The fix of the Matsushita tuition-based school in a town was performed in August 1890, 31 years after the fact by the hands, for example, individuals from Matsushita non-public school in a town after I named the cherished god of the Shoin Shinto hallowed place, Yoshida quadrature individual (after Shoin educator) and was done junsetsu. The guardians' place of the Shoin educator, the little sanctuary of the godown style to revere the soul of a dead individual of Mr. Shoin by hand of the general population of the individual of cedar were raised at that point. This is the harbinger of the Shoin Shinto place of worship.

Yoshida's desire for information was so vast that he endeavored to load up outside boats and depart Japan to examine western sciences and military strategies. This was considered a very risky journey at the time, as leaving Japan without consent was carefully prohibited. His celebrated endeavor to board one of the Black Ships under the order of American Commodore Matthew Perry ended up bringing his capture. He was brought back to shogun Tokugawa Iemochi and tossed behind bars.

At that time, the Shōgun was attempting to arrange amicable exchange terms with the western powers that had landed on Japanese shores. Shōin and his supporters demonstrated to be inconvenient for the shogunate as they were defenders of "Sonno Joi" (Revere the Emperor and Expel the Barbarians) contrary to the shogunate, or bakufu. As a result of his extraordinary conflict with the shogun's counsel Ii Naosuke, Shoin plotted an assassination on the counselor's life. It fizzled, and the contention between bakufu arrangement and the renegade revitalizing cry lead to the Ansei Purge (1858–1860) which at last brought about the passing of Yoshida Shōin. On November 21, 1859, he was decapitated for his wrongdoings of plotting to kill Ii Naosuke and sorting out rebellions all through Japan.

The grounds are home to Shōin Jinja, an exhibition hall, Shōka Sonjuku (the school where he showed a large number of Japan's future legends), and the house he went through quite a long while under house capture in. It is astounding to observe the minor school wherein Shōin showed a significant number of the most brilliant personalities to rise up out of Choshu. While the curios on the grounds are considered more established, the place of worship was finished in 1955. Since its fruition, numerous understudies have come to Shōin Jinja to appeal to God for decent evaluations and fortune with upcoming tests. A portion of the samurai understudies who went to his lessons at Shōka Sonjuku were Takasugi Shinsaku, Ito Hirobumi (Japan's first head administrator), Yamagata Aritomo, Kido Takayoshi, and Genzui Kusaka, all dynamic amid Japan's progress from the shogunate to the Meiji Restoration.

== Famous students ==
Itō Hirobumi (1841–1909), the first Prime Minister of Japan, played an influential role in the Meiji Restoration. He helped draft the Meiji constitution (1889) and brought about the establishment of a bicameral national Diet (1890). He was made a marquess in 1884 and a duke (or prince) in 1907. At the age of 68, he was assassinated in China.

Yamagata Aritomo (1838–1922), twice Prime Minister of Japan, as known as the father of Japanese militarism. Japanese soldier and statesman who exerted a strong influence in Japan’s emergence as a formidable military power at the beginning of the 20th century. He was the first prime minister under the parliamentary regime, serving in 1889–91 and 1898–1900.

Takasugi Shinsaku (1839–1867), a samurai who was pivotal to the Meiji Restoration. He restructured the military forces of Chōshū and enabled them to defeat the armies of the Tokugawa Shogun. This war led to the Meiji Restoration and brought down the old government.

A list of names of the students registered in Shōka Sonjuku can be found in the book Yoshida Shōin (1830–1859) and the Shōka Sonjuku by Maida Stelmar Coaldrake M.A. (Tas.).

== See also ==
- Asteroid 208499 Shokasonjuku, named for the academy
