= Mōri Takachika =

Japanese feudal lords (1819–1871)

- 毛利 敬親
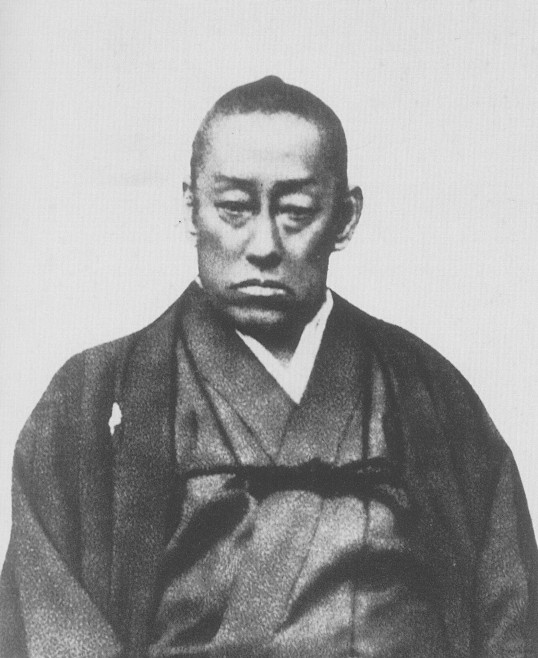
- Born: March 5, 1819
- Died: May 17, 1871 (aged 52)
- Other name: Mōri Yoshichika
- Children: Mōri Motonori
- Military career
- Allegiance: Chōshū Domain; Imperial Court
- Conflicts: Kinmon incident Boshin War

Posthumous portrait by Harada Naojirō

Mōri Takachika (毛利 敬親; March 5, 1819 – May 17, 1871) was the 13th daimyo of Chōshū Domain. His domain was a traditional enemy of the Tokugawa shogunate, and he became a key player in its downfall during the Bakumatsu period. He was also the first daimyo to return his lands to the Emperor during the abolition of the han system. He was later allowed to use a character from the name of shōgun Tokugawa Ieyoshi and changed his name to Yoshichika (慶親).

== Life ==
He was born on March 5, 1819, the first son of Fukubara Fusamasa (later known as Mōri Narimoto) and a concubine from the Harada clan. His father later became the 11th daimyo of Chōshū Domain. His father was the first son of Mōri Chikaaki, but at the time of Takachika's birth, his father was the adopted son of Fukubara Fusazumi, the head of the Fukubara clan, one of the eight karō families of the domain. On August 28, 1819, his father returned to the Mōri main family, and on September 10, he was adopted by Mōri Narihiro and changed his name to Narimoto, later becoming the next daimyo of the domain.

He employed Murata Seifū, Tsuboi Kuemon and Sufu Masanosuke as reformers of the economy and administration in his domain.

Events during his reign include the Bombardment of Shimonoseki, the Ikedaya Incident, the Kinmon incident, the First Chōshū expedition and Second Chōshū expedition, the Satchō Alliance and the Boshin War.

He was the first daimyo to return his lands to the Emperor during the abolition of the han system.

== See also ==
- Meirinkan
