= Germany–Japan relations =

- Germany: Japan

Diplomatic mission
- Embassy of Germany, Tokyo: Embassy of Japan, Berlin

Envoy
- Ambassador Petra Sigmund: Ambassador Hidenao Yanagi

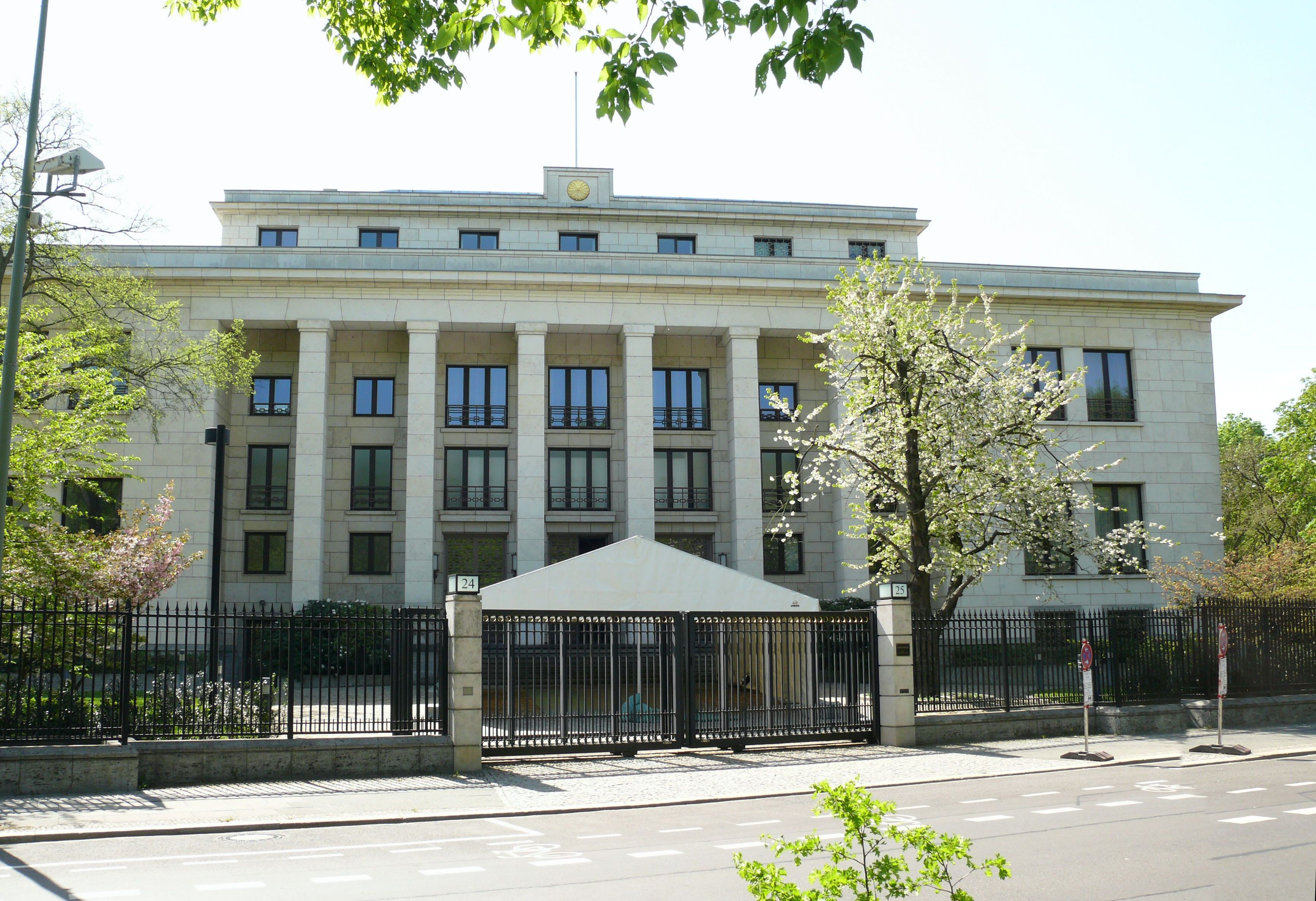
Re-constructed in the 1990s, the Japanese embassy in Berlin's Hiroshima Street was originally built from 1938 to 1942, and thus has been a symbol for German–Japanese relations since that time.

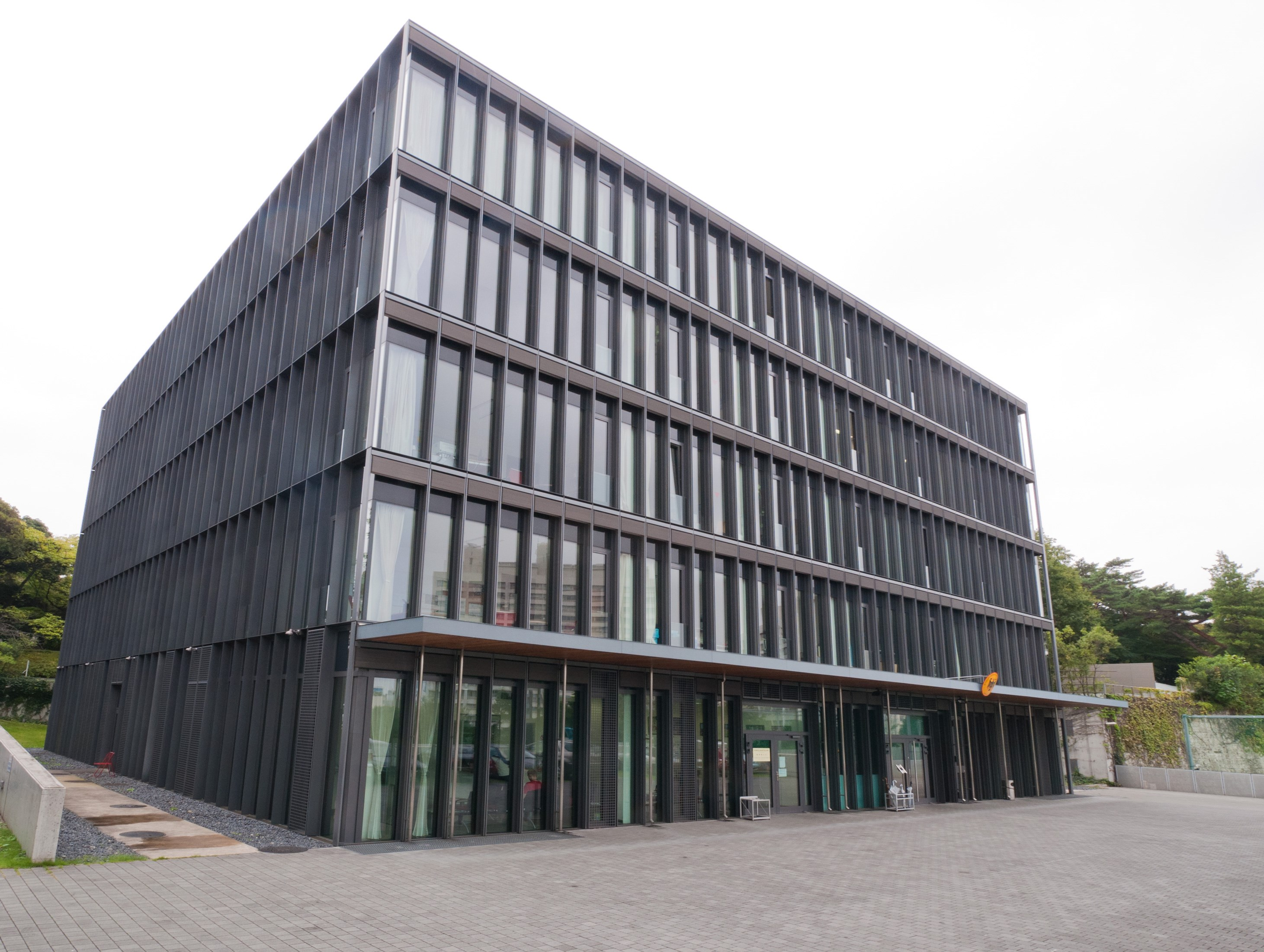
Embassy of Germany in Japan

Germany–Japan relations (German: Deutsch-japanische Beziehungen; Japanese: 日独関係, romanized: Nichidokukankei) are the current and historical relations between the Federal Republic of Germany and Japan. As of 2025, Germany and Japan are world's 3rd and 4th largest economies by nominal GDP. They maintain extensive political, cultural, scientific, militaristic and economic cooperation. Japan also has close relations with the European Union, of which Germany is the most populous member.

Japan had limited contact with Germans during its isolationist sakoku period, via the Dutch trading port of Dejima. During the bakumatsu opening period, the Kingdom of Prussia established diplomatic relations in 1860 with the Eulenburg expedition. Japan modernized rapidly after the Meiji Restoration of 1868, often using German models through intense intellectual and cultural exchange. After aligning with Britain in 1902, the Empire of Japan declared war on the German Empire in 1914, one month into World War I. Japan fought one major battle in the war's Asia-Pacific theatre, the Siege of Tsingtao. It acquired from Germany its Kiautschou Bay Leased Territory leading to the Shandong Problem, as well as the South Seas Mandate.

In the 1930s, both countries adopted aggressive ultranationalist attitudes toward their respective regions, Nazism and Kokkashugi, leading to a rapprochement. The Anti-Comintern Pact between the countries grew into the political and military alliance known as the Axis powers, to which Fascist Italy and other countries later acceded. The countries also developed an industrial cooperation, and initially used the Trans-Siberian Railway. During World War II, however, due to the German invasion of the Soviet Union, Japan and Germany fought the largely separate Pacific War and European theatre, only exchanging cargo via the Yanagi and U-boat submarine missions. Germany surrendered in May 1945, three months before Japan.

After World War II, the Allies occupied Germany until 1949 and the US occupied Japan until 1952. Among worldwide growth, Germany experienced the Wirtschaftswunder ("economic miracle") and Japan later saw its own economic miracle. Bilateral relations, now focused on economic issues, were soon re-established. Both countries are members of economic organizations including the G7, G20, OECD, and World Trade Organization. They are also members of the G4 nations and the International Criminal Court. Among their scientific cooperation, both countries contribute to the ITER nuclear fusion program, and via the European Space Agency and JAXA.

According to a late 2023 Bertelsmann Foundation Poll, the Germans view Japan overwhelmingly positively, and regard that nation as less a competitor and more a partner. The Japanese views of Germany are positive as well, with 97% viewing Germany positively and only 3% viewing Germany negatively.

== History ==
=== First contacts and end of Japanese isolation (before 1871) ===
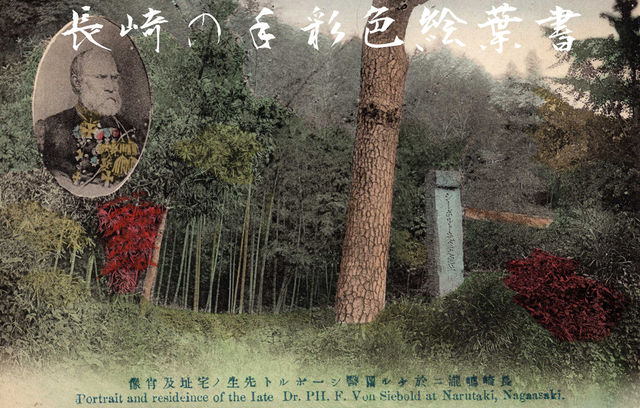
Philipp Franz Balthasar von Siebold contributed greatly to Europe's perception of Japan.

Relations between Japan and Germany date from the Tokugawa shogunate (1603–1868), when Germans in Dutch service arrived in Japan to work for the Dutch East India Company (VOC). The first well-documented cases are those of the physicians Engelbert Kaempfer (1651–1716) and Philipp Franz Balthasar von Siebold (1796–1866) in the 1690s and 1820s, respectively. Both accompanied the director of the Dutch trading post at Dejima on the obligatory voyage to Edo to pay tribute to the shōgun. Siebold became the author of Nippon, Archiv zur Beschreibung von Japan (Nippon, Archive for the Description of Japan), one of the most valuable sources of information on Japan well into the 20th century; since 1979, his achievements have been recognised with an annual German award in his honour, the Philipp Franz von Siebold-Preis, granted to Japanese scientists. Von Siebold's second visit to Japan (1859–1862) became a disaster because he tried to influence Dutch politics in Japan and attempted to obtain a permanent post as a diplomat in that country.

In 1854, the United States pressured Japan into the Convention of Kanagawa, which ended Japan's isolation. It was considered an "unequal treaty" by the Japanese public, since the US did not reciprocate most of Japan's concessions with similar privileges. In many cases, Japan was effectively forced into a system of extraterritoriality that provided for the subjugation of foreign residents to the laws of their own consular courts instead of the Japanese law system, open up ports for trade, and later even allow Christian missionaries to enter the country. Shortly after the end of Japan's seclusion, in the so-called Bakumatsu period, the first German traders arrived in Japan. In 1860, Count Friedrich Albrecht zu Eulenburg led the Eulenburg Expedition to Japan as ambassador from Prussia, a leading regional state in the German Confederation at that time. After four months of negotiations, another "unequal treaty", officially dedicated to amity and commerce, was signed in January 1861 between Prussia and Japan.

Despite being considered one of the numerous unjust negotiations pressed on Japan during that time, the Eulenburg Expedition, and both the short- and long-term consequences of the treaty of amity and commerce, are today honoured as the beginning of official Japanese-German relations. To commemorate its 150th anniversary, events were held in both Germany and Japan from autumn 2010 through autumn 2011 hoping "to 'raise the treasures of [their] common past' in order to build a bridge to the future."

==== Japanese diplomatic mission in Prussia ====
In 1863, three years after von Eulenburg's visit in Tokyo, a Shogunal legation arrived at the Prussian court of King Wilhelm I and was greeted with a grandiose ceremony in Berlin. After the treaty was signed, Max von Brandt became diplomatic representative in Japan – first representing Prussia, and after 1866 representing the North German Confederation, and by 1871 representing the newly established German Empire.

In 1868, the Tokugawa shogunate was overthrown and the Empire of Japan under Emperor Meiji was established. With the return of power to the Tennō dynasty, Japan demanded a revocation of the "unequal treaties" with the western powers and a civil war ensued. During the conflict, German weapons trader Henry Schnell counselled and supplied weapons to the daimyō of Nagaoka, a land lord loyal to the Shogunate. One year later, the war ended with the defeat of the Tokugawa and the renegotiation of the "unequal treaties".

=== Modernization of Japan and educational exchange (1871–1885) ===
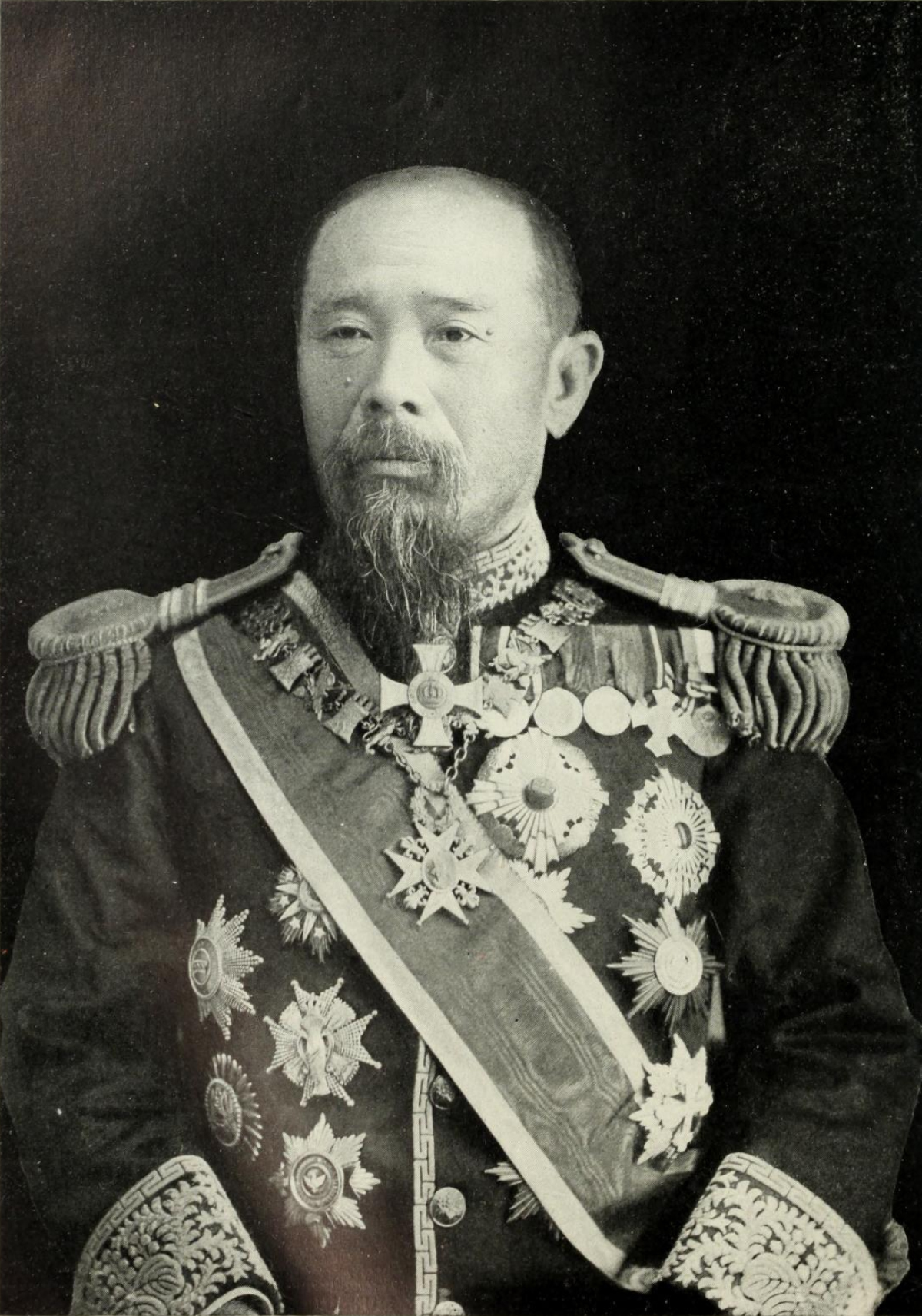
Japanese minister Itō Hirobumi studied European constitutions in Berlin and Vienna in 1882 as templates for a Japanese legal basis.

With the start of the Meiji period (1868–1912), many Germans came to work in Japan as advisors to the new government as so-called "oyatoi gaikokujin" (お雇い外国人, "hired foreigners") and contributed to the modernization of Japan, especially in the fields of medicine (Leopold Mueller, 1824–1894; Julius Scriba, 1848–1905; Erwin Bälz, 1849–1913), law (K. F. Hermann Roesler, 1834–1894; Albert Mosse, 1846–1925) and military affairs (K. W. Jacob Meckel, 1842–1906). Meckel had been invited by Japan's government in 1885 as an advisor to the Japanese general staff and as teacher at the Army War College. He spent three years in Japan, working with influential persons (including Katsura Tarō and Kawakami Soroku), thereby decisively contributing to the modernization of the Imperial Japanese Army. Meckel left behind a loyal group of Japanese admirers, who, after his death, had a bronze statue of him erected in front of his former army college in Tokyo. Overall, the Imperial Japanese Army intensively oriented its organization along Prusso-German lines when building a modern fighting force during the 1880s.

In 1889, the Constitution of the Empire of Japan was promulgated, greatly influenced by German legal scholars Rudolf von Gneist and Lorenz von Stein, whom the Meiji oligarch and future Prime Minister Itō Hirobumi (1841–1909) visited in Berlin and Vienna in 1882. At the request of the German government, Albert Mosse also met with Hirobumi and his group of government officials and scholars and gave a series of lectures on constitutional law, which helped to convince Hirobumi that the Prussian-style monarchical constitution was best-suited for Japan. In 1886, Mosse was invited to Japan on a three-year contract as "hired foreigner" to the Japanese government to assist Hirobumi and Inoue Kowashi in drafting the Meiji Constitution. He later worked on other important legal drafts, international agreements, and contracts and served as a cabinet advisor in the Home Ministry, assisting Prime Minister Yamagata Aritomo in establishing the draft laws and systems for local government. Dozens of Japanese students and military officers also went to Germany in the late 19th century, to study the German military system and receive military training at German army educational facilities and within the ranks of the German, mostly the Prussian army. For example, later famous writer Mori Rintarô (Mori Ōgai), who originally was an army doctor, received tutoring in the German language between 1872 and 1874, which was the primary language for medical education at the time. From 1884 to 1888, Ōgai visited Germany and developed an interest in European literature producing the first translations of the works of Goethe, Schiller, and Gerhart Hauptmann.

=== Cooling of relations and World War I (1885–1920) ===
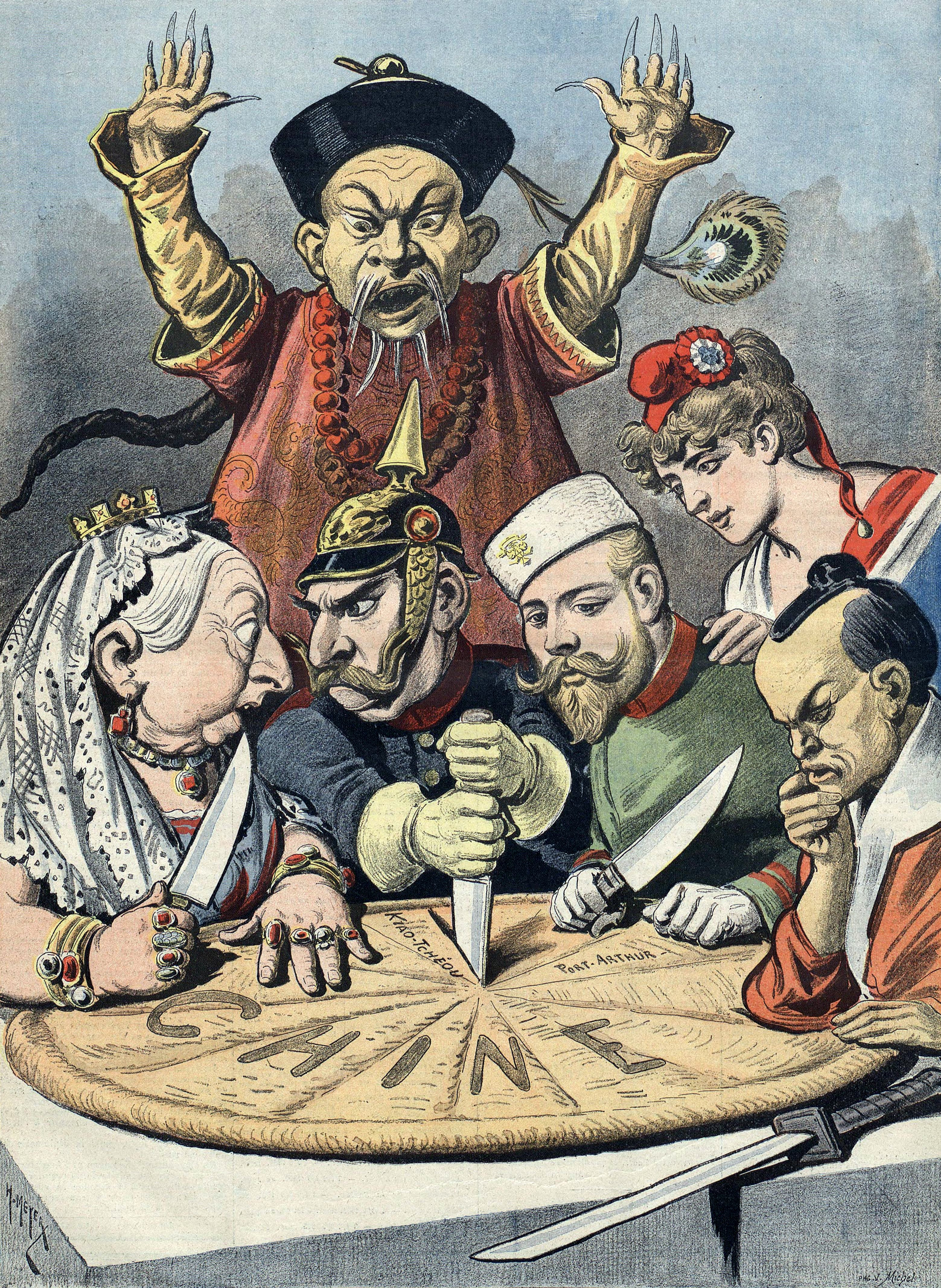
A French political cartoon from 1898 depicting the imperial powers, including Germany and Japan, dividing the "Chinese cake" among them.

At the end of the 19th century, Japanese–German relations cooled due to Germany's, and in general Europe's, imperialist aspirations in East Asia. After the conclusion of the First Sino-Japanese War in April 1895, the Treaty of Shimonoseki was signed, which included several territorial cessions from China to Japan, most importantly Taiwan and the eastern portion of the bay of the Liaodong Peninsula including Port Arthur. However, Russia, France and Germany grew wary of an ever-expanding Japanese sphere of influence and wanted to take advantage of China's bad situation by expanding their own colonial possessions instead. The frictions culminated in the so-called "Triple Intervention" on 23 April 1895, when the three powers "urged" Japan to refrain from acquiring its awarded possessions on the Liaodong Peninsula.

Another stress test for German–Japanese relations was the Russo-Japanese War of 1904/05, during which Germany strongly supported Russia. This circumstance triggered the Japanese foreign ministry to proclaim that any ship delivering coal to Russian vessels within the war zone would be sunk. After the Russo-Japanese War, Germany insisted on reciprocity in the exchange of military officers and students, and in the following years, several German military officers were sent to Japan to study the Japanese military, which, after its victory over the tsarist army became a promising organization to study. However, Japan's growing power and influence also caused increased distrust on the German side.

The onset of the First World War in Europe eventually showed how far German–Japanese relations had truly deteriorated. On 7 August 1914, only three days after Britain declared war on the German Empire, the Japanese government received an official request from the British government for assistance in destroying the German raiders of the Kaiserliche Marine in and around Chinese waters. Japan, eager to reduce the presence of European colonial powers in South-East Asia, especially on China's coast, sent Germany an ultimatum on 14 August 1914, which was left unanswered. Japan then formally declared war on Germany on 23 August 1914 thereby entering the First World War as an ally of Britain, France and Russia to seize the German-held Caroline, Marshall, and Mariana Islands in the Pacific.

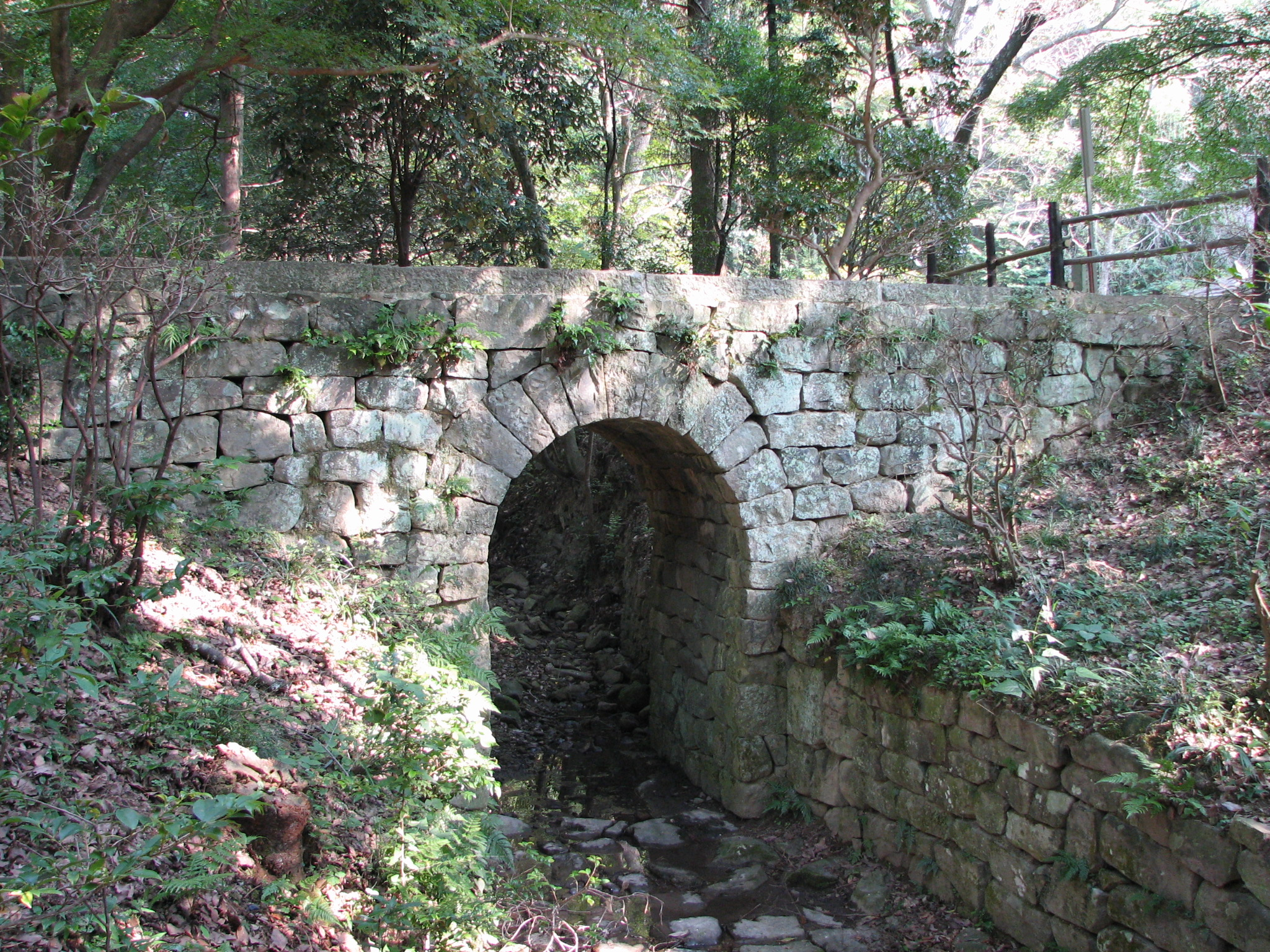
German Bridge, built by the prisoners of Bandō POW camp during their captivity

The only major battle that took place between Japan and Germany was the siege of the German-controlled Chinese port of Tsingtao in Kiautschou Bay. The German forces held out from August until November 1914, under a total Japanese/British blockade, sustained artillery barrages and manpower odds of 6:1 – a fact that gave a morale boost during the siege as well as later in defeat. After Japanese troops stormed the city, the German dead were buried at Tsingtao and the remaining troops were transported to Japan where they were treated with respect at places like the Bandō Prisoner of War camp. In 1919, when Germany formally signed the Treaty of Versailles, all prisoners of war were set free and most returned to Europe.

Japan was a signatory of the Treaty of Versailles, which stipulated harsh repercussions for Germany. In the Pacific, Japan gained Germany's islands north of the equator (the Marshall Islands, the Carolines, the Marianas, the Palau Islands) and Kiautschou/Tsingtao in China. Article 156 of the Treaty also transferred German concessions in Shandong to Japan rather than returning sovereign authority to the Republic of China, an issue soon to be known as Shandong Problem. Chinese outrage over this provision led to demonstrations, and a cultural movement known as the May Fourth Movement influenced China not to sign the treaty. China declared the end of its war against Germany in September 1919 and signed a separate treaty with Germany in 1921. This fact greatly contributed to Germany relying on China, and not Japan, as its strategic partner in East Asia for the coming years.

=== Rapprochement, Axis and World War II (1920–1945) ===
==== Reestablishment of relations and Sino-Japanese dilemma ====
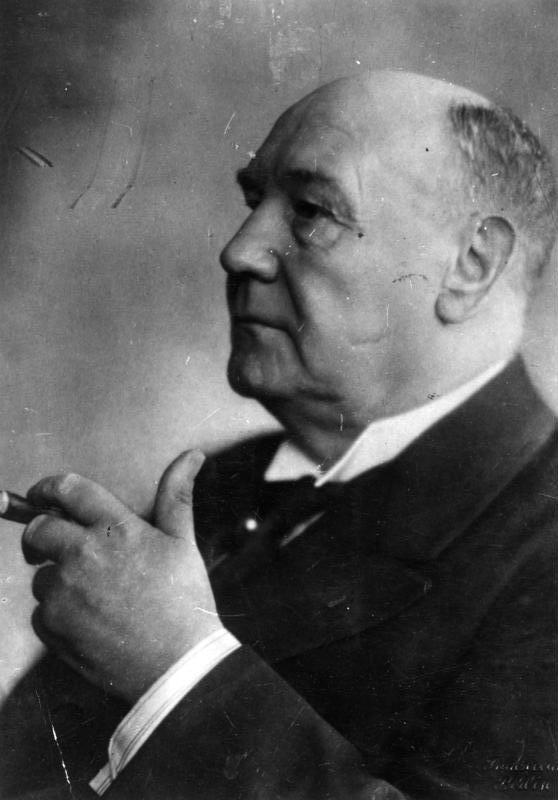
As German ambassador in Tokyo from 1920 to 1928, Wilhelm Solf initiated the re-establishment of good German–Japanese relations.

After Germany had to cede most of its Pacific and Asian possessions to Japan and with an intensifying Sino-German cooperation, relations between Berlin and Tokyo were nearly dead. Under the initiative of Wilhelm Solf, who served as German ambassador to Japan from 1920 to 1928, cultural exchange was strengthened again. A cultural agreement was signed in 1926 that led to the re-establishment of the "German-Japanese Society" (1926), the founding of the "Japan Institute" in Berlin (1926), the establishment of the "Japanese-German Cultural Society" in Tokyo (1927), and later also the incorporation of the "Japanese-German Research Institute" in Kyoto (1934). Both France and Germany were very attractive for Japanese wanting to study abroad, as both countries kept their currencies undervalued in the 1920s. As German universities were considered superior to their French counterparts, 80% of Japanese students going abroad thus chose Germany. In fact, many of the men who emerged as leaders of the Pan-Asia movement in Japan in the 1930s studied at German universities in the 1920s, which led the Japanese historian Hotta Eri to note there was a strong German influence on the discourse of Japanese Pan-Asianism.

On 30 January 1933, the Nazi Party under Adolf Hitler assumed power in Germany, abolishing the democratic system of the Weimar Republic within the first two months of its reign. This political turning point proved to be far-reaching for the relations between Germany and Japan. In spring and again in fall of 1933, German-Japanese relations were damaged, when the Sturmabteilung (SA), a para-military branch of the Nazi Party, took to beating up Asians studying at German universities. Japanese and Chinese officials complained about "Yellow Peril" propaganda in German newspapers, reports of German plans to ban interracial relationships, and ongoing violence against Asian students all over the country. In October 1933, the Japanese government warned its nationals not to visit Germany, saying the country was unsafe for Asians to be in, and in November 1933, the Chinese government issued a similar warning to its citizens. German foreign minister and head of the Auswärtiges Amt Konstantin von Neurath persuaded Hitler to stop the SA violence against Asians, pointing out that Chinese head of state Chiang Kai-shek was threatening to expel the German military mission and replace it with a French one. In regards to Japan, Neurath noted it was advantageous to have so many scions of the Japanese elite studying at German universities, arguing that it was an incalculable advantage to Germany in the long run. At this time, however, Germany had much closer relations with China, which purchased an increasing amount of German arms and whose National Revolutionary Army received training by a German military mission. Not only did this happen against Japanese objections, but it also caused the original complaints from China, and not those from Japan, to eventually motivate Berlin's change of attitude.

In late 1933-early 1934, another strain was placed on German-Japanese relations when the new German ambassador to Japan and outspoken proponent of German-Japanese partnership, Herbert von Dirksen, backed the appointment of Ferdinand Heye, a member of the Nazi Party and disreputable businessman, the Special German Trade Commissioner for Japan's puppet state Manchukuo in northern China. Berlin's interaction with Manchukuo was delicate, as its official diplomatic recognition by Germany was sought after by Japan, but would greatly damage Sino-German relations. Hitler's interest to keep China as a partner for the time being became obvious, when he disavowed Heye, who had falsely promised German recognition of Manchukuo in order to monopolize German trading in the region under his name. In the summer of 1935, Joachim von Ribbentrop, a German foreign policy official operating independently from the Auswärtiges Amt, together with his friend, the Japanese military attaché to Germany, General Hiroshi Ōshima, planned to relieve Germany of its China-or-Japan-dilemma by promoting an anti-Communist alliance that would unite all three countries together. However, the Auswärtiges Amt under Konstantin von Neurath vetoed this approach, as it deemed trade relations with China too important to be risked by a pact that Chiang Kai-shek was unlikely to join.

Around the same time, von Rippentrop negotiated the Anglo-German Naval Agreement, which caused a temporary deterioration of German-Japanese relations when it was signed in June 1935. At the time, many Japanese politicians, including Admiral Isoroku Yamamoto (who was an outspoken critic of an alliance with Nazi Germany), were shocked by what was seen as Germany attempting to create an alliance with Great Britain. Nevertheless, the leaders of the military clique then in control in Tokyo concluded that it was a ruse designed to buy the Germans time to match the Royal Navy. After all, Hitler had already laid down his plans in Mein Kampf, in which he identified Britain as a potential ally but also defined Japan as a target of "international Jewry", and thus a nation which Germany could potentially form an alliance with:

It was not in the interests of Great Britain to have Germany annihilated, but primarily a Jewish interest. And to-day the destruction of Japan would serve British political interests less than it would serve the far-reaching intentions of those who are leading the movement that hopes to establish a Jewish world-empire.

— Adolf Hitler, Mein Kampf (volume 1)

==== Consolidation of cooperation ====
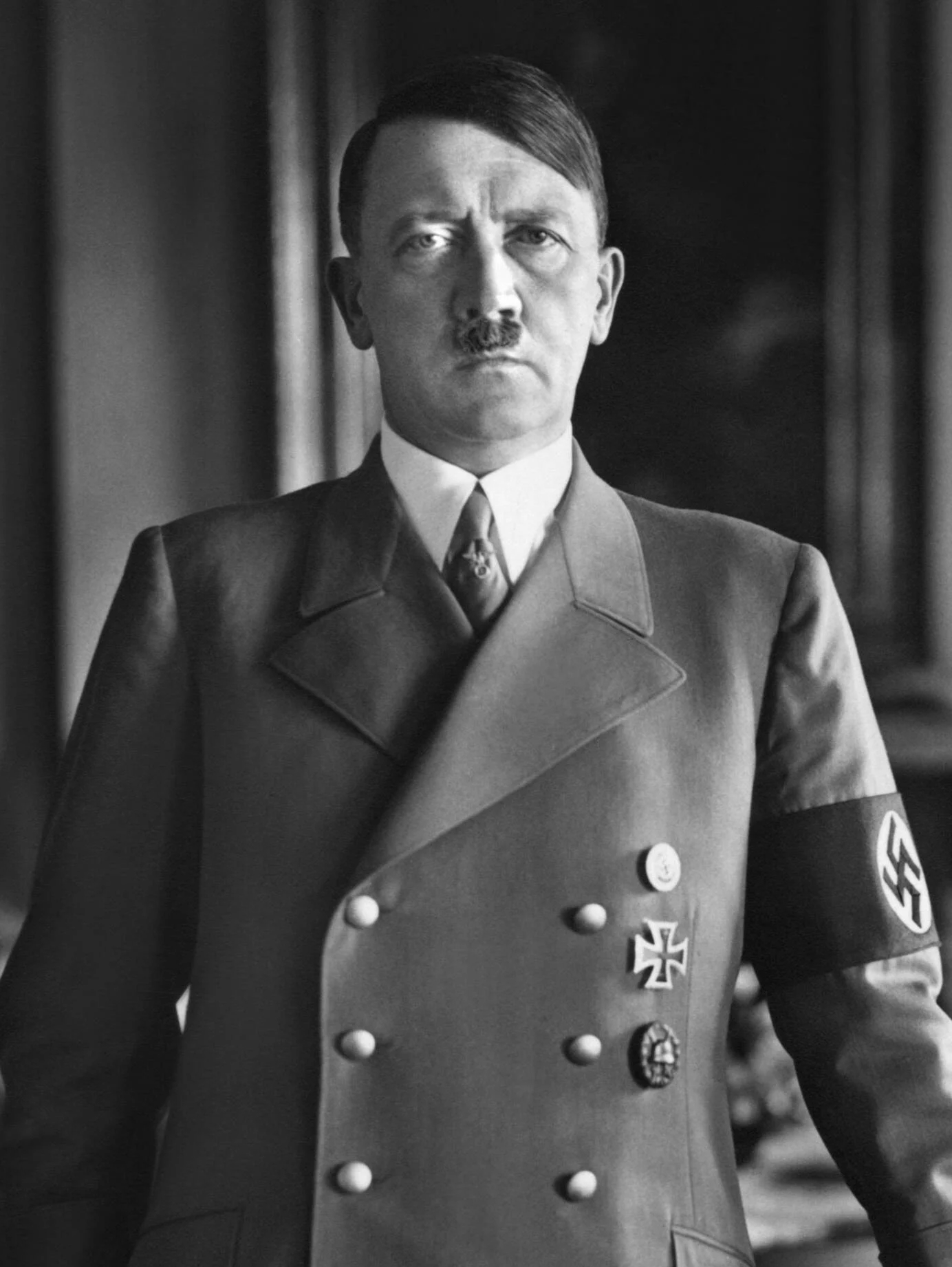
Adolf Hitler

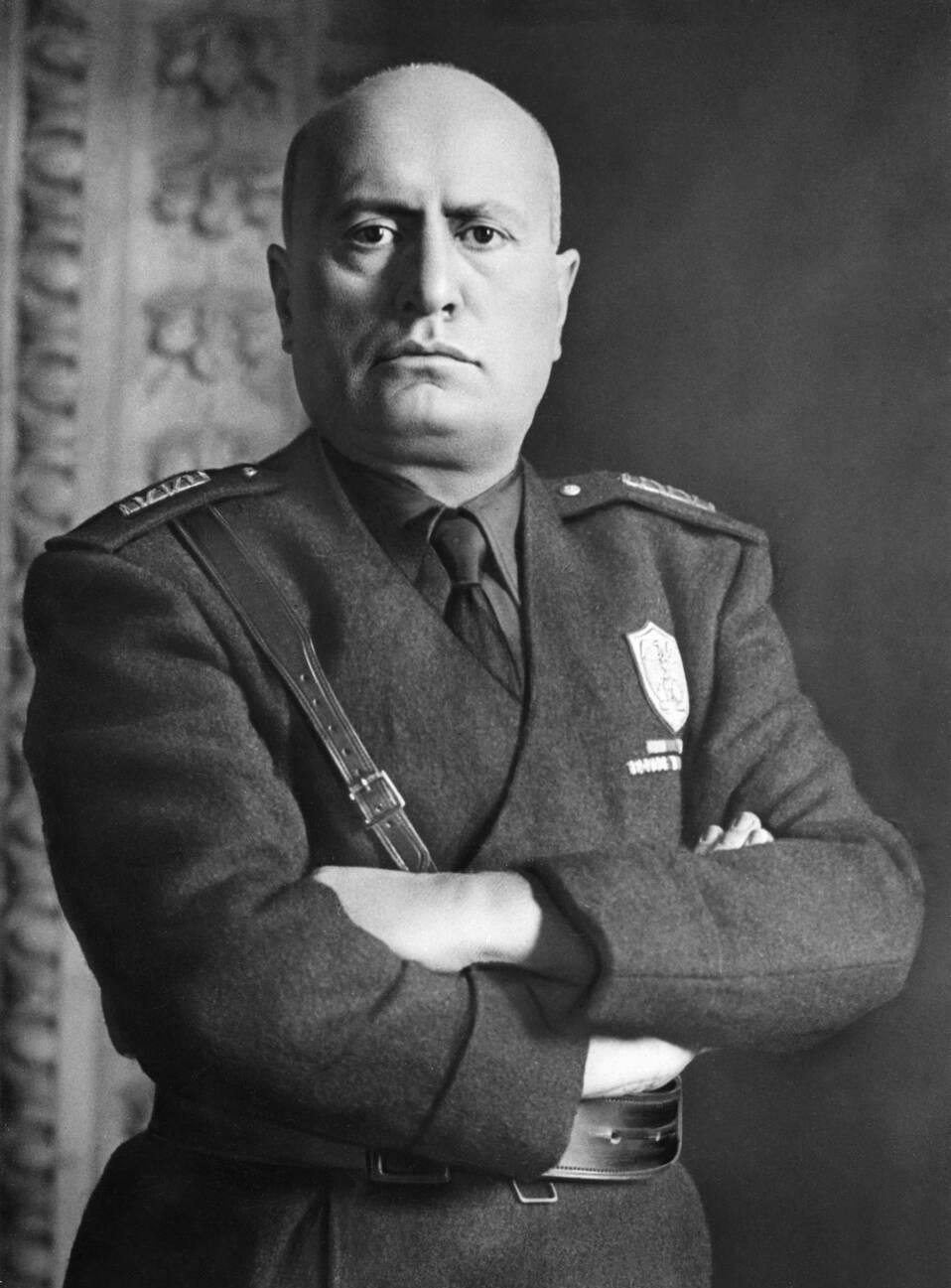
Benito Mussolini

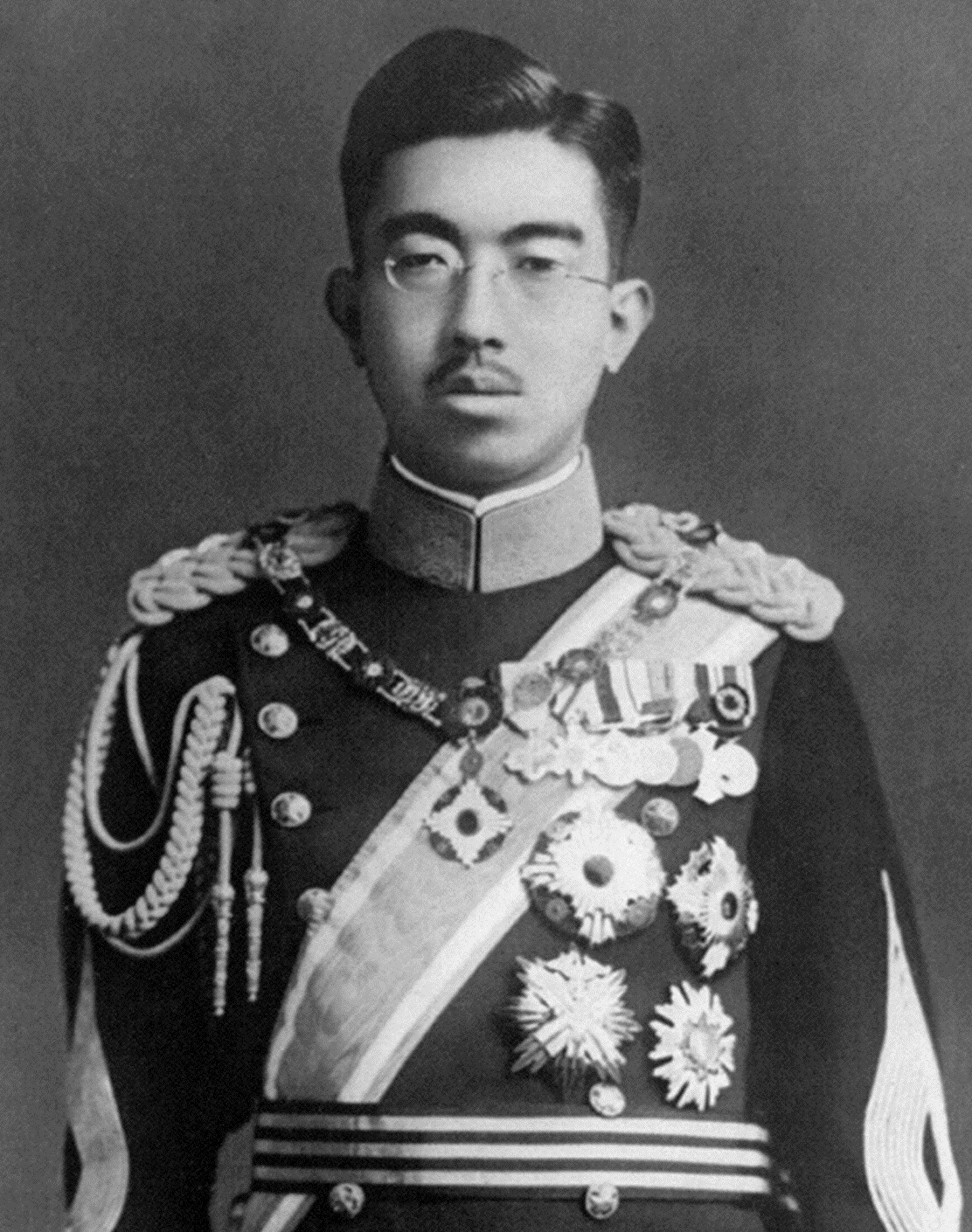
Hirohito

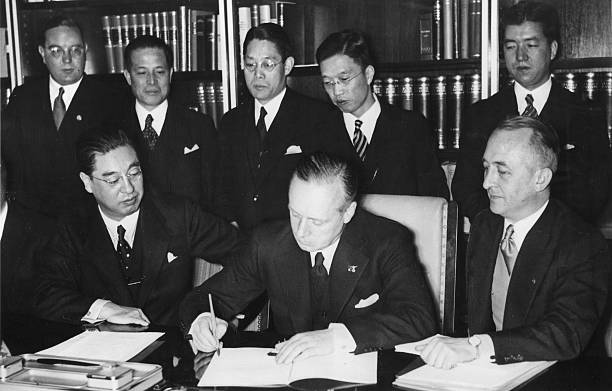
Japanese ambassador Kintomo Mushakoji and foreign minister of Nazi Germany Joachim von Ribbentrop sign the Anti-Comintern Pact in 1936.

Tokyo's military leaders proceeded to devise plans assuring the Empire's supply with resources by eventually creating a "Greater East Asia Co-Prosperity Sphere". In general, further expansion was envisioned – either northwards, attacking the Soviet Union, a plan which was called Hokushin-ron, or by seizing French, Dutch and/or British colonies to the south, a concept dubbed Nanshin-ron. Hitler, on the other hand, never desisted from his plan to conquer new territories in Eastern Europe for Lebensraum; thus, conflicts with Poland and later with the Soviet Union seemed inevitable.

The first legal consolidation of German-Japanese mutual interests occurred in 1936, when the two countries signed the Anti-Comintern Pact, which was directed against the Communist International (Comintern) in general and the Soviet Union in particular. After the signing, Nazi Germany's government also included the Japanese people in their concept of "honorary Aryans". Yasuhito, Prince Chichibu then attended the 1937 Nuremberg Rally in Germany and met Adolf Hitler, with whom he tried to boost personal relations. Fascist Italy, led by Benito Mussolini joined the Anti-Comintern Pact the same year, thereby taking the first steps towards the formation of the so-called Axis between Rome, Berlin, and Tokyo.

Originally, Germany had a very close relationship with the Chinese nationalist government, even providing military aid and assistance to the Republic of China. Relations soured after the outbreak of the Second Sino-Japanese War on 7 July 1937, and when China shortly thereafter concluded the Sino-Soviet Non-Aggression Pact with the Soviet Union. Notwithstanding the superior Sino-German economic relationship, Hitler concluded that Japan would be a more reliable geostrategic partner and chose to end his alliance with the Chinese as the price of gaining an alignment with the more modern and militarily powerful Japan. In a May 1938 address to the Reichstag, Hitler announced German recognition of Japan's puppet state Manchukuo and renounced the German claims to the former colonies in the Pacific now held by the Japanese Empire. Hitler ordered the end of arm shipments to China, as well as the recall of all German officers attached to the Chinese Army. Despite this move, however, Hitler retained his general perception of neither the Japanese nor the Chinese civilizations being inferior to the German one.

The relations between Japan and Germany continued to grow closer during the late 1930s and several cultural exchanges took place, albeit motivated by political and propaganda reasons. A focus was put on youth exchanges, and numerous mutual visits were conducted; for instance, in late 1938, the ship Gneisenau carried a delegation of 30 members of the Hitler Youth to Tokyo for a study visit. In 1938, representative measures for embracing the German-Japanese partnership were sought and the construction of a new Japanese embassy building in Berlin was started. After the preceding embassy had to give way to Hitler's and Albert Speer's plans of re-modeling Berlin to the world capital city of Germania, a new and more pompous building was erected in a newly established diplomatic district next to the Tiergarten. It was conceived by Ludwig Moshamer under the supervision of Speer and was placed opposite the Italian embassy, thereby bestowing an architectural emphasis on the Rome-Berlin-Tokyo axis.

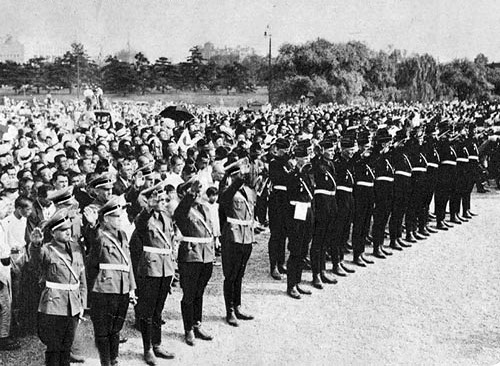
Hitlerjugend in Nijūbashi Edo Castle holding a symbolic greeting ceremony for Emperor Shōwa

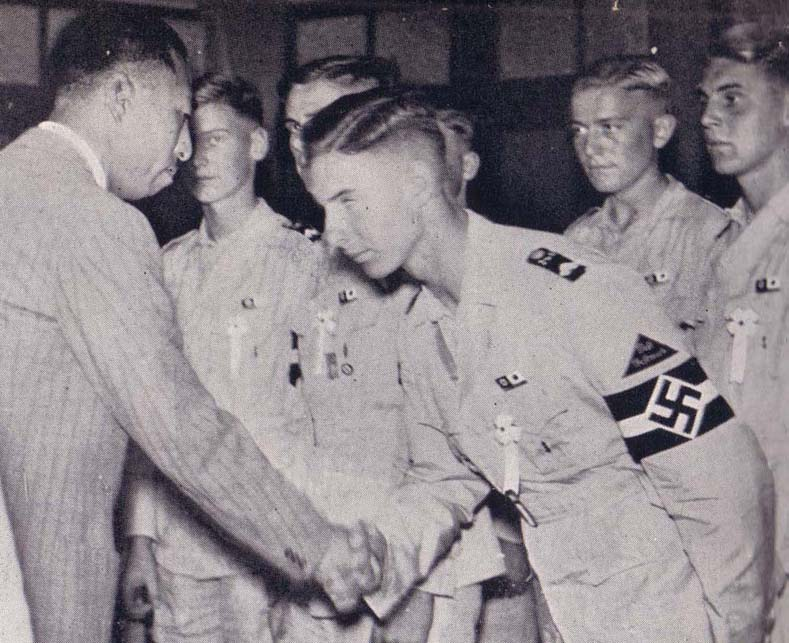
The Hitlerjugend meeting with Japanese leader Prince Fumimaro Konoe, August 1938

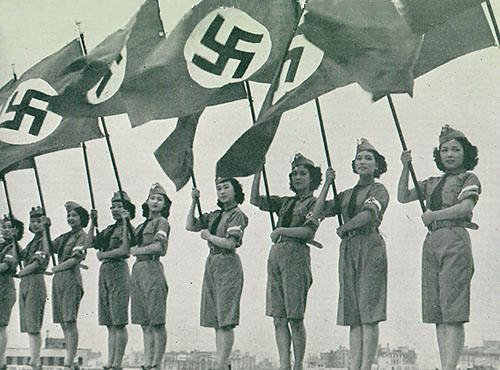
Female members of the Nichigeki dancing team welcoming the Hitlerjugend at Nichigeki Music Hall in Tokyo

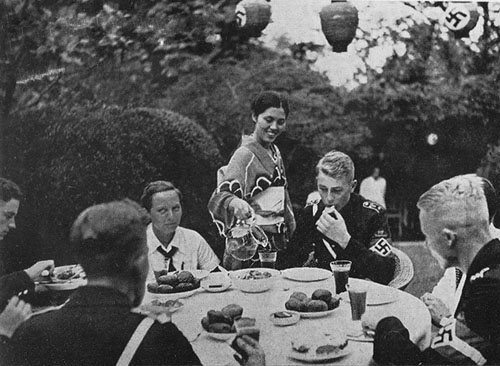
Hitlerjugend having dinner at the German embassy in Tokyo

Although tentative plans for a joint German-Japanese approach against the USSR were hinted on in the 1936 Anti-Comintern Pact, the years 1938 and 1939 were already decisive for Japan's decision to not expand northward, i.e., the Hokushin-ron-inspired Kantokuen-plans against the USSR were shelved to embrace a southern expansion instead. The Empire decisively lost two border fights against the Soviets, the Battles of Lake Khasan and Khalkin Gol, thereby convincing itself that the Imperial Japanese Army, lacking heavy tanks and the like, would be in no position to challenge the Soviet Army at that time. Nevertheless, Hitler's anti-Soviet sentiment soon led to further rapprochements with Japan, since he still believed that Japan would join Germany in a future war against the Soviet Union, either actively by invading southeast Siberia, or passively by binding large parts of the Red Army, which was fearing an attack of Japan's Kwantung Army in Manchukuo, numbering ca. 700,000 men as of the late 1930s.

In contrast to his actual plans, Hitler's concept of stalling – in combination with his frustration with a Japan embroiled in seemingly endless negotiations with the United States, and tending against a war with the USSR – led to a temporary cooperation with the Soviets in the Molotov–Ribbentrop Pact, which was signed in August 1939. Neither Japan nor Italy had been informed beforehand of Germany's pact with the Soviets, demonstrating the constant subliminal mistrust between Nazi Germany and its partners. After all, the pact not only stipulated the division of Poland and Baltic states between both signatories in a secret protocol, but also rendered the Anti-Comintern Pact more or less irrelevant. In order to remove the strain that Hitler's move had put on German–Japanese relations, the "Agreement for Cultural Cooperation between Japan and Germany" was signed in November 1939, only a few weeks after Germany and the Soviet Union had concluded their invasion of Poland and Great Britain and France declared war on Germany.

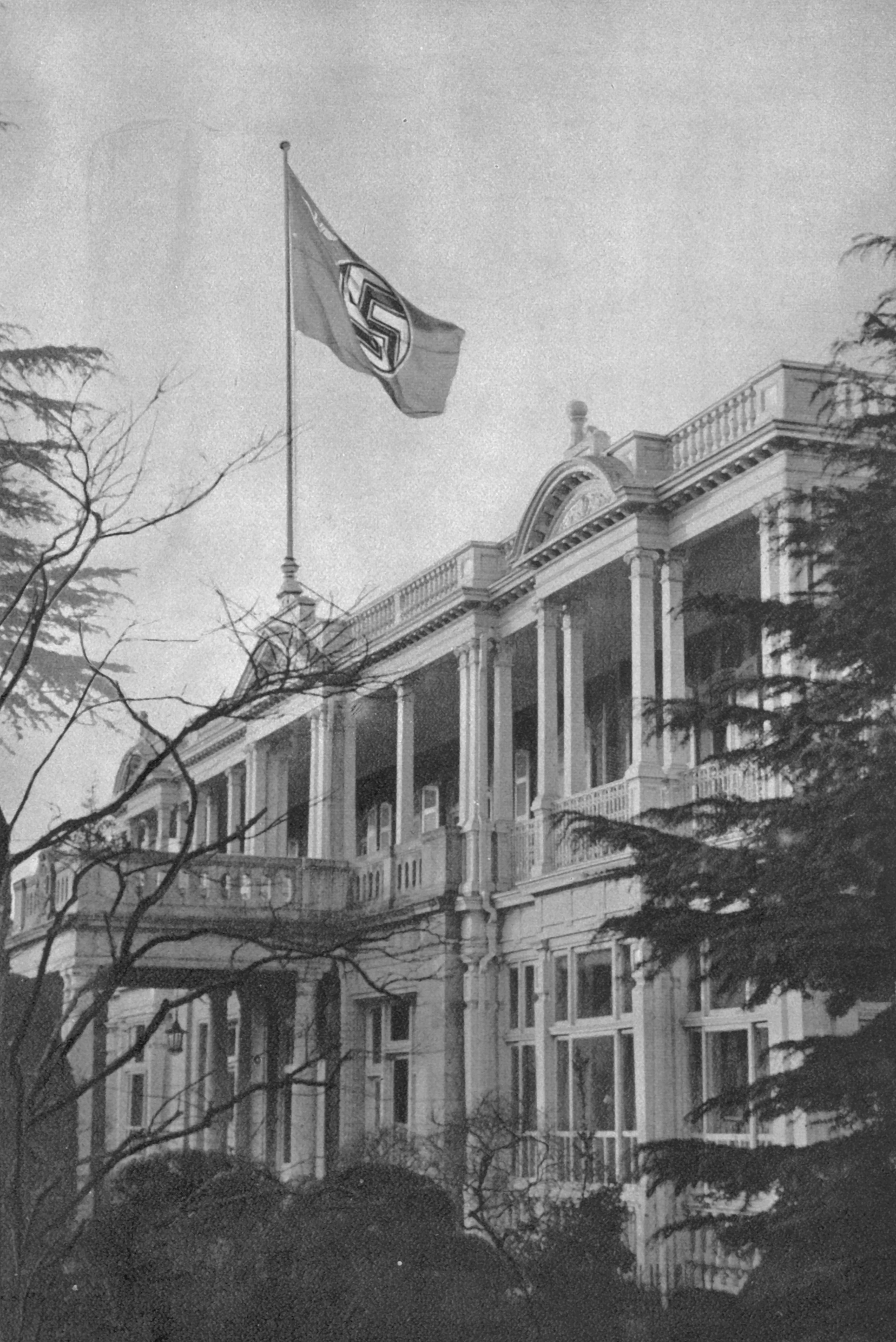
German Embassy in Tokyo

Over the following year, Japan also proceeded with its expansion plans. The Invasion of northern French Indochina on 22 September 1940 (which by then was controlled by the collaborating government of Vichy France), and Japan's ongoing bloody conflict with China, put a severe strain on Japan–United States relations. On 26 July 1940, the United States had passed the Export Control Act, cutting oil, iron and steel exports to Japan. This containment policy was Washington's warning to Japan that any further military expansion would result in further sanctions. However, such US moves were interpreted by Japan's militaristic leaders as signals that they needed to take radical measures to improve the Empire's situation, thereby driving Japan closer to Germany.

==== Formation of the Axis ====
With Nazi Germany not only having conquered most of continental Europe including France, but also maintaining the impression of a Britain facing imminent defeat, Tokyo interpreted the situation in Europe as proof of a fundamental and fatal weakness in western democracies. Japan's leadership concluded that the current state of affairs had to be exploited and subsequently started to seek even closer cooperation with Berlin. Hitler, for his part, not only feared a lasting stalemate with Britain, but also had started planning an invasion of the Soviet Union. These circumstances, together with a shortage in raw materials and food, increased Berlin's interest in a stronger alliance with Tokyo. German foreign minister Joachim von Ribbentrop was sent to negotiate a new treaty with Japan, whose relationships with Germany and Italy, the three soon to be called "Axis powers", were cemented with the Tripartite Pact of 27 September 1940.

The purpose of the Pact, directed against an unnamed power presumed to be the United States, was to deter that power from supporting Britain, thereby not only strengthening Germany's and Italy's cause in the North African Campaign and the Mediterranean theatre, but also weakening British colonies in South-East Asia in advance of a Japanese invasion. The treaty stated that the three countries would respect each other's "leadership" in their respective spheres of influence, and would assist each other if attacked by an outside party. However, already-ongoing conflicts, as of the signing of the Pact, were explicitly excluded. With this defensive terminology, aggression on the part of a member state toward a non-member state would result in no obligations under the Pact. These limitations can be interpreted as a symptom of the German-Japanese relations of that time being driven by mutual self-interest, underpinned by the shared militarist, expansionist and nationalistic ideologies of their respective governments.

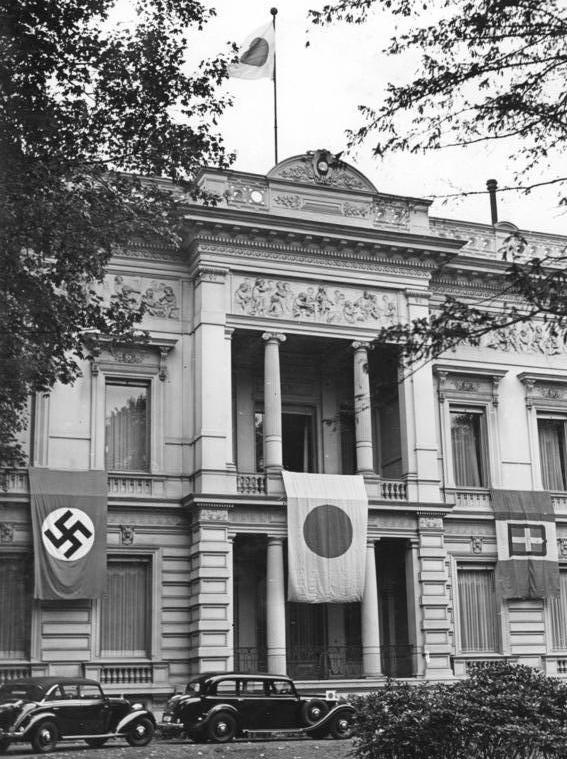
The Japanese embassy in Berlin, clad in the banners of the three signatories of the Tripartite Pact in September 1940

Another decisive limitation in the German-Japanese alliance were the fundamental differences between the two nation's policies towards Jews. With Nazi Germany's well-known attitude being extreme Antisemitism, Japan refrained from adopting any similar posture. On 31 December 1940, Japanese foreign minister Yōsuke Matsuoka, a strong proponent of the Tripartite Pact, told a group of Jewish businessmen:

I am the man responsible for the alliance with Hitler, but nowhere have I promised that we would carry out his anti-Semitic policies in Japan. This is not simply my personal opinion, it is the opinion of Japan, and I have no compunction about announcing it to the world.

— Yōsuke Matsuoka (31 December 1940)

On a similar note, both countries would continue to conceal any war crimes committed by the other side for the remainder of the war. The Holocaust was systematically concealed by the leadership in Tokyo, just as Japanese war crimes, e.g. the situation in China, were kept secret from the German public. An example would be the atrocities committed by the Japanese Army in Nanking in 1937, which were denounced by German industrialist John Rabe. Subsequently, the German leadership ordered Rabe back to Berlin, confiscating all his reports and prohibiting any further discussion of the topic.

Nevertheless, after the signing of the Tripartite Pact, mutual visits of political and military nature increased. After German ace and parachute expert Ernst Udet visited Japan in 1939 to inspect the Japanese aerial forces, reporting to Hermann Göring that "Japanese flyers, though brave and willing, are no sky-beaters", General Tomoyuki Yamashita was given the job of reorganizing the Japanese Air Arm in late 1940. For this purpose, Yamashita arrived in Berlin in January 1941, staying almost six months. He inspected the broken Maginot Line and German fortifications on the French coast, watched German flyers in training, and even flew in a raid over Britain after decorating Hermann Göring, head of the German Luftwaffe, with the Japanese "Grand Cordon of the Rising Sun". General Yamashita also met and talked with Hitler, on whom he commented,

I felt, that in the mind of Hitler there was much of spiritual matters, transcending material plans. When I met the Führer he said that since boyhood he had been attracted by Japan. He read carefully reports of Japan's victory over Russia when he was only 17 years old and was impressed by Japan's astonishing strength.

— Gen. Tomoyuki Yamashita (1940)

According to Yamashita, Hitler promised to remember Japan in his will, by instructing the Germans "to bind themselves eternally to the Japanese spirit."

On 11 November 1940, German–Japanese relations, as well as Japan's plans to expand southwards into South-East Asia, were decisively bolstered when the crew of the German auxiliary cruiser Atlantis boarded the British cargo ship SS Automedon. Fifteen bags of Top Secret mail for the British Far East Command were found, including naval intelligence reports containing the latest assessment of the Japanese Empire's military strength in the Far East, along with details of Royal Air Force units, naval strength, and notes on Singapore's defences. It painted a gloomy picture of British land and naval capabilities in the Far East, and declared that Britain was too weak to risk war with Japan. The mail reached the German embassy in Tokyo on 5 December, and was then hand-carried to Berlin via the Trans-Siberian Railway. On the initiative of the German naval attaché Paul Wenneker, a copy was given to the Japanese; it provided valuable intelligence prior to their commencing hostilities against the Western Powers. The captain of the Atlantis, Bernhard Rogge, was rewarded for this with an ornate katana Samurai sword; the only other Germans honored in this manner were Hermann Göring and Field Marshal Erwin Rommel.

After reading the captured documents, on 7 January 1941 Japanese Admiral Yamamoto wrote to the Naval Minister asking whether, if Japan knocked out America, the remaining British and Dutch forces would be suitably weakened for the Japanese to deliver a deathblow. Thereby, Nanshin-ron, the concept of the Japanese Navy conducting a southern campaign quickly matured and gained further proponents.

==== Stalling coordination of joint war plans ====
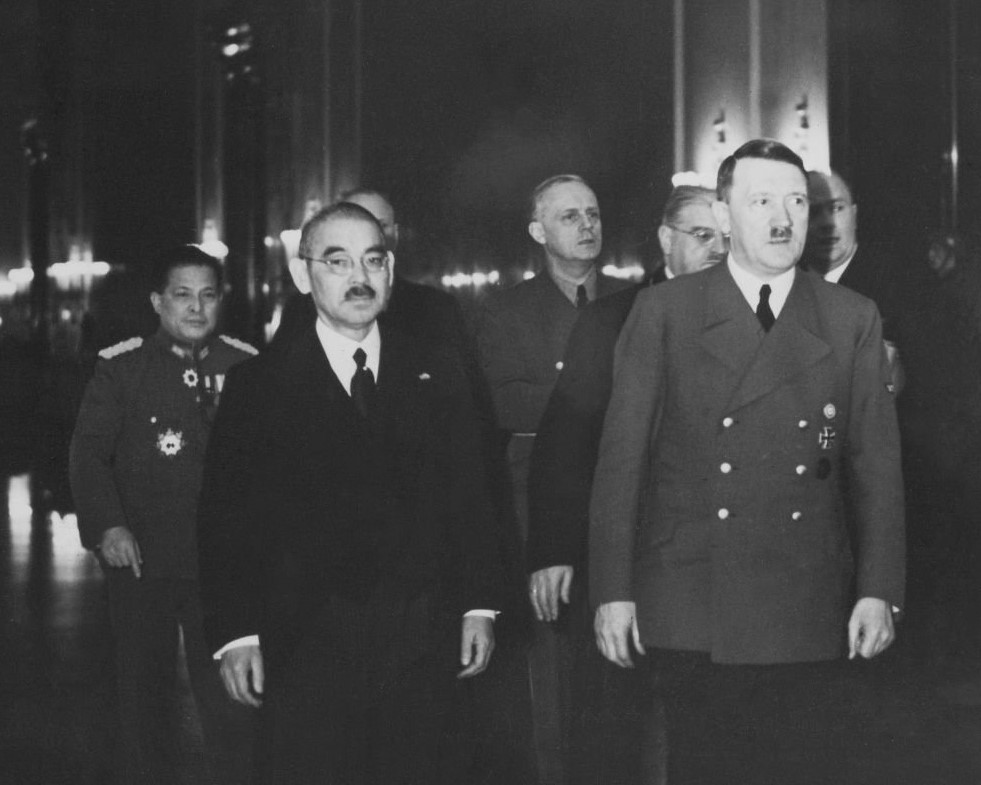
Japanese foreign minister Yōsuke Matsuoka visits Adolf Hitler in Berlin in March 1941

Hitler, on the other hand, was concluding the preparations for "Operation Barbarossa", the invasion of the Soviet Union. In order to directly or indirectly support his imminent eastward strike, the Führer had repeatedly suggested to Japan that it reconsider plans for an attack on the Soviet Far East throughout 1940 and 1941. In February 1941, as a result of Hitler's insistence, General Oshima returned to Berlin as ambassador. On 5 March 1941, Wilhelm Keitel, chief of OKW issued "Basic Order Number 24 regarding Collaboration with Japan":

1. It must be the aim of the collaboration based on the Three Power Pact to induce Japan, as soon as possible, to take active measures in the Far East. Strong British forces will thereby be tied down, and the center of gravity of the interests of the United States of America will be diverted to the Pacific. The sooner she intervenes, the greater will be the prospects of success for Japan in view of the still undeveloped preparedness for war on the part of her adversaries. The Barbarossa operation will create particularly favorable political and military prerequisites for this.
2. To prepare the way for the collaboration it is essential to strengthen the Japanese military potential with all means available. For this purpose the High Commands of the branches of the Armed Forces will comply in a comprehensive and generous manner with Japanese desires for information regarding German war and combat experience, and for assistance in military economics and in technical matters. Reciprocity is desirable, but this factor should not stand in the way of negotiations. Priority should naturally be given to those Japanese requests which would have the most immediate application in waging war. In special cases the Führer reserves the decisions for himself.
3. The harmonizing of the operational plans of the two parties is the responsibility of the Naval High Command. This will be subject to the following guiding principles:
  1. The common aim of the conduct of war is to be stressed as forcing England to the ground quickly and thereby keeping the United States out of the war. Beyond this Germany has no political, military, or economic interests in the Far East which would give occasion for any reservations with regard to Japanese intentions.
  2. The great successes achieved by Germany in mercantile warfare make it appear particularly suitable to employ strong Japanese forces for the same purpose. In this connection every opportunity to support German mercantile warfare must be exploited.
  3. The raw material situation of the pact powers demands that Japan should acquire possession of those territories which it needs for the continuation of the war, especially if the United States intervenes. Rubber shipments must be carried out even after the entry of Japan into the war, since they are of vital importance to Germany.
  4. The seizure of Singapore as the key British position in the Far East would mean a decisive success for the entire conduct of war of the three powers. In addition, attacks on other systems of bases of British naval power – extending to those of American naval power only if the entry of the United States into the war cannot be prevented – will result in weakening the enemy's system of power in that region and also, just like the attack on sea communications, in tying down substantial forces of all kinds (e.g. Australia). A date for the beginning of operational discussions cannot yet be fixed.
4. In the military commissions to be formed in accordance with the Tripartite Pact, only such questions are to be dealt with as equally concern the three participating powers. These will include primarily the problems of economic warfare. The working out of the details is the responsibility of the main commission, with the co-operation of the Armed Forces High Command.
5. The Japanese must not be given any intimation of the Barbarossa operations.

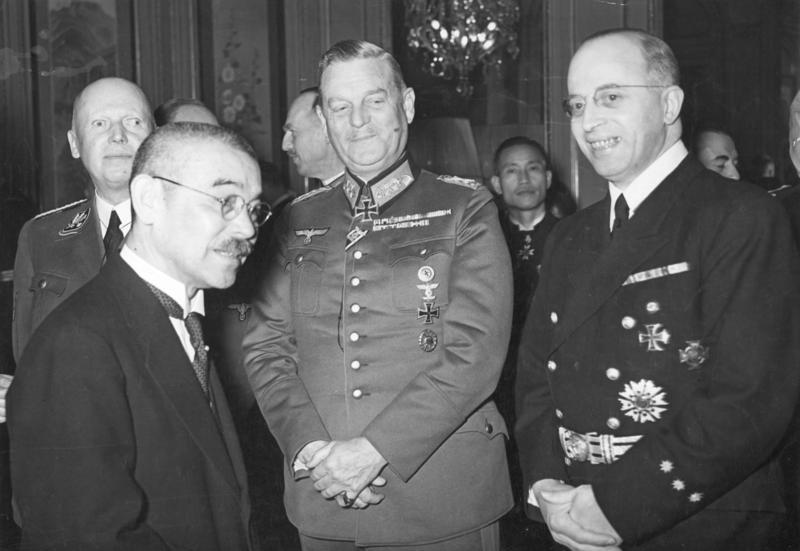
Matsuoka with Generalfeldmarschall Wilhelm Keitel (centre) and ambassador Heinrich Georg Stahmer (right) at a reception in the Japanese embassy in Berlin on 29 March 1941

On 18 March 1941, at a conference attended by Hitler, Alfred Jodl, Wilhelm Keitel and Erich Raeder, Admiral Raeder stated:

Japan must take steps to seize Singapore as soon as possible, since the opportunity will never again be as favorable (tie-up of the whole English fleet; unpreparedness of U.S.A. for war against Japan; inferiority of the United States Pacific Fleet in comparison with the Japanese). Japan is indeed making preparations for this action; but according to all declarations made by Japanese officers, she will only carry it out if Germany proceeds to land in England. Germany must, therefore, concentrate all her efforts on spurring Japan to act immediately. If Japan has Singapore, all other East Asiatic questions regarding the U.S.A. and England are thereby solved (Guam, Philippines, Borneo, Dutch East Indies). Japan wishes, if possible, to avoid war against the U.S.A. She can do so if she determinedly takes Singapore as soon as possible.

— Adm. Erich Reader (18 March 1941)

In talks involving Hitler, his foreign minister Joachim von Ribbentrop, his Japanese counterpart at that time, Yōsuke Matsuoka, as well as Berlin's and Tokyo's respective ambassadors, Eugen Ott and Hiroshi Ōshima, the German side then broadly hinted at, but never openly asked for, either invading the Soviet Union from the east or attacking Britain's colonies in South-East Asia, thereby preoccupying and diverting the British Empire away from Europe and thus somewhat covering Germany's back. Although Germany would have clearly favored Japan's attacking the USSR, exchanges between the two allies were always kept overly formal and indirect, as shown in the following statement by Hitler to ambassador Ōshima (2 June 1941):

It would, of course, be up to Japan to act as it saw fit, but Japan's cooperation in the fight against the Soviet Union would be welcomed if the [Japanese] advance to the south should run into difficulty because of supply and equipment.

— Adolf Hitler to Ambassador Oshima (2 June 1941)

Matsuoka, Ōshima and parts of the Japanese Imperial Army were proponents of Hokushin-ron, Japan's go-north strategy aiming for a coordinated attack with Germany against the USSR and seizing East Siberia. But the Japanese army-dominated military leadership, namely persons like minister of war Hideki Tōjō, were constantly pressured by the Japanese Imperial Navy and, thus, a strong tendency towards Nanshin-ron existed already in 1940, meaning to go south and exploit the weakened European powers by occupying their resource-rich colonies in South-East Asia. In order to secure Japan's back while expanding southwards and as a Soviet effort to demonstrate peaceful intentions toward Germany, the Soviet–Japanese Neutrality Pact was signed in Moscow on 13 April 1941 by Matsuoka on his return trip from a visit to Berlin. Joseph Stalin had little faith in Japan's commitment to neutrality, but he felt that the pact was important for its political symbolism, to reinforce a public affection for Germany. Hitler, who was not informed in advance by the Japanese and considering the pact a ruse to stall, misinterpreted the diplomatic situation and thought that his attack on the USSR would bring a tremendous relief for Japan in East Asia and thereby a much stronger threat to American activities through Japanese interventions. As a consequence, Nazi Germany pressed forward with Operation Barbarossa, its attack on the Soviet Union, which started two months later on 22 June without any specific warning to its Axis partners.

From Japan's point of view, the attack on Russia very nearly ruptured the Tripartite Pact, since the Empire had been depending on Germany to help in maintaining good relations with Moscow so as to preclude any threat from Siberia. Prime Minister Fumimaro Konoe felt betrayed because the Germans clearly trusted their Axis allies too little to warn them about Barbarossa, even though he had feared the worst since receiving an April report from Ōshima in Berlin that "a Soviet-German war might break out in the near future". Foreign minister Matsuoka on the other hand earnestly tried to convince the Emperor, the cabinet, as well as the army staff of the imminent attack on the Soviet Union. However, his colleagues—regarding him as "Hitler's office boy" by now—rejected any such proposal and pointed out the fact that the Japanese army, with its light and medium tanks, had no intention of taking on Soviet tanks and aircraft until they could be certain that the Wehrmacht had smashed the Red Army to the brink of defeat.

Subsequently, Konoe removed Matsuoka from his cabinet and stepped up Japan's negotiations with the US again, which still failed over the China and Indochina issues, however, and the American demand to Japan to withdraw from the Tripartite Pact in anticipation of any settlement. Without any perspective with respect to Washington, Matsuoka felt that his government had to reassure Germany of its loyalty to the pact. In Berlin, Ōshima was ordered to convey to the German foreign minister Ribbentrop that the "Japanese government have decided to secure 'points d'appui' in French Indochina [i.e., also occupy its southern half] to enable further to strengthen her pressure on Great Britain and the United States of America", and to present this as a "valuable contribution to the common front" by promising that "We Japanese are not going to sit on the fence while you Germans fight the Russians."

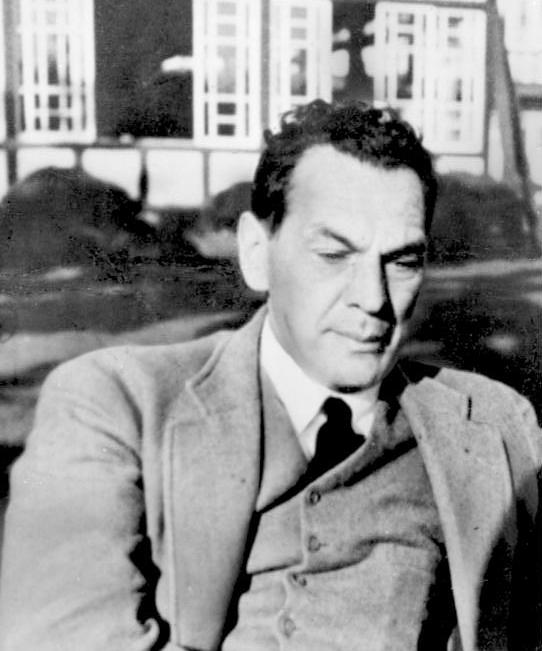
Soviet spy Richard Sorge revealed Japan's unwillingness to cooperate with Hitler against the USSR in September 1941.

Over the first months, Germany's advances in Soviet Russia were spectacular and Stalin's need to transfer troops currently protecting South-East Siberia from a potential Japanese attack to the future defense of Moscow grew. Japan's Kwantung Army in Manchukuo was constantly kept in manoeuvres and, in talks with German foreign minister Ribbentrop, ambassador Oshima in Berlin repeatedly hinted at an "imminent Japanese attack" against the USSR. In fact, however, the leadership in Tokyo at this time had in no way changed its mind and these actions were merely concerted to create the illusion of an eastern threat to the Soviet Union in an effort to bind its Siberian divisions. Unknown to Japan and Germany, however, Richard Sorge, a Soviet spy disguised as a German journalist working for Eugen Ott, the German ambassador in Tokyo, advised the Red Army on 14 September 1941, that the Japanese were not going to attack the Soviet Union until:

- Moscow was captured
- the size of the Kwantung Army was three times that of the Soviet Union's Far Eastern forces
- a civil war had started in Siberia.

Toward the end of September 1941, Sorge transmitted information that Japan would not initiate hostilities against the USSR in the East, thereby freeing Red Army divisions stationed in Siberia for the defence of Moscow. In October 1941 Sorge was unmasked and arrested by the Japanese. Apparently, he was entirely trusted by the German ambassador Eugen Ott, and was allowed access to top secret cables from Berlin in the embassy in Tokyo. Eventually, this involvement would lead to Heinrich Georg Stahmer replacing Ott in January 1943. Sorge on the other hand would be executed in November 1944 and elevated to a national hero in the Soviet Union.

==== Japan enters World War II ====
In September 1941, Japan began its southward expansion by expanding its military presence to southern Indochina ("securing 'points d'appui'") and decisively increased the number of stationed personnel and planes. This provoked the United States, the United Kingdom, and other Western governments to freeze Japanese assets, while the US (which supplied 80 percent of Japan's oil) responded by placing a complete oil embargo on the Japanese Empire. As a result, Japan was essentially forced to choose between abandoning its ambitions in South-East Asia and its prosecution of the war against China, or seizing the natural resources it needed by force. The Japanese military did not consider the former an option as attacking Soviet Russia instead of expanding into South Asia had become a more and more unpopular choice since Japan's humiliating defeat in 1939 at the Battle of Khalkin Gol against General Georgy Zhukov amongst others and the final rejection of any near-term action in Siberia shortly after Germany began its invasion of the USSR. Moreover, many officers considered America's oil embargo an unspoken declaration of war. With the harsh oil sanctions imposed by the United States, the Japanese leadership was now even more determined to remain in China. Germany had refused to sell Japan the blueprints to make synthetic fuel, so Japan's only hope for oil was to invade the Dutch East Indies, which would result in war with the United States and Britain. To succeed the Japanese had to neutralize the powerful United States Pacific Fleet, so they could prevent it from interfering with future Japanese movements in South-East Asia and negotiate peace terms from a strong hand. Hitler and Ribbentrop agreed that Germany would almost certainly declare war when the Japanese first informed them of their intention to go to war with the United States on 17 November 1941.

On 25 November 1941, Germany tried to further solidify the alliance against Soviet Russia by officially reviving the Anti-Comintern Pact of 1936, now joined by additional signatories, Hungary and Romania. However, for several reasons including logistics and Soviet defenses being reinforced by East Siberian divisions, Germany's offensive on Moscow ground to a halt with the onset of the Russian winter in November and December 1941. In the face of his failing Blitzkrieg tactics, Hitler's confidence in a successful and swift conclusion of the war diminished, especially with a US-supported Britain being a constant threat in the Reich's western front. Furthermore, it was evident that the "neutrality" which the US had superficially maintained to that point would soon change to an open and unlimited support of Britain against Germany. Hitler thus welcomed Japan's sudden entry into the war with its air raid on the American naval base at Pearl Harbor on 7 December 1941 and its subsequent declaration of war on the United States and Britain, just two days after the Soviet Union started to push the Germans away from Moscow with a successful counter-offensive led by General Zhukov, who had already defeated the Japanese at Khalkhin Gol in 1939. Upon learning of Japan's successful attack, Hitler even became euphoric, stating: "With such a capable ally we cannot lose this war." Preceding Japan's attack were numerous communiqués between Berlin and Tokyo. The respective ambassadors Ott and Ōshima tried to draft an amendment to the Tripartite Pact, in which Germany, Japan and Italy should pledge each other's allegiance in the case one signatory is attacked by – or attacks – the United States. Although the protocol was finished in time, it would not be formally signed by Germany until four days after the raid on Pearl Harbor. Also among the communiqués was another definitive Japanese rejection of any war plans against Russia:

In case Germany demands that we participate in the war against the Soviet Union, we will respond that we do not intend to join the war for the time being. If this should lead to a situation whereby Germany will delay her entry into the war against the United States, it cannot be helped.

— Japanese communiqué to Berlin (December 1941)

Nevertheless, publicly the German leadership applauded their new ally and ambassador Ōshima became one of only eight recipients of the Grand Cross of the Order of the German Eagle in Gold, which was awarded by Hitler himself, who reportedly said:

You gave the right declaration of war. This method is the only proper one. Japan pursued it formerly and it corresponds with his own system, that is, to negotiate as long as possible. But if one sees that the other is interested only in putting one off, in shaming and humiliating one, and is not willing to come to an agreement, then one should strike as hard as possible, and not waste time declaring war.

— Adolf Hitler about the Japanese raid on Pearl Harbor (December 1941)

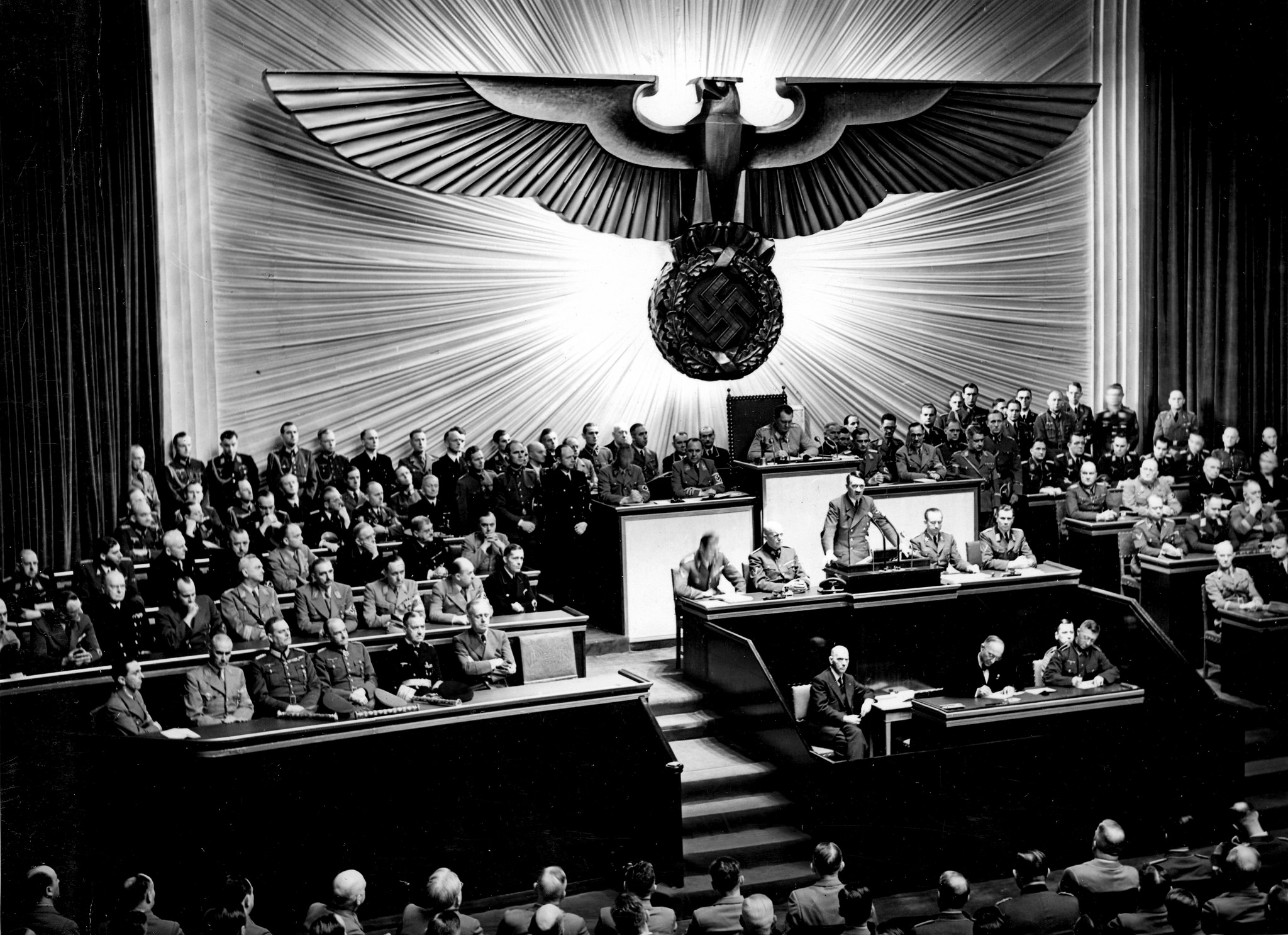
Adolf Hitler declares war on the United States on 11 December 1941 in the wake of Japan's attack on Pearl Harbor.

Although the amendment to the Tripartite Pact was not yet in force, Hitler chose to declare war on the United States and ordered the Reichstag, along with Italy, to do so on 11 December 1941, three days after the United States' declaration of war on the Empire of Japan. Roosevelt's "shoot on sight" order had effectively declared naval war on Germany and Italy in September 1941, and Germany had learned of Rainbow Five in early December. Hitler could no longer ignore the amount of economic and military aid the US was giving Britain and the USSR. Hitler's hopes that, despite the previous rejections, Japan would reciprocally attack the Soviet Union, were not realized, as Japan stuck to its Nanshin strategy of going south, not north, and would continue to maintain an uneasy peace with the Soviet Union. Nevertheless, Germany's declaration of war further solidified German–Japanese relations and showed Germany's solidarity with Japan, which was now encouraged to cooperate against the British. To some degree, Japan's actions in South-East Asia and the Pacific in the months after Pearl Harbor, including the sinking of HMS Prince of Wales and HMS Repulse, the occupation of the Crown Colonies of Singapore, Hong Kong, and British Burma, and the raids in the Indian Ocean as well as on Australia, were a tremendous blow to the United Kingdom's war effort and preoccupied the Allies, shifting British (including Australian) and American assets away from the Battle of the Atlantic and the North African Campaign against Germany to Asia and the Pacific against Japan. In this context, sizeable forces of the British Empire were withdrawn from North Africa to the Pacific theatre with their replacements being only relatively inexperienced and thinly spread divisions. Taking advantage of this situation, Erwin Rommel's Afrika Korps successfully attacked only six weeks after Pearl Harbor, eventually pushing the allied lines as far east as El Alamein.

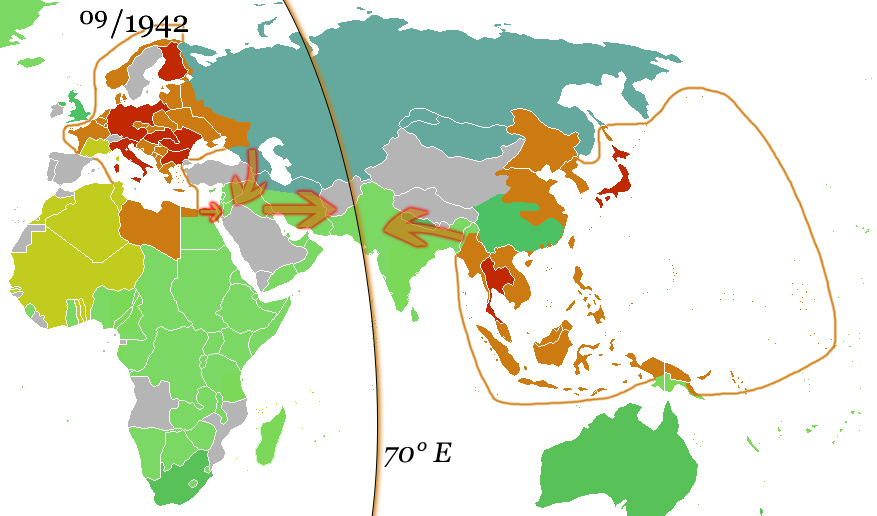
German and Japanese direct spheres of influence at their greatest extents in fall 1942. Arrows show planned movements to an agreed demarcation line at 70° E, which was, however, never even approximated.

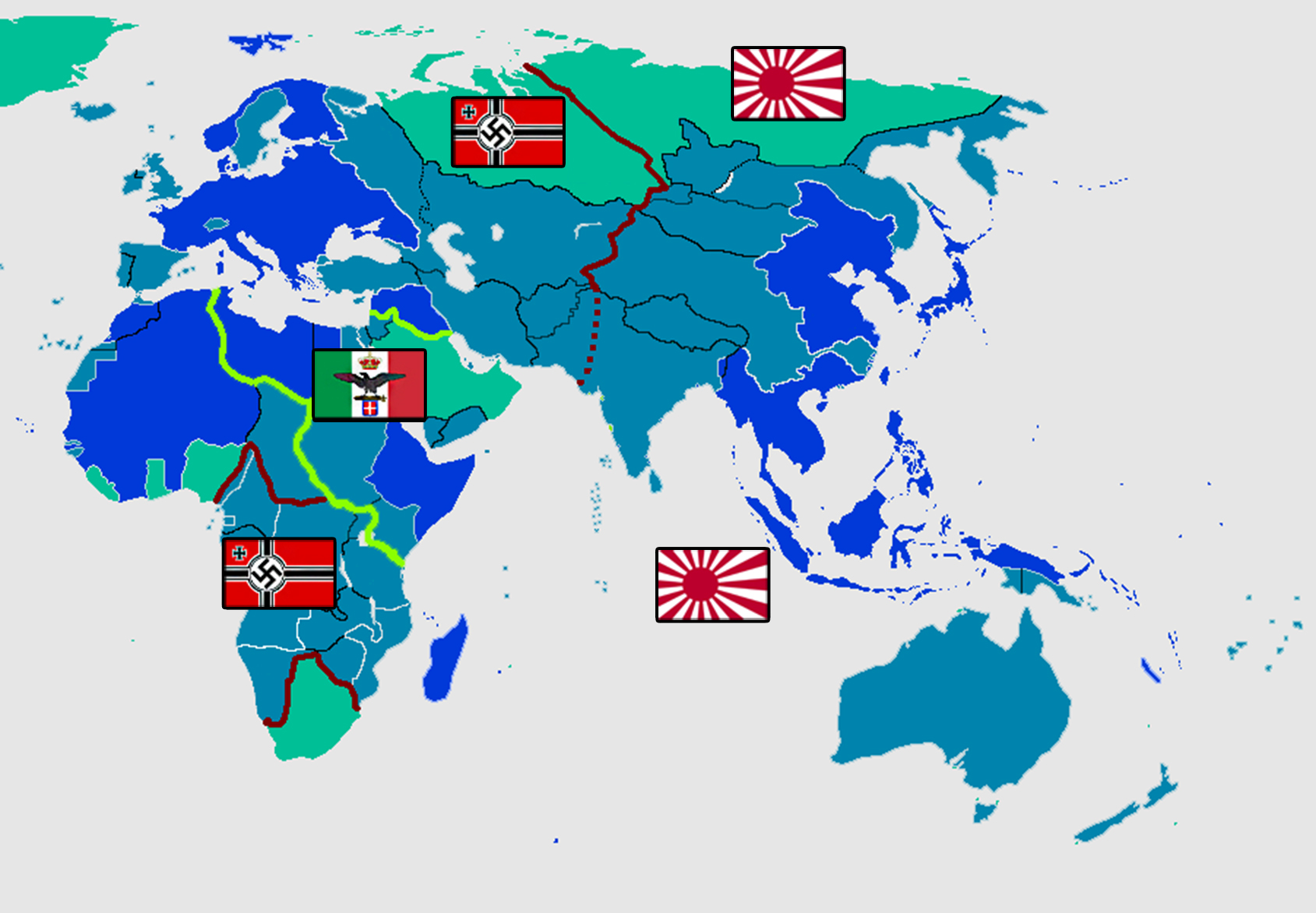
Axis Powers planned partition of Afro-Eurasia. Nazi German and Imperial Japan sphere of influence would clash from Yenisey river to the Indian Ocean. However, there were discussions over the influence on British India, Afghanistan, Tibet and Soviet Turkestan.

Until the attack on the Soviet Union, Germany and Japan were able to exchange materials and personnel using the Trans-Siberian Railway. Afterwards, IJN submarines had to be sent on so-called Yanagi (Willow) – missions, since the American and British navies rendered the high seas too dangerous for Axis surface cargo ships. However, given the limited capacities of submarines, eyes were soon focused directly on the Mediterranean, the Middle East and British India, all vital to the British war effort. In the long run, Germany and Japan envisioned a partnered linkage running across the British-held Indian subcontinent that would allow for the transfer of weaponry and resources as well as potential joint military operations. After all, the choice of potential trading partners was very limited during the war and Germany was anxious for rubber and precious metals, while the Japanese sought industrial products, technical equipment, and chemical goods. By August 1942 the German advances in North Africa rendered an offensive against Alexandria and the Suez Canal feasible, which, in turn, had the potential of enabling maritime trade between Europe and Japan through the Indian Ocean. On the other hand, in the face of its defeat at the Battle of Midway in June 1942 with the loss of four aircraft carriers, the Japanese Navy decided to pursue all possibilities of gaining additional resources to quickly rebuild its forces. As a consequence, Ambassador Ōshima in Berlin was ordered to submit an extensive "wish list" requesting the purchase of vast amounts of steel and aluminium to be shipped from Germany to Japan. German Foreign Minister Ribbentrop quickly dismissed Tokyo's proposal, since those resources were vital for Germany's own industry. However, in order to gain Japanese backing for a new German-Japanese trade treaty, which should also secure the rights of German companies in South-East Asia, he asked Hitler to at least partially agree upon the Japanese demands. It took another five months of arguing over the Reichsmark-Yen-exchange rate and additional talks with the third signatory, the Italian government, until the "Treaty on Economic Cooperation" was signed on 20 January 1943.

==== Limitations and decline of the Axis ====
Despite this treaty, the envisioned German-Japanese economic relations were never able to grow beyond mostly propagandistic status. The British kept control of the Suez Canal and submarines with very small cargo capability remained the main method of contact. With the loss of North Africa and the heavy defeat at Stalingrad, Germany was in a defensive posture by early 1943, and never regained the initiative.

Japan was being outproduced in carriers and was unable to launch any offensives after its defeat at Midway in June 1942. It was overextended and could not even feed its garrisons on islands across the Pacific. Tokyo's plan of conquering the Solomons at Australia's doorstep turned into a continuous retreat for the Japanese of which the defeat on Guadalcanal in early 1943 marked the beginning. Japan's invasion of India had been halted at Imphal and Kohima, rendering impossible any joint operations against India.

With submarines remaining practically the only link between Nazi-controlled Europe and Japan, trade was soon focused on strategic goods such as technical plans and weapon templates. Only 20–40% of goods managed to reach either destination and merely 96 persons travelled by submarine from Europe to Japan and 89 vice versa during the war as only six submarines succeeded in their attempts of the trans-oceanic voyage: I-30 (August 1942), delivering drawings and examples of the torpedo bomber-deployed, aerial Type 91 torpedo used in the Attack on Pearl Harbor, I-8 (June 1943), I-34 (October 1943), I-29 (December 1943), I-52 (March 1944), and the German submarine U-511 (August 1943). Before I-29 embarked on her voyage to German-occupied France in December 1943, she had rendezvoused with the German submarine U-180 during an earlier mission to the Indian Ocean. During this meeting on 28 April 1943, Indian nationalist Subhas Chandra Bose transferred to I-29, thereby becoming the only civilian exchange between two submarines of two different navies in World War II. U-234 on the other hand is one of the most popular examples of an aborted Yanagi mission in May 1945. Amongst others, her cargo included examples of the newest electric torpedoes, one crated Me 262 jet aircraft, a Henschel Hs 293 glide bomb, and 560 kg of uranium oxide. Whether the uranium was weapons-grade material has not yet been clarified, however.

On rare occasions, German surface ships were able to reach Japan as well. These included auxiliary cruisers Michel and Thor, which were brought to Yokohama after the Kriegsmarine chiefs realized in late 1942 that it would not be practical for them to return to Germany-controlled European ports. German supply ships (Uckermark) and foreign ships captured by German merchant raiders would come to Japanese ports as well.

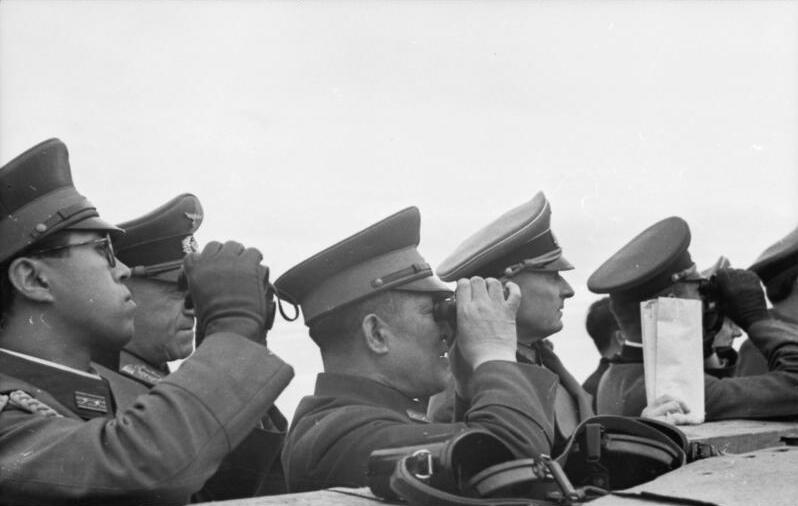
German and Japanese officers including ambassador Ōshima (center) tour the Atlantic Wall in southern France in September 1943.

In the face of their failing war plans, Japanese and German representatives more and more began to deceive each other at tactical briefings by exaggerating minor victories and deemphasizing losses. In several talks in spring and summer 1943 between Generaloberst Alfred Jodl and the Japanese naval attaché in Berlin, Vice Admiral Naokuni Nomura, Jodl downplayed the afore described defeats of the German Army, e.g. by claiming the Soviet offensive would soon run out of steam and that "anywhere the Wehrmacht can be sent on land, it is sure of its untertaking, but where it has to be taken over sea, it becomes somewhat more difficult." Japan, on the other hand, not only evaded any disclosure of its true strategic position in the Pacific, but also declined any interference in American shipments being unloaded at Vladivostok and large numbers of men and amounts of material being transported from East Siberia to the German front in the west. Being forced to watch the continued reinforcement of Soviet troops from the east without any Japanese intervention was a thorn in Hitler's flesh, especially considering Japan's apparent ignorance with respect to the recent Casablanca Conference at which the Allies declared only to accept the unconditional surrenders of the Axis nations. During a private briefing on 5 March 1943, Hitler remarked:

They lie right to your face and in the end all their depictions are calculated on something which turns out to be a deceit afterwards!

— Adolf Hitler about the Japanese (5 March 1943)

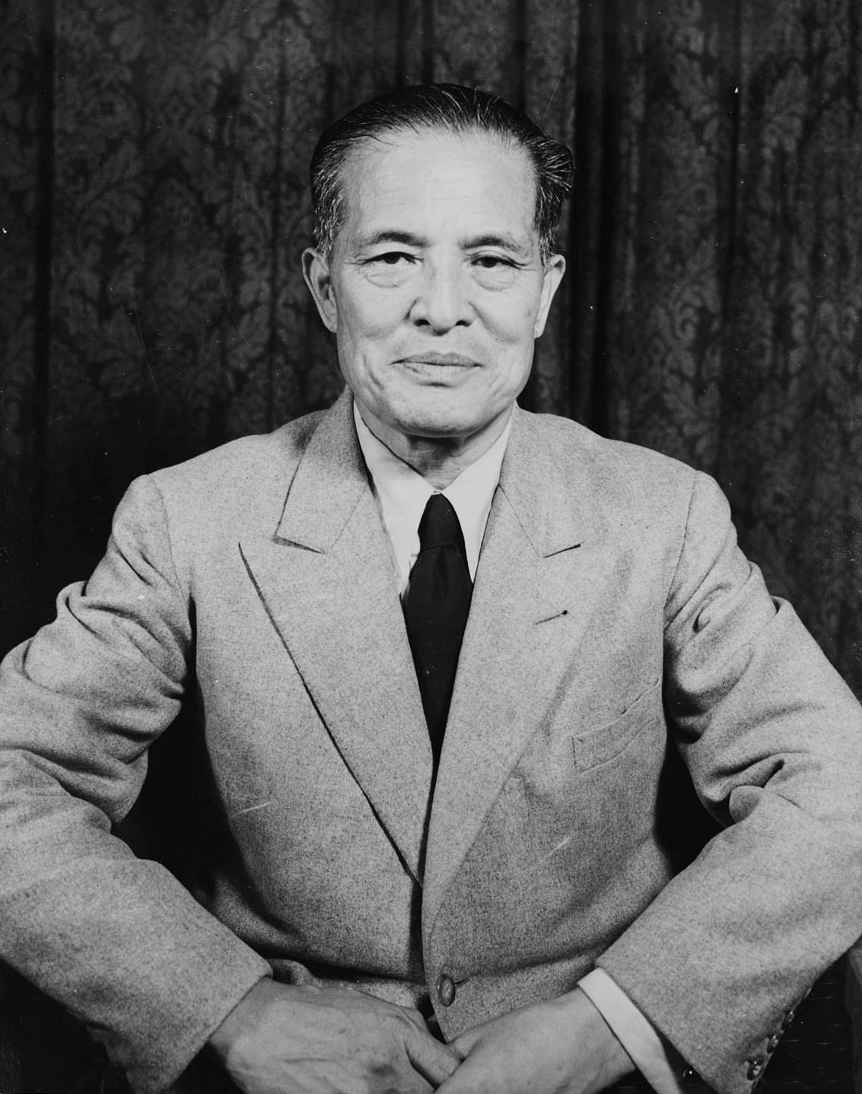
Hiroshi Ōshima, ambassador to Germany until May 1945

As the war progressed and Germany began to retreat further, Japanese ambassador Ōshima never wavered in his confidence that Germany would emerge victorious. However, in March 1945 he reported to Tokyo on the "danger of Berlin becoming a battlefield" and revealing a fear "that the abandonment of Berlin may take place another month". On 13 April, he met with Ribbentrop – for the last time, it turned out – and vowed to stand with the leaders of the Third Reich in their hour of crisis but had to leave Berlin at once by Hitler's direct order. On 7 and 8 May 1945, as the German government surrendered to the Allied powers, Ōshima and his staff were taken into custody and brought to the United States. Now fighting an even more hopeless war, the Japanese government immediately denounced the German surrender as an act of treason and interned the few German individuals as well as confiscated all German property (such as submarines) in Japanese territory at the time. Four months later, on 2 September, Japan had to sign its own surrender documents.

==== Alleged German-Japanese long-term conspiracy ====
After the Second World War was officially concluded with the capitulation of the Empire of Japan, plans for trying the major German and Japanese war criminals were quickly implemented in 1946. While Japanese officials had to face the Tokyo Trials, major German war crimes were dealt with at the Nuremberg Trials. Here it was the goal of the Allied prosecutors to portray the limited cooperation between the Third Reich and Imperial Japan as a long-planned conspiracy to divide the world among the two Axis-partners and thereby delivering just another demonstration of the common viciousness expressed by alleged joint long-term war plans.

The Nazi plans of aggression called for use of Asiatic allies and they found among the Japanese men of kindred mind and purpose. They were brothers, under the skin.

— Robert H. Jackson, American chief prosecutor at the Nuremberg Trials 1945/46

Although there was a limited and cautious military cooperation between Japan and Germany during the Second World War, no documents corroborating any long-term planning or real coordination of military operations of both powers exist.

=== Post-WWII developments ===
==== Rebuilding relations and new common interests ====
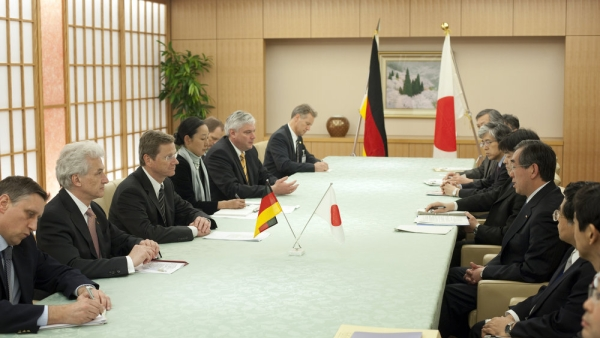
Meeting of German Foreign Minister Guido Westerwelle and Japanese Minister for Foreign Affairs Takeaki Matsumoto in Tokyo after the 2011 Tōhoku earthquake and tsunami

After their defeat in World War II, both Japan and Germany were occupied. Japan regained its sovereignty with the Treaty of San Francisco in 1952 and joined the United Nations in 1956. Germany was split into two states. It was agreed in 1951 to take up diplomatic relations between Japan and the Federal Republic of Germany (West Germany). The bilateral diplomatic ties between West Germany and Japan were fully restored in 1955, between East Germany and Japan in 1973, the year both German states became UN-members.

Beginning in the 1950s, Japanese companies sought to acquire needed raw materials like steel and chemical products in the West German Ruhr region, with a small Japanese business community in Düsseldorf. In 1969, Japanese Culture Institute opened in Cologne which became a part of Japan Foundation in 1972. This Institute has a library and cinema and also offers a Japanese language course. In 1985, Japanese German center also opened in Berlin at locality of Dahlem due to suggestion between both country leaders Helmut Kohl and Nakasone Yasuhiro. In 1974, West Germany and Japan signed an intergovernmental agreement on cooperation in science and technology, re-intensifying joint scientific endeavours and technological exchange. The accord resulted in numerous projects, generally focused on marine research and geosciences, life sciences and environmental research. Additionally, youth exchange programs were launched, including a "Youth Summit" held annually since 1974.

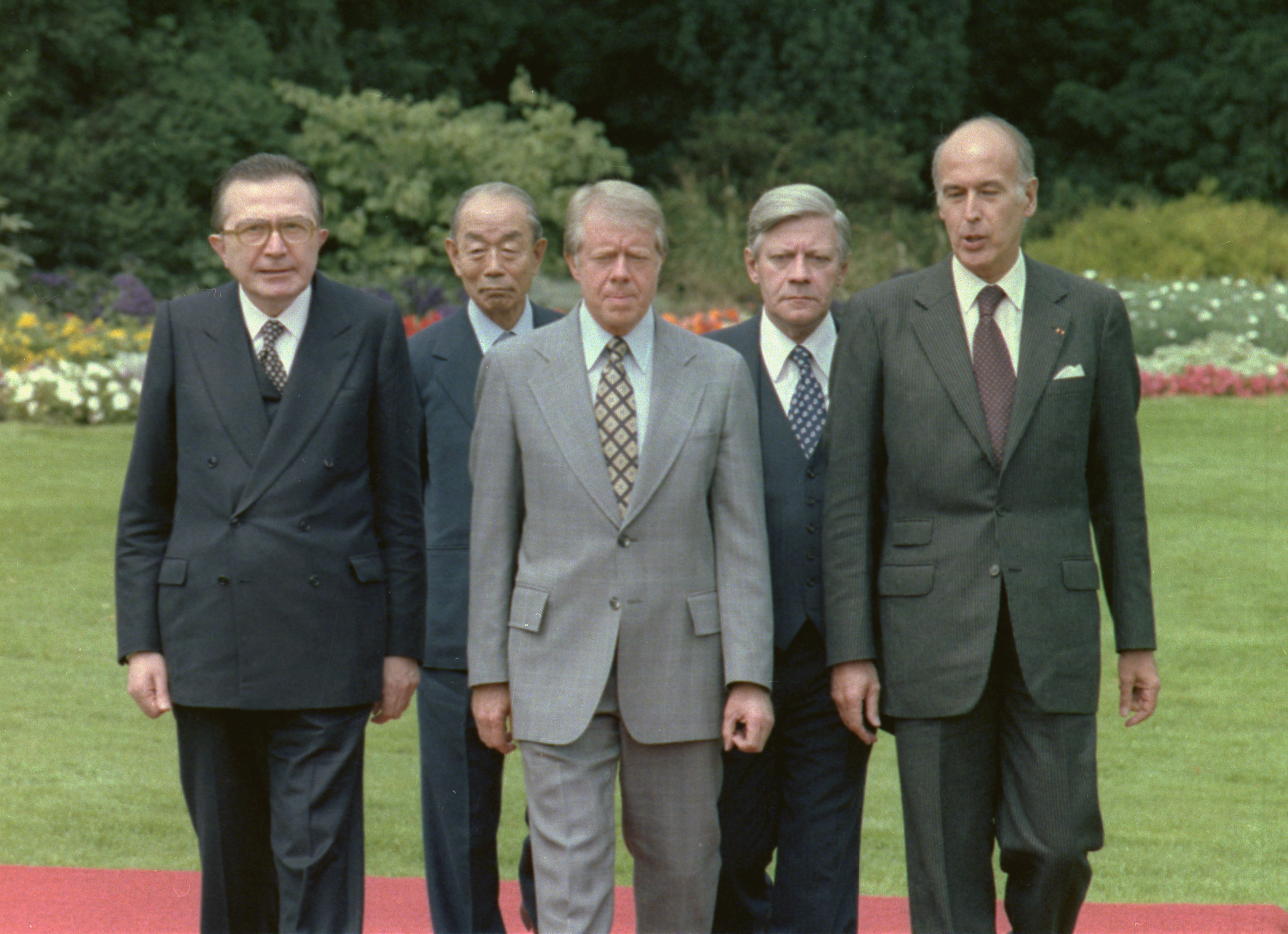
Five of the leaders at the 4th G7 summit in 1978 with Japanese Prime Minister Takeo Fukuda and West German Chancellor Helmut Schmidt being second and fourth from the left

West German-Japanese political dealings were enlarged with both countries taking part in the creation of the so-called Group of Six, or simply "G6", together with the US, the UK, France and Italy in 1975 as a response to the 1973 oil crisis. The G6 was soon expanded by Canada and later Russia, with G6-, G7-, and later G8-, summits being held annually since then. In the 1980s, West German and Japanese representatives decided to rebuild the old Japanese embassy in Berlin. The Japanese embassy in Berlin had been constructed between 1938 and 1942 under the oversight of Albert Speer. Badly damaged during World War II the former embassy was rebuilt as Japanese Cultural Centre, but reverted to being the Japanese Embassy in the German capital city after the fall of the Berlin Wall. In addition to the original complex, several changes and additions were made until 2000, like moving the main entrance to the Hiroshima Street, which was named in honour of the Japanese city, and the creation of a traditional Japanese Garden.

Over the following years, institutions, such as in 1985 the "Japanese–German Center" (JDZB) in Berlin and in 1988 the German Institute for Japanese Studies (DIJ) in Tokyo, were founded to further contribute to the academic and scientific exchange between Japan and West Germany.

Post-war relations between Japan and both Germanies, as well as with unified Germany since 1990, have generally focused on economic and business questions. Germany, dedicated to free trade, continues to be Japan's largest trading partner within Europe. This general posture is also reflected in the so-called "7 pillars of cooperation" agreed on by Foreign Minister of Japan Yōhei Kōno and Foreign Minister of Germany Joschka Fischer on 30 October 2000:

- Pillar 1: Contribution for peace and stability of the international community
- Pillar 2: Consolidation of economic and trade relationships, under benefit of globalization impulses.
- Pillar 3: Contribution for a solution of global problems and social duties and responsibilities.
- Pillar 4: Contribution for the stability in the regions (Korean Peninsula, People's Republic of China, former Yugoslavia, Russia, South Asia, new independent states, Middle East and Gulf region, Middle and South America, East Timor, Africa)
- Pillar 5: Further constitution of faithful political relations between Japan and Germany
- Pillar 6: Promotion of economic relations
- Pillar 7: Promotion of mutual understanding and the cultural relations

In 2000, bilateral cultural exchange culminated in the "Japan in Germany" year, which was then followed by the "Germany in Japan" year in 2005/2006. Also in 2005, the annual German Film Festival in Tokyo was brought into being.

In 2004, German Chancellor Gerhard Schröder and Japanese Prime Minister Junichiro Koizumi agreed upon cooperations in the assistance for reconstruction of Iraq and Afghanistan, the promotion of economic exchange activities, youth and sports exchanges as well as exchanges and cooperation in science, technology and academic fields.

==== Current relations ====
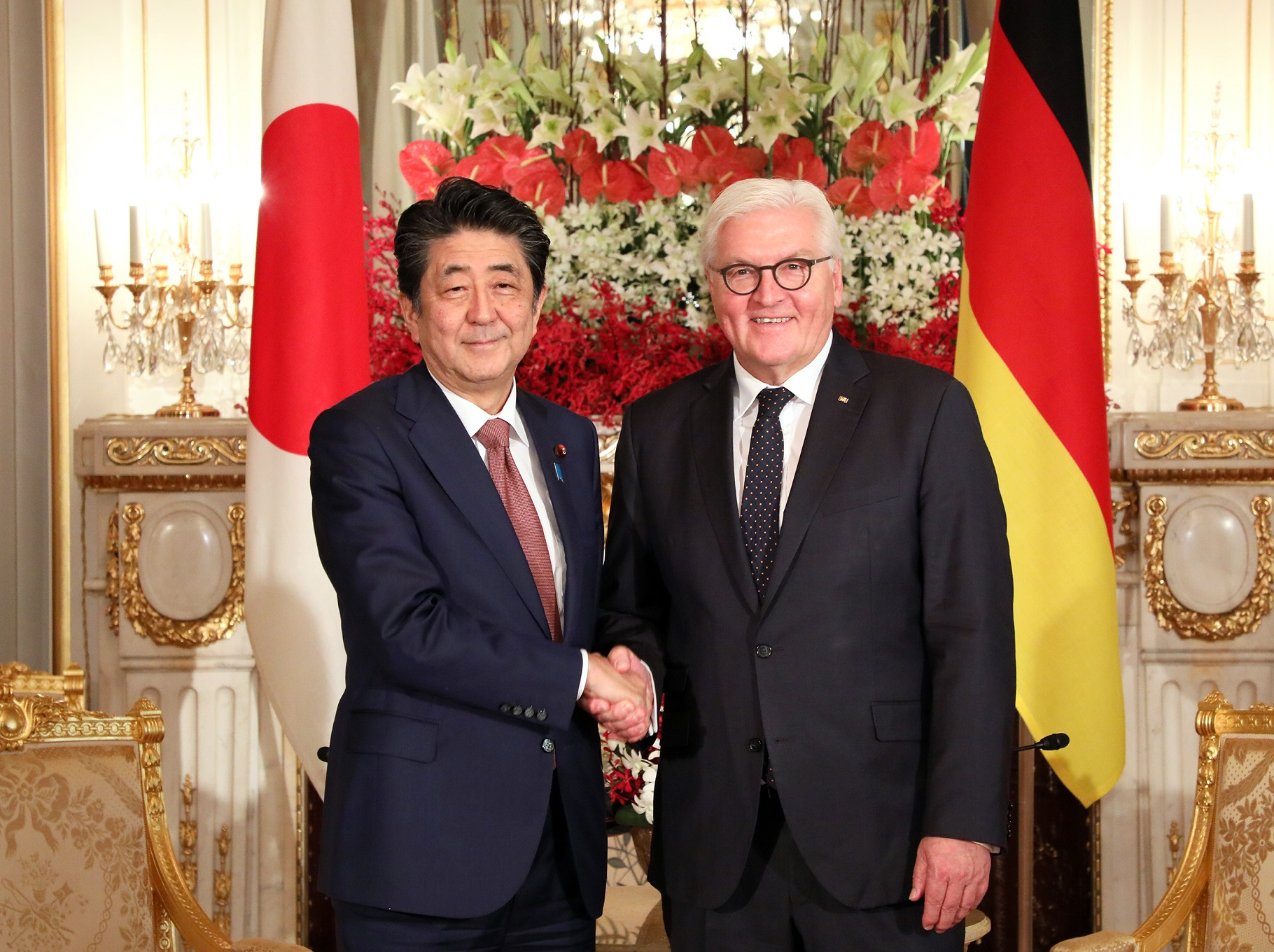
German President Frank-Walter Steinmeier during meeting with Prime Minister Abe, 2019

In the late 1990s and early 2000s, Germany and Japan, being the United Nations' second and third largest funders respectively, demanded a reform of the United Nations Security Council and an increase of the number of its permanent members. For this purpose both nations organized themselves together with Brazil and India to form the so-called "G4 nations". On 21 September 2004, the G4 issued a joint statement mutually backing each other's claim to permanent seats, together with two African countries. This proposal has found opposition in a group of countries called Uniting for Consensus. In January 2006, Japan announced that it would not support putting the G4 resolution back on the table and was working on a resolution of its own.

Certain inefficiencies with respect to the bilateral cooperation between Germany and Japan were also reflected in 2005, when former Japanese Prime Minister Kiichi Miyazawa wrote in a commemoration to the 20th anniversary of the Japanese-German Center in Berlin that

the German-Japanese relations are generally good and there are no particular bilateral problems. This results in a certain indifference, which may be considered a problem by now.

— PM Kiichi Miyazawa (2005)

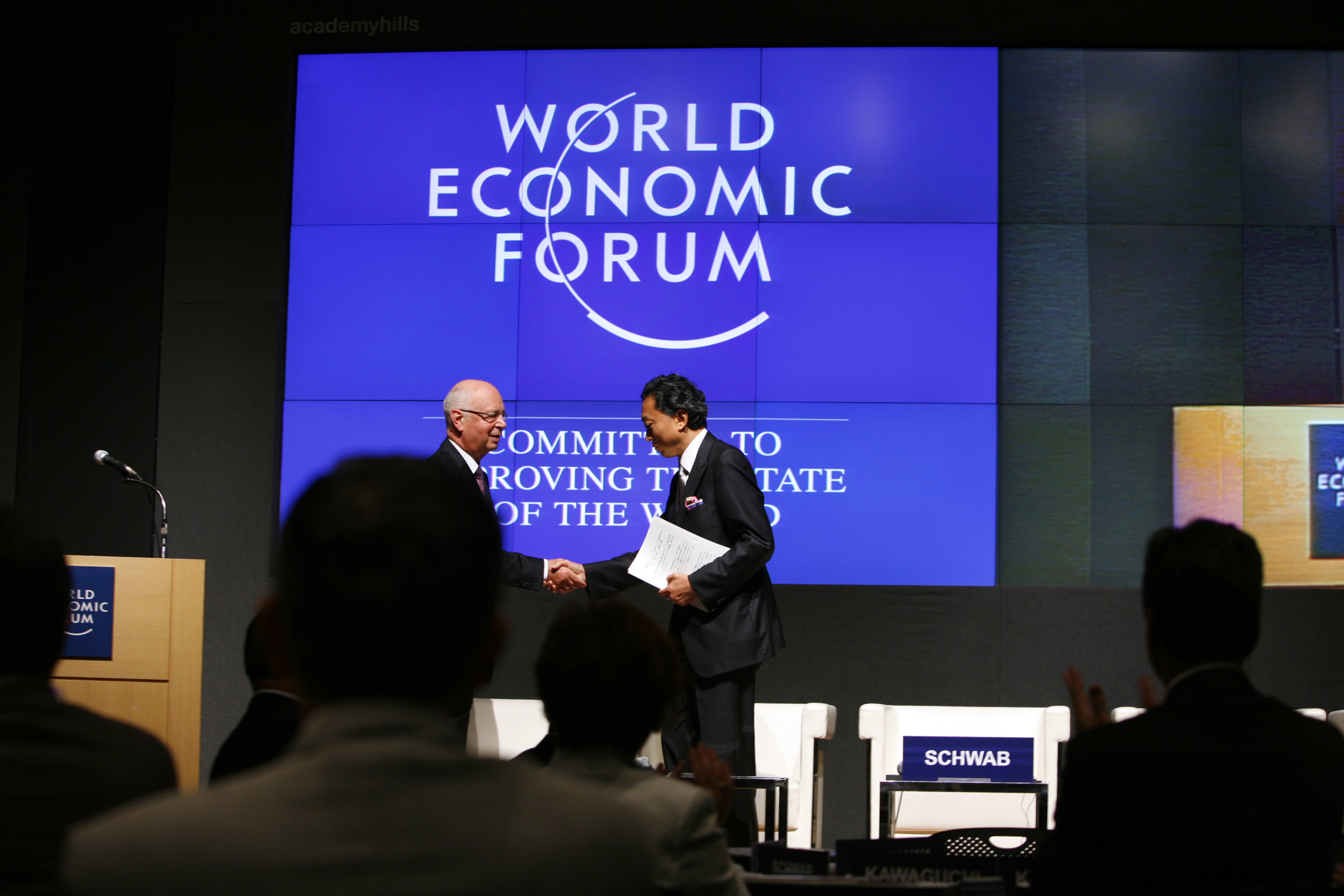
Klaus Schwab from Germany greets Japanese Prime Minister Yukio Hatoyama at the 2009 World Economic Forum.

Nevertheless, as of 2008, Japan still was Germany's second largest trading partner in Asia after China. In 2017, German imports from Japan totaled $18 billion and German exports to Japan $23 billion. In 2008, however, Japanese exports and imports to and from the European Union fell by 7.8% and 4.8% after growing by 5.8% in 2007 due to the 2008 financial crisis. Bilateral trade between Germany and Japan also shrank in 2008, with imports from Japan having dropped by 6.6% and German exports to Japan having declined by 5.5%. Despite Japan having remained Germany's principal trading partner in Asia after China in 2008, measured in terms of total German foreign trade, Japan's share of both exports and imports is relatively low and falls well short of the potential between the world's third- and fifth-largest economies.

In 2013, the top three imported cars sold in Japan are all German cars: Volkswagen, Mercedes-Benz, and BMW. In Germany, the market share of Japanese cars such as Mazda, Toyota, Honda, and Nissan is 8.6%.

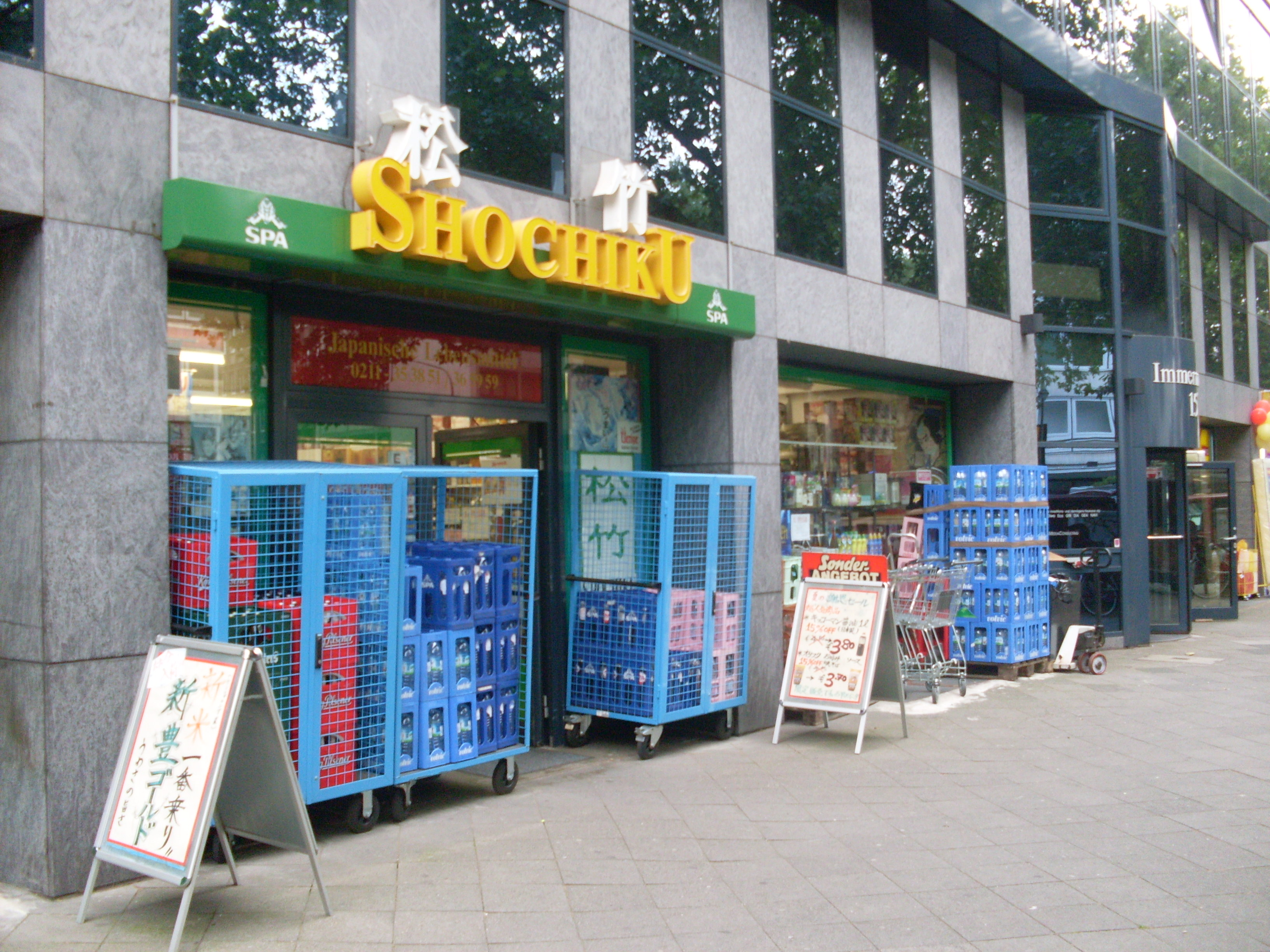
A Japanese supermarket in Düsseldorf, home of Europe's largest Japantown

Unaffected by any stagnating German-Japanese trade relations, the Japanese community in Düsseldorf, home to Europe's largest Japantown, is growing again after a decline in the 1980s and 1990s. In 2008, over 8000 Japanese lived in the Düsseldorf area, which features a Japanese school, two kindergartens, three libraries and numerous Japanese clubs. Moreover, over 200 Japanese companies are active in that region, creating over 20,000 jobs. The Japanese community is widely considered a great asset for Düsseldorf. The relations between Germany and Japan are celebrated in Düsseldorf once a year on Japan Day, which is attended by an average of half a million people. Japanese schools also exists in Berlin, Frankfurt, Hamburg and Munich and Japan has a German school in Kobe and Yokohama. As of 2021, the number of Japanese residents in Germany is 42,135 and the number of German residents in Japan is 5,888.

On 14 and 15 January 2010, German foreign minister Guido Westerwelle conducted his personal inaugural visit to Japan, focusing the talks with his Japanese counterpart, Katsuya Okada, on both nation's bilateral relations and global issues. Westerwelle emphasized, that

We want to make our joint contribution towards ensuring that this decade is a decade of disarmament – not a decade of armament

— Guido Westerwelle about German-Japanese cooperation (15 January 2010)

and both ministers instructed their Ministries to draw up disarmament initiatives and strategies which Berlin and Tokyo can present to the international community together. Especially with regard to Iran's nuclear program, it was also stressed that Japan and Germany, both technically capable of and yet refraining from possessing any ABC weapons, should assume a leading role in realizing a world free of nuclear weapons and that international sanctions are considered to be an appropriate instrument of pressure. Furthermore, Westerwelle and Okada agreed to enhance cooperation in Afghanistan and to step up the stagnating bilateral trade between both countries. The visit was concluded in talks with Japan's Prime Minister Yukio Hatoyama, before which the German foreign minister visited the famous Meiji Shrine in the heart of Tokyo.

In 2011, Germany and Japan celebrated 150 years of German-Japanese relations on the occasion of the 150th anniversary of the signing of the treaty. In Germany it was celebrated with lecture events in Berlin, among other places. The Reiss-Engelhorn Museum in Mannheim also showed an exhibition. In addition, two special stamps were issued by the German and Japanese post offices for this occasion: the "Regensburg Cathedral" and the "Yakushi-ji Temple". On the German side, the Japanese motif at 55 cents was intended for domestic traffic and the German motif at 75 cents for international traffic.

The Japanese post office printed the motifs with the corresponding postage and even printed additional stamps with German motifs for the occasion. While the Japanese stamps have the heading "150 years of friendship between Germany and Japan" in German and Japanese, the German side limited itself to the note "UNESCO World Heritage Site". A commemorative event was at the National Museum of Japanese History in Sakura in 2015, which opened an exhibition entitled "What connects Germany and Japan – 150 years of friendship between Germany and Japan". The exhibition, for which a catalog was published, was held in the Museum of History and Culture in Nagasaki, the German House in Naruto, and in other locations around Japan.

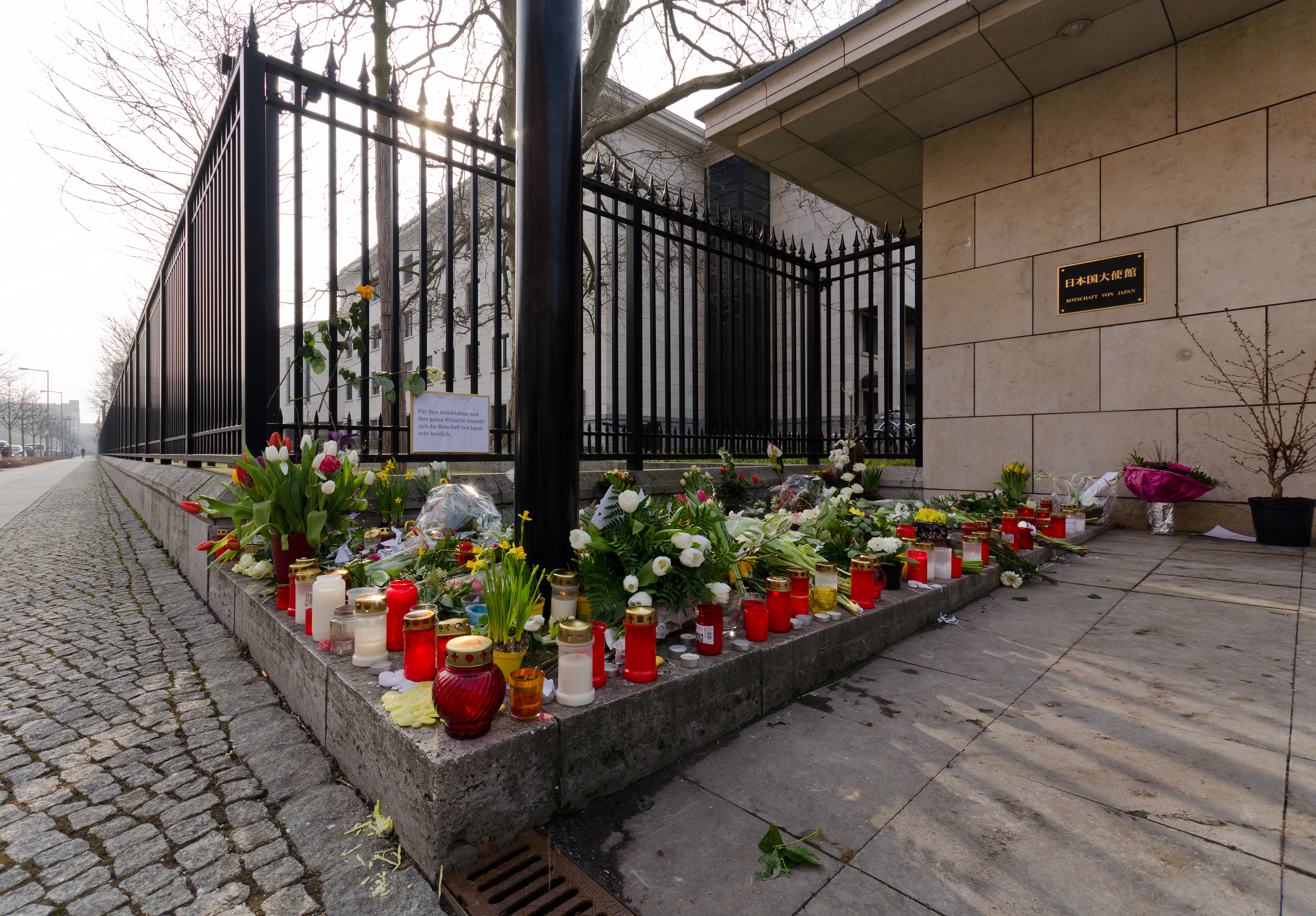
The devastating Tōhoku earthquake and tsunami in 2011 caused a wave of sympathy and compassion in Germany (flowers in front of the Japanese embassy in Berlin).

On Friday 11 March 2011, the Tōhoku earthquake and tsunami, the most powerful known earthquake to hit Japan at the time, and one of the five most powerful recorded earthquakes of which Japanese Prime Minister Naoto Kan said, "In the 65 years after the end of World War II, this is the toughest and the most difficult crisis for Japan." hit Honshu. The earthquake and the resulting tsunami not only devastated wide coastal areas in Miyagi Prefecture but also caused the Fukushima Daiichi nuclear disaster triggering a widespread permanent evacuation surrounding the Fukushima I Nuclear Power Plant. German chancellor Angela Merkel immediately expressed her deepest sympathy to all those affected and promised Japan any assistance it would call for. As a consequence rescue specialists from the Technisches Hilfswerk as well as a scout team of I.S.A.R. Germany (International Search and Rescue) were sent to Japan, however parts of the German personnel had to be recalled due to radiation danger near the damaged power plant. Furthermore, the German Aerospace Center provided TerraSAR-X- and RapidEye-satellite imagery of the affected area. In the days after the disaster, numerous flowers, candles and paper cranes were placed in front of the Japanese embassy in Berlin by compassionates, including leading German politicians. Though never materialised, additional proposals for aid included sending special units of the German Bundeswehr to Japan, as the German Armed Forces' decontamination equipment is among the most sophisticated in the world.

On 2 April 2011, German Foreign Minister Westerwelle visited Tokyo on an Asia voyage, again offering Japan "all help, where it is needed" to recover from the tsunami and subsequent nuclear disaster of the previous month. Westerwelle also emphasised the importance of making progress with a free trade agreement between Japan and the European Union in order to accelerate the recovery of the Japanese economy. Together with his German counterpart, Japanese foreign minister Takeaki Matsumoto also addressed potential new fields of cooperation between Tokyo and Berlin with respect to a reform of the United Nations Security Council.

According to a late 2023 Bertelsmann Foundation Poll, the Germans view Japan overwhelmingly positively, and regard that nation as less a competitor and more a partner. The Japanese views of Germany are positive as well, with 97% viewing Germany positively and only 3% viewing Germany negatively.

In the mid-2020s, Germany and Japan have increased high-level defence dialogues and military staff exchanges, alongside growing cooperation in emerging defence technologies such as cyber security, unmanned systems, and maritime surveillance, with Berlin providing military support to Ukraine in response to Russia's invasion and Tokyo increasingly concerned about security threats from China and North Korea.

== Cultural exchange ==
Japan is one of the most important exporters of electronics and entertainment products for Germany, with many well-known Japanese technology companies being prominent in the German market. Germany exports mainly include luxury vehicles and other mechanical engineering services to Japan, with German automobiles being more than 70% of imported foreign cars.

Japanese loanwords come mainly from English, French, Portuguese, Dutch and German. The cultural exchange between the two countries is promoted with over 800 bilateral university collaborations. In addition, Germans have felt a sense of affinity at the grassroots level due to common national traits such as hard work, meticulousness, and organisation. Germany is one of the most popular European travel destinations for Japanese people. Japanese gardens can be found in many German cities. There are also many other pro-German cultural figures who, although not connected to their work, have declared themselves to be German lovers or nerds, such as well-known rakugo performer Kokontei Shincho.

=== Literature and music ===
Classical German literature, language and culture are also dealt with in Japan. For example, there are several branches of the Goethe Institute in Japan and the Goethe Archive in Tokyo. In modern literature, many literary figures have been influenced by German literature since Mori Ōgai, and the lineage of pro-German cultural figures continues, with people in medicine, philosophy, and economics who were strongly influenced by the German school. This is even more noticeable in music, where Japan has greatly enjoyed German music for a long time. Although it has become somewhat more diverse in modern times, Japan is still a country with a strong ethos of worshiping German music and musicians, along with Britain and France.

=== Anime and manga ===
Even in subcultures such as anime and manga, German characters or characters with German-like names and Germany-inspired settings often appear, and in girls' manga, Germany is the second most frequently featured country after France. In Japan, themes from German, Austrian and Swiss literature are often taken up. A well-known example of this is Heidi, which is why many Japanese are also familiar with the Alpine region and it is a popular tourist destination. In addition, there is a tendency for villains with Nazi motifs to often appear in action works. Anime and manga form a significant part of the German animated film and comic market and show a growing fan community. Both media came to Germany through the mutual media association in the 1970s and have had greater success since the 1990s. The German manga market is now the third largest market in Europe after France and Italy.

=== Sports ===
In football, West Germany had a very strong influence on Japan. Dettmar Cramer, who was invited as a coach to strengthen the Japanese men's national team in preparation for the 1964 Tokyo Olympics, which led Japan to the top eight at the tournament, and key players such as Kunishige Kamamoto, who received his guidance, also participated. He subsequently won a bronze medal at the 1968 Summer Olympics. In addition, Cramer's recommendations, such as the creation of the Japan Soccer League and the strengthening of the training age group, became the foundation of the Japanese football world, and Cramer, who was hailed as the "Father of Japanese Football," was the first recipient of the Japan Football Hall of Fame.

The "Golden Plan,'' a comprehensive development plan for sports facilities drawn up by the West German government in 1960, was the envy of Japanese sports leaders, and the philosophy of "creating a comprehensive sports club rooted in the local community'' was established in 1991. It was incorporated into the Japan Professional Football League. Pierre Littbarski, who joined Jeff Ichihara as a star player in the J League's early days and was a member of the West Germany national team that won the World Cup in Italy, went on to build a career as a player and coach in Japan. Guido Buchwald, who won the World Cup in Italy with Littbarski, later became a player and manager for the Urawa Red Diamonds. On the other hand, since Yasuhiko Okudera joined 1.FC Köln in 1977, there have been Japanese players who have played in the Bundesliga, Germany's professional football league, and many players have moved to the league in recent years. Okudera, Makoto Hasebe, and Shinji Kagawa have also won the league's first division. At the 2022 World Cup, the Germany national team was placed in Group E along with the Japanese national team, and played against the Japanese national team on 23 November, ending with a 2-1 victory for Japan.

Japanese martial arts such as karate and judo are also popular in Germany.

== Twin towns ==
Many German and Japanese cities and towns are in partnership.

- Akita ↔ Passau
- Amagasaki ↔ Augsburg
- Arita ↔ Meissen
- Tokyo – Bunkyō ↔ Kaiserslautern
- Hachiōji ↔ Wriezen
- Hagi ↔ Ühlingen-Birkendorf
- Higashiōsaka ↔ Mitte (Berlin)
- Hiroshima ↔ Hanover
- Ichikawa ↔ Rosenheim
- Inuyama ↔ Sankt Goarshausen
- Iruma ↔ Wolfratshausen
- Kahoku ↔ Meßkirch
- Kameoka ↔ Knittelfeld
- Kawagoe ↔ Offenbach am Main
- Kumamoto ↔ Heidelberg
- Kusatsu, Gunma ↔ Bietigheim-Bissingen
- Kyoto ↔ Cologne
- Marugame ↔ Willich
- Matsuyama ↔ Freiburg im Breisgau
- Nagahama ↔ Augsburg
- Nagaoka ↔ Trier
- Naruto ↔ Lüneburg
- Niiza ↔ Neuruppin
- Osaka ↔ Hamburg
- Ōtsu ↔ Würzburg
- Sapporo ↔ Munich
- Shijōnawate ↔ Meerbusch
- Tokyo – Shinjuku ↔ Mitte (Berlin)
- Tokyo ↔ Berlin
- Tosu ↔ Zeitz
- Tottori ↔ Hanau
- Tsukuba ↔ Bochum
- Uchiko ↔ Rothenburg ob der Tauber

== See also ==
- Baruto no Gakuen
- German–Japanese industrial co-operation before and during World War II
- History of Germany
- History of Japan
- Japanese people in Germany
- List of ambassadors of Germany to Japan
- List of Japanese ministers, envoys and ambassadors to Germany
- Category:German expatriates in Japan
- Category:Foreign relations of the Empire of Japan (Japanese version)
- Category:Foreign relations of the State of Japan (Japanese version)
