= Petra Sigmund =

German diplomat

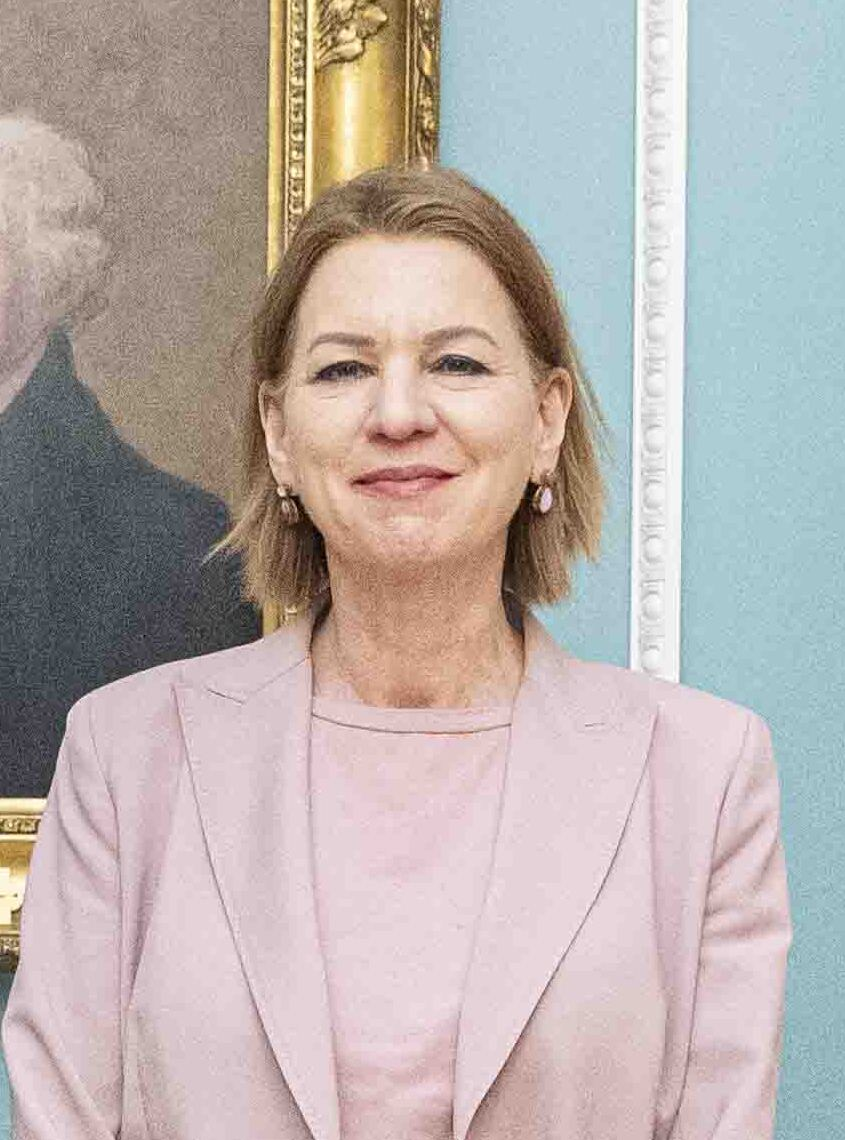
Sigmund, 2024

Petra Sigmund is a German diplomat. She is the Director General for East Asia, Southeast Asia and the Pacific at the Federal Foreign Office. She is the German ambassador to Japan since 2024.

== Biography ==
Sigmund studied sinology, political science, and economics at the Free University of Berlin and Renmin University of China. She speaks English, French and Chinese Mandarin. She is married to Peter Löffelhardt.

After joining the German Foreign Service in 1994, Petra Sigmund worked at the German Embassy in Brussels from 1998 to 2001 and the Federal Foreign Office in Berlin from 2001 to 2004. Subsequently, she directed the Trade Promotion Office at the German Embassy in Beijing from 2004 to 2006. In 2006, Sigmund returned to Berlin to serve as Head of Division for relations with EU member states, EU enlargement and EU-relations with non-European countries at the German Federal Chancellery for four years. From 2010 to 2013, Sigmund worked at the German Embassy in Paris. Returning to Berlin in 2013, she first served as the director of the Division for France and Benelux until 2015 and then as the director of the East Asia Division until 2017.

From 2017 to 2019, Sigmund was Commissioner for East Asia, Southeast Asia and the Pacific. In September 2019, Sigmund assumed the post of Director General for East Asia, Southeast Asia and the Pacific at the Federal Foreign Office.
