= Knabrostræde 5 =

Building in Copenhagen, Denmark

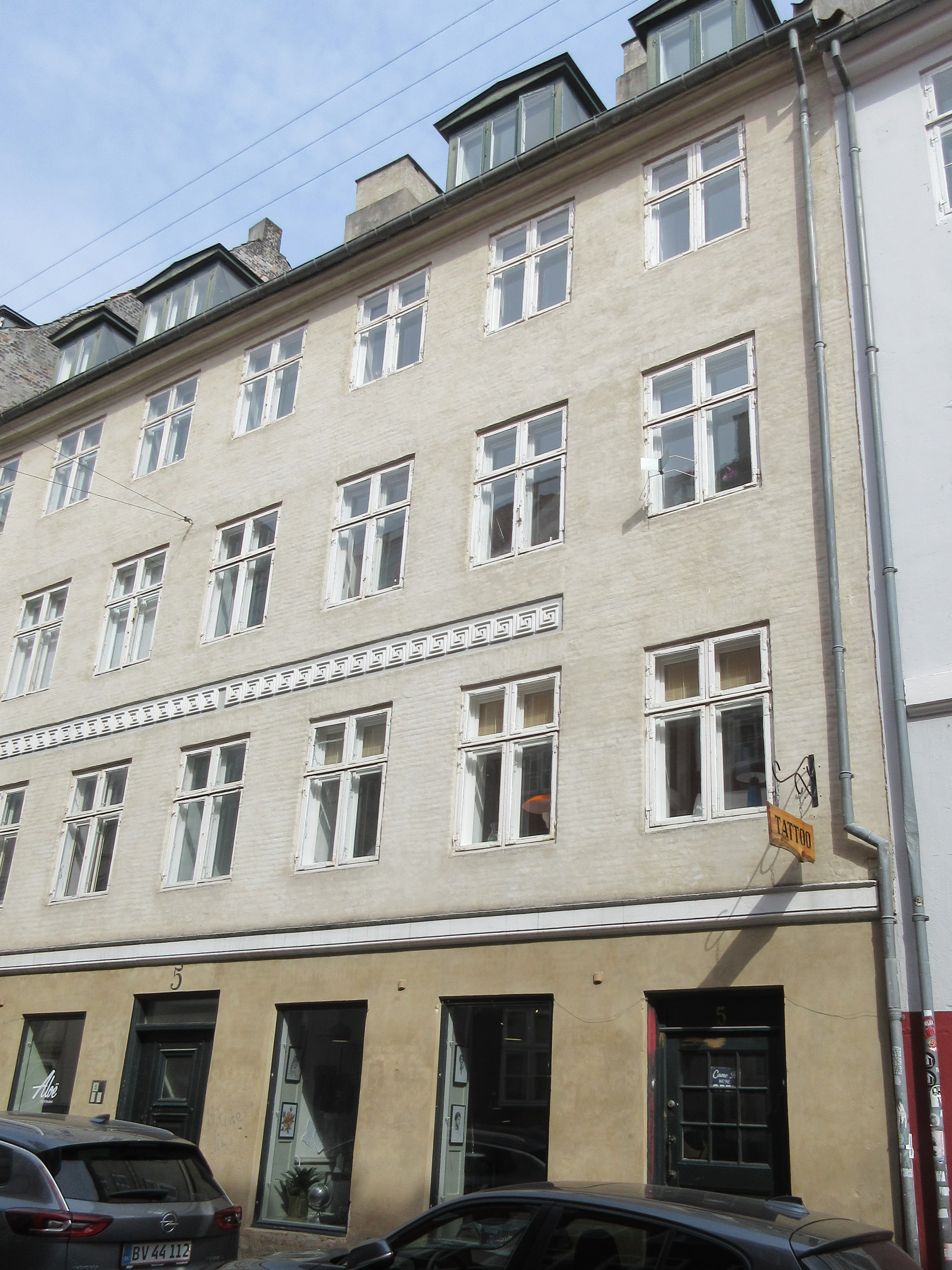
- Interactive map of the Knabrostræde 5 area

General information
- Location: Copenhagen, Denmark
- Coordinates: 55°40′37.06″N 12°34′33.02″E
- Completed: 1800

Design and construction
- Architect: Johan Martin Qvist

Knabrostræde 5 is a Neoclassical property located in the Old Town of Copenhagen, Denmark. It was listed on the Danish registry of protected buildings and places in 1986. Lorenz von Stein resided in the building as a lodger with a widow on the second floor during his short spell as a volunteer in the Schleswig Holsten Lauenborgske Cancellie.

== History ==
The buildings at the site were destroyed in the Copenhagen Fire of 1795. The current building was constructed in 1798-1800 for the merchants Michael Pedersen Kierkegaard (1756-1838) and Mads Nielsen Røjen (died 1827). Kiergegaard's wife, Kirstine Nielsdatter, Royen's sister, had died in 1806. He was later married to Ane Sørensdatter Lund, who had served as a maid in the household, by whom he became the father of the philosopher Søren Kierkegaard, but the family had by then moved to a now demolished building on Nytorv.

The property in Knabrostrædewas was in the new cadastre of 1806 listed as Snaren's Quarter, No. 116. At the time of the 1840 census, No. 116 was home to a total of 36 people. The jurist Herman Ditlev Othello von Schvaneflygel Kühne (1809-1876) resided with his wife, two daughters, mother and sister in the apartment on the third floor to the left. Pauline Chatarine Schurnoff (1796-), a widow, shared the apartment on the third floor to the right with her three unmarried children (aged 19–27) and two lodgers. Joiner Marcos Andreas Wichmann (1802-) and his wife Wilhelmine Adolphine (1805-) resided with a niece, lodger and maid in the apartment on the second floor to the left. Johannes Frantz Fritsche (1799-), a wine merchant and member of the city's Catholic congregation, resided with his wife, four children, a lodger and a maid on the second floor to the right as well as the ground floor to the right. Anna Magdalene von Scholtenm (1791-1855), a widow, resided with her two children in the apartment on the first floor to the left. The son Hans Rudolph von Scholten (1816-1895) would later serve as mayor of Hillerød from 1869. Hennericke Marie Schreiber, another widow, resided with her three unmarried children (aged 26-28) and a lodger in the apartment on the first floor to the left. The lodger was the German jurist Lorenz von Stein (born 1815), then a volunteer in the Schleswig Holsten Lauenborgske Cancellie, who would the following year continue to Paris to continue his studies.

Søren Sebastian Opetius (1772-1845), a retired ship captain, resided with his wife and mother-in-law in the apartment on the ground floor to the left.

With the introduction of house numbering in Copenhagen in 1859, Snaren's Quarter, No. 116 became Knabrostræde 5.

== Architecture ==
The building consists of four storeys over a raised cellar and is seven bays wide. A meander frieze is seen under the three central windows on the second floor and the facade is finished by a cornice under the roof. The main entrance is located in the central bay and two entrances for the commercial spaces in the ground floor are located in the outer bays. The red tile roof is penetrated by two chimneys. It features four newer dormer windows towards the street.
