= Kaneko Kentarō =

Japanese politician, diplomat, and legal scholar (1853-1942)

Junior First Rank Count Kaneko Kentarō
- 金子 堅太郎
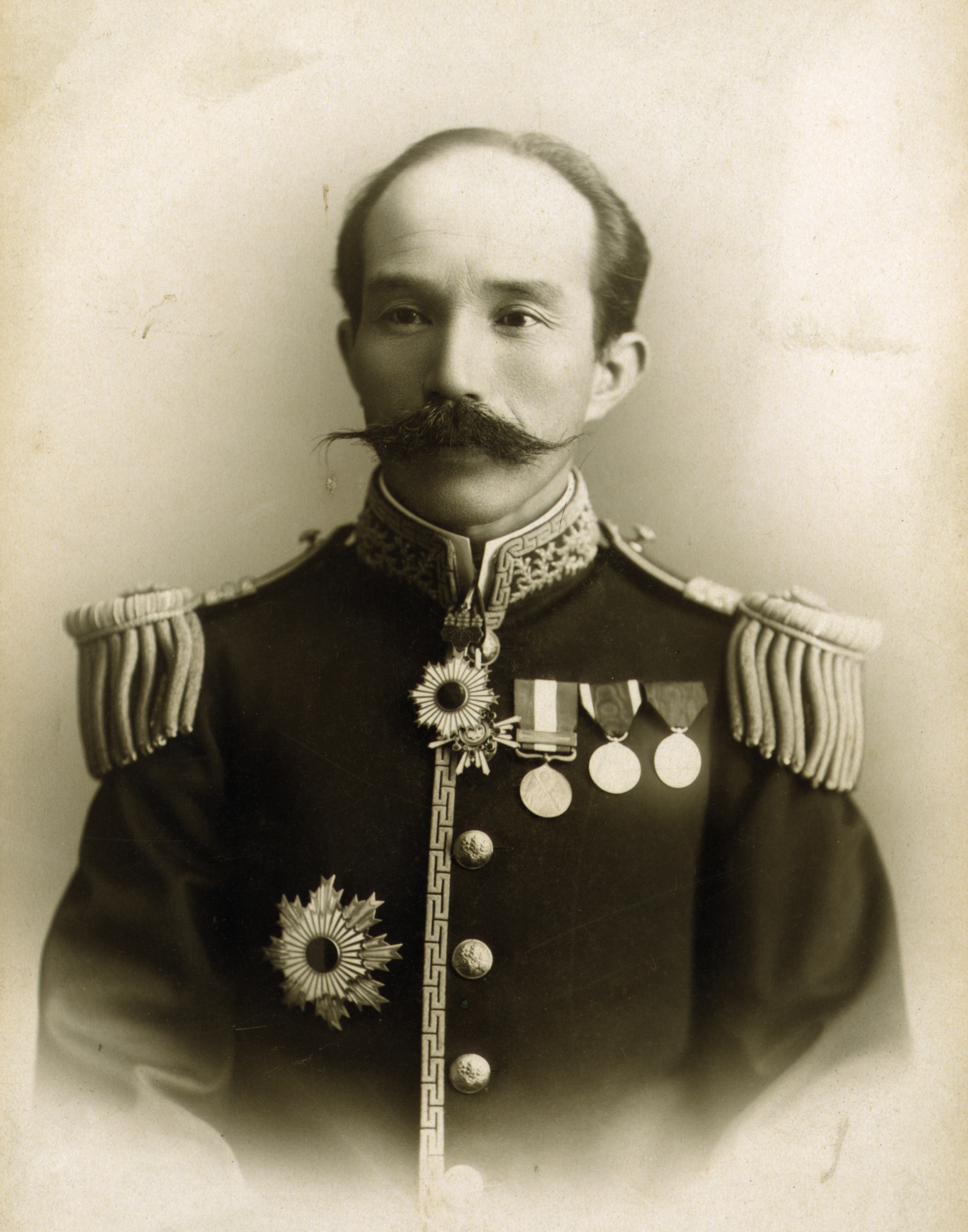
- c. 1905 photograph by Maruki Riyō

Minister of Justice
- In office 19 October 1900 – 2 June 1901
- Prime Minister: Itō Hirobumi
- Preceded by: Kiyoura Keigo
- Succeeded by: Kiyoura Keigo

Minister of Agriculture and Commerce
- In office 26 April 1898 – 30 June 1898
- Prime Minister: Itō Hirobumi
- Preceded by: Itō Miyoji
- Succeeded by: Ōishi Masami

Member of the Privy Council
- In office 9 January 1906 – 16 May 1942
- Monarchs: Meiji; Taishō; Hirohito

Member of the House of Peers
- In office 18 April 1894 – 23 January 1906 Nominated by the Emperor
- In office 29 September 1890 – 17 November 1891 Nominated by the Emperor

Personal details
- Born: 4 February 1853 Sawara, Chikuzen, Japan
- Died: 16 May 1942 (aged 89) Hayama, Kanagawa, Japan
- Party: Independent
- Relatives: Dan Takuma (brother-in-law)
- Education: Fukuoka Domain Shuyukan; Harvard University (LLB)
- Nickname: Naotsugu (childhood name)

Count Kaneko Kentarō (金子 堅太郎, Kentarō Kaneko; 4 February 1853 – 16 May 1942) was a statesman, diplomat, and legal scholar in Meiji period Japan.

A graduate of Harvard Law School, he drew on his connections in the American legal community over the course of his long career in Japanese government, particularly in his role helping to draft the new Meiji Constitution (Imperial Japanese Constitution). During the Russo-Japanese War, he engaged in promotion activities in the United States and contributed to Japan's victory.

Kaneko was one of the most influential proponents of a Japanese-American alliance in Imperial Japan. In his later years, he opposed and worked to avoid the Pacific War, but his attempts failed.

He was the first person to translate Edmund Burke into Japanese and is considered the first Burkean conservative in Japan.

== Early life ==
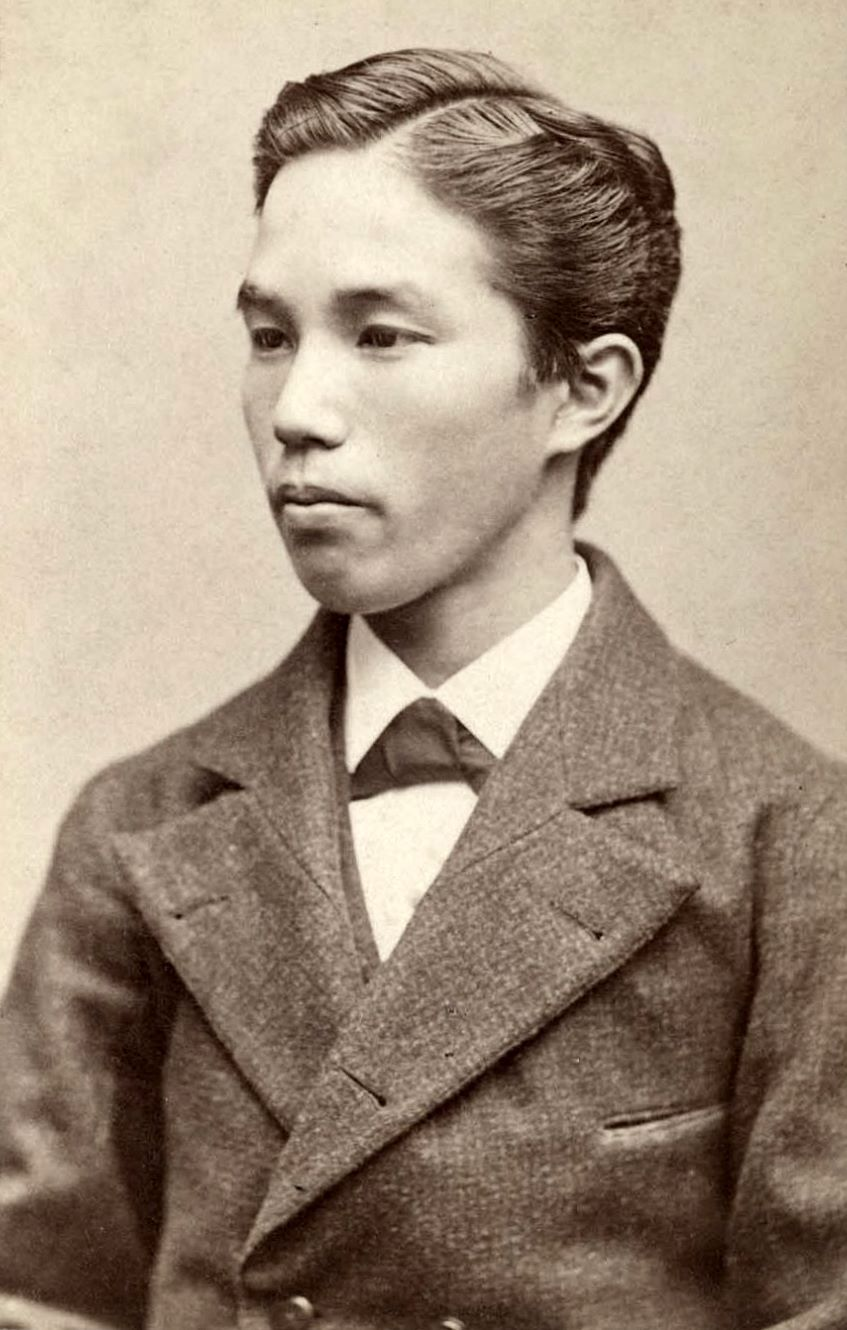
Kaneko as a teenager

Kaneko was born into a samurai family of Fukuoka Domain (Chikuzen Province's Sawara district, present-day Chūō-ku, Fukuoka), being the son of Kaneko Naomichi (1821-1876), leader of the Ansei Expedition to the Philippines in 1855. At the age of 9, he began his studies at the Shuyukan Han school. At 19, he was selected as a student member of the Iwakura Mission, and journeyed to the United States. He remained there while the rest of the mission continued on to Europe, with the instruction to obtain an education in any subject. At first, seeking a naval career, he planned to attend the United States Naval Academy in Maryland, but a doctor assessed his physical fortitude as insufficient and discouraged any military pursuit. Instead, Kaneko decided to seek a legal education, enrolling at Harvard University in 1876. He prepared for the challenging curriculum by seeking out the personal tutelage of future Supreme Court Justice Oliver Wendell Holmes Jr. At Harvard, Kaneko shared lodgings with fellow Japanese student and future fellow-diplomat Komura Jutarō. He also developed a wide circle of contacts in America, including lawyers, scientists, journalists, and industrialists.

While at Harvard, Kaneko and Komura visited the home of Alexander Graham Bell and spoke on an experimental telephone with a fellow Japanese student, Izawa Shunji. According to Bell, this was the first instance of any language besides English being spoken into the new invention.

After graduating from Harvard in 1878, Kaneko returned to Japan as a lecturer at the University of Tokyo.

== Government career ==
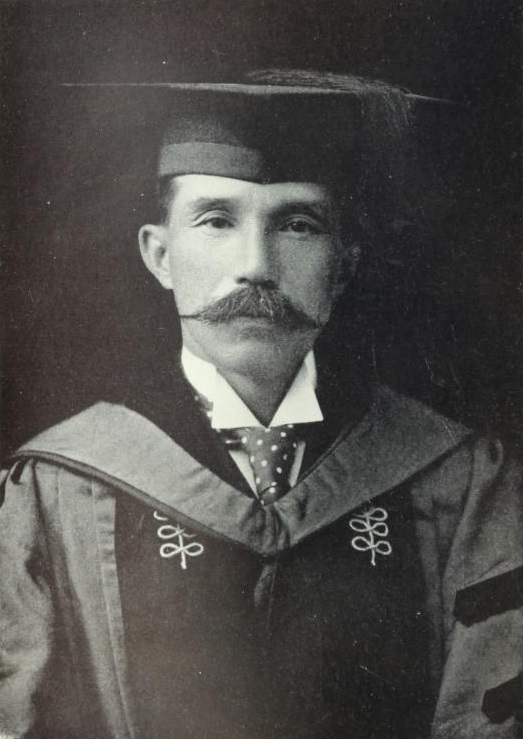
Kaneko in his Harvard doctoral cap and gown

In 1880, Kaneko was appointed as a secretary in the Genrōin, and in 1884 had joined the Office for Investigation of Institutions, the body organized by the Genrōin to study the constitutions of various western nations with the aim of creating a western-style constitution for Japan. The Meiji Constitution that was the product of this was promulgated by the Emperor in 1889. Kaneko worked closely with Itō Hirobumi, Inoue Kowashi and Itō Miyoji, and became personal secretary to Itō Hirobumi when the latter became first Prime Minister of Japan. Kaneko was appointed to the House of Peers of the Diet of Japan in 1890, becoming its first secretary. He was subsequently appointed as Vice Minister, then briefly Minister of Agriculture and Commerce in 1898 in the third Itō administration. He was awarded an honorary doctorate (LL.D.) by Harvard in 1899 for his work on the Meiji Constitution.

Perhaps influenced by his own experiences, Kaneko actively promoted the value and necessity of education. His childhood primary school, Shuyukan, having closed in 1871, Kaneko campaigned the Fukuoka regional government to reopen the school and raised funds in support. In 1885, it was reopened as an English vocational school, with all classes held in English. In 1889, Kaneko became the first president of Nihon Law School (now Nihon University), a post he held until 1893.

In 1891, Kaneko was elected to the prestigious Institute of International Law, traveling to its general meeting in Geneva the next year as part of his campaigning to revise the unequal treaties Japan had signed during its forced "opening" in the late 1850s.

In 1900, Kaneko was appointed as Minister of Justice under the fourth Itō administration and was made baron (danshaku) in the kazoku peerage system in 1907.

== Russo-Japanese War ==
In 1904, during the Russo-Japanese War, at the personal request of Itō Hirobumi, Kaneko returned to the United States as a special envoy from the Japanese government to enlist American diplomatic support in bringing the war to a speedy conclusion. Kaneko embarked on a public-relations blitz, publishing editorials in various periodicals and delivering speeches. In April 1904, Kaneko addressed the Japan Club of Harvard University, delivering the tailored message that Japan was fighting to maintain the peace of Asia and to conserve the influence of Anglo-American civilization in the East. While in the United States, Kaneko revived contacts with Theodore Roosevelt, with whom he had been contemporaneously at Harvard (though they did not meet until later, introduced by William Sturgis Bigelow in 1889), and requested that Roosevelt help Japan mediate a peace treaty. When Kaneko met Roosevelt, the president asked for a book that would help explain the character of the Japanese people—what motivates them, their culture and spiritual education in Japan. Kaneko gave Roosevelt a copy of 'Bushido', and several months later, Roosevelt thanked Kaneko, remarking that it enlightened within him a deeper understanding of the Japanese culture and character. Thereafter, Roosevelt eagerly took on the task and presided over the subsequent Treaty of Portsmouth negotiations.

== Later career ==
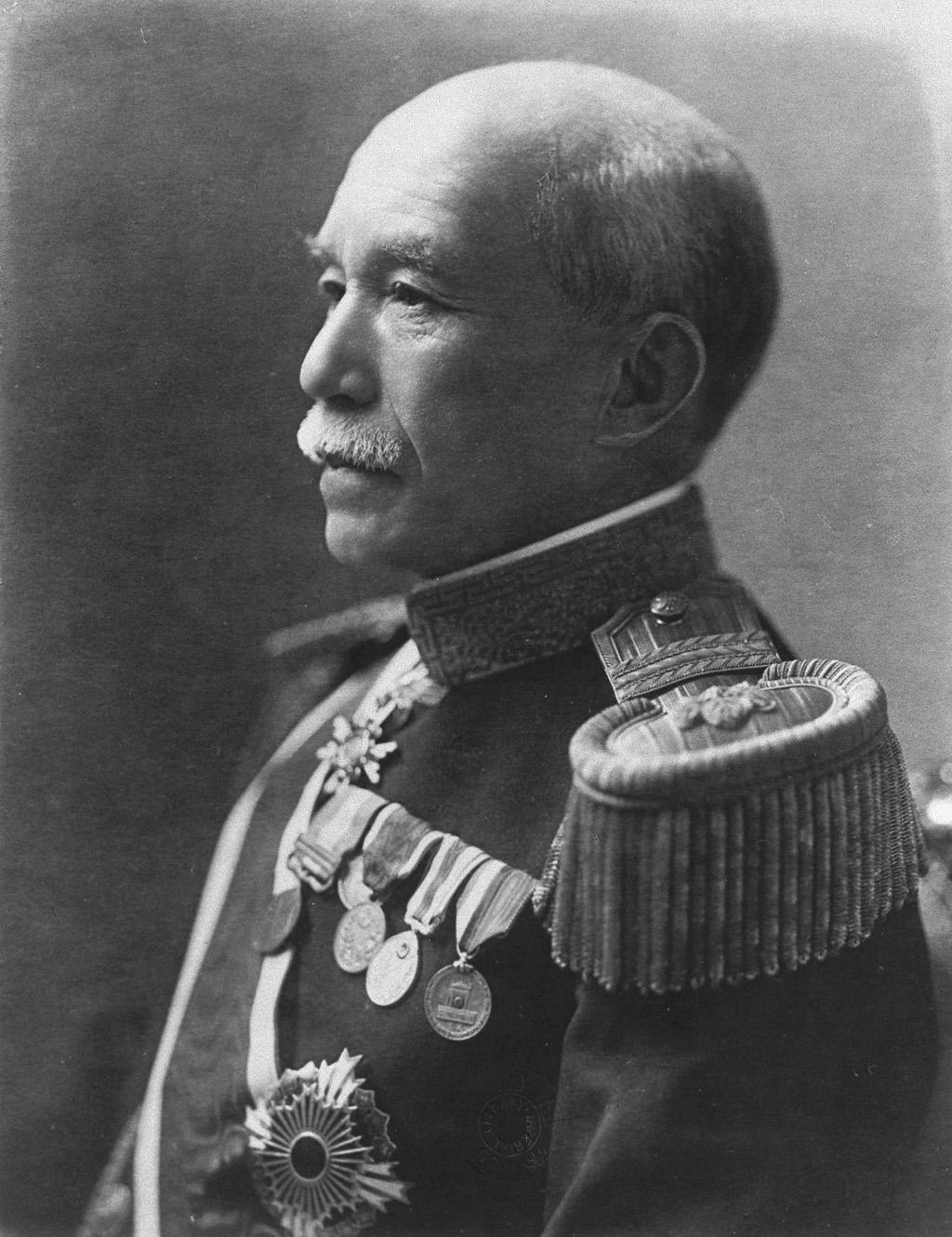
Kaneko Kentarō, before 1942

From 1906, Kaneko served as a member of the Privy Council, and was elevated in title to viscount (shishaku) in 1907.

In his later years he was engaged in the compilation of a history of the Imperial family and served as secretary general of the association for compiling historical materials about the Meiji Restoration. He completed an official biography of Emperor Meiji in 1915. He was awarded the Grand Cordon of the Order of the Rising Sun in 1928, and elevated to hakushaku (count) in 1930.

Kaneko was a strong proponent of good diplomatic relations with the United States all of his life. In 1900, he established the first American Friendship Society (米友協会, Beiyu Kyōkai).

According to the records of the America-Japan Society, Kaneko Kentaro founded that organization in Tokyo, in March 1917, and became its first president. In 1938, during a time of increasingly strident anti-American rhetoric from the Japanese government and press, he established the Japan-America Alliance Association (日米同志会, Nichibei Dōshikai), a political association calling for a "Japanese-American Alliance", together with future Prime Minister Takeo Miki. He was one of the few senior statesmen in Japan to speak out strongly against war with the United States as late as 1941.

On his death in 1942, Kaneko was posthumously awarded the Grand Cordon of the Supreme Order of the Chrysanthemum.

== Honors ==
- Grand Cordon of the Order of the Rising Sun (April 1, 1906)
- Grand Cordon of the Order of the Paulownia Flowers (November 10, 1928)
- Grand Cordon of the Order of the Chrysanthemum (May 16, 1942; posthumous)
- Junior First Rank (May 16, 1942; posthumous)

== See also ==
- Suematsu Kenchō – sent on the same mission as Kaneko in 1904 but to Europe

Political offices
Preceded by Itō Miyoji	Minister of Agriculture & Commerce; Apr 1898 – Jun 1898	Succeeded by Ōishi Masami
Preceded by Kiyoura Keigo	Minister of Justice; Oct 1900 – Jun 1901	Succeeded by Kiyoura Keigo
