= 1890 Japanese general election =

- 1 July 1890

All 300 seats in the House of Representatives 151 seats needed for a majority
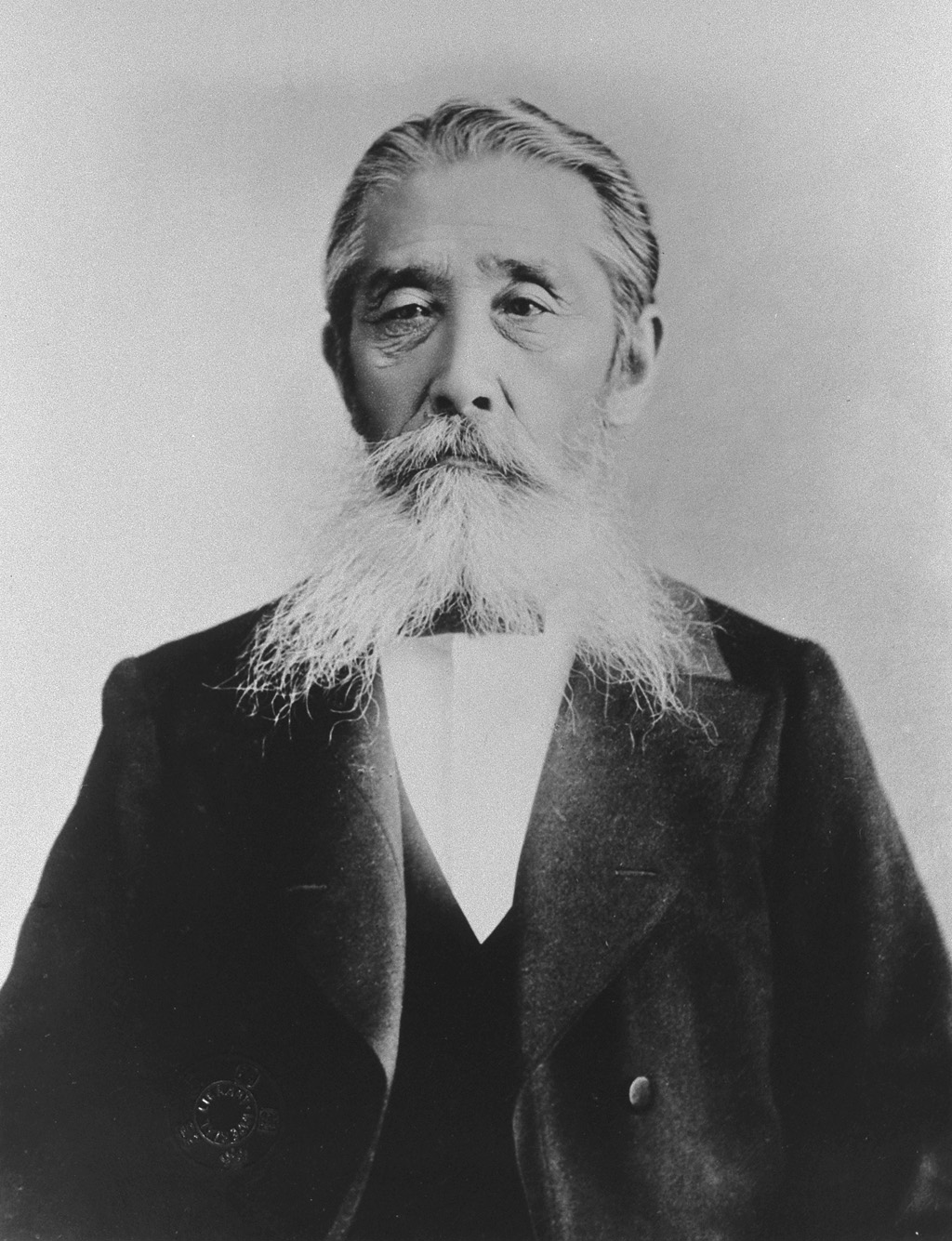

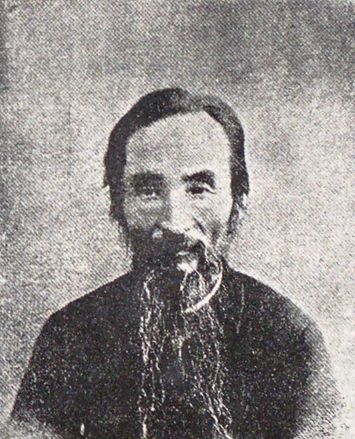

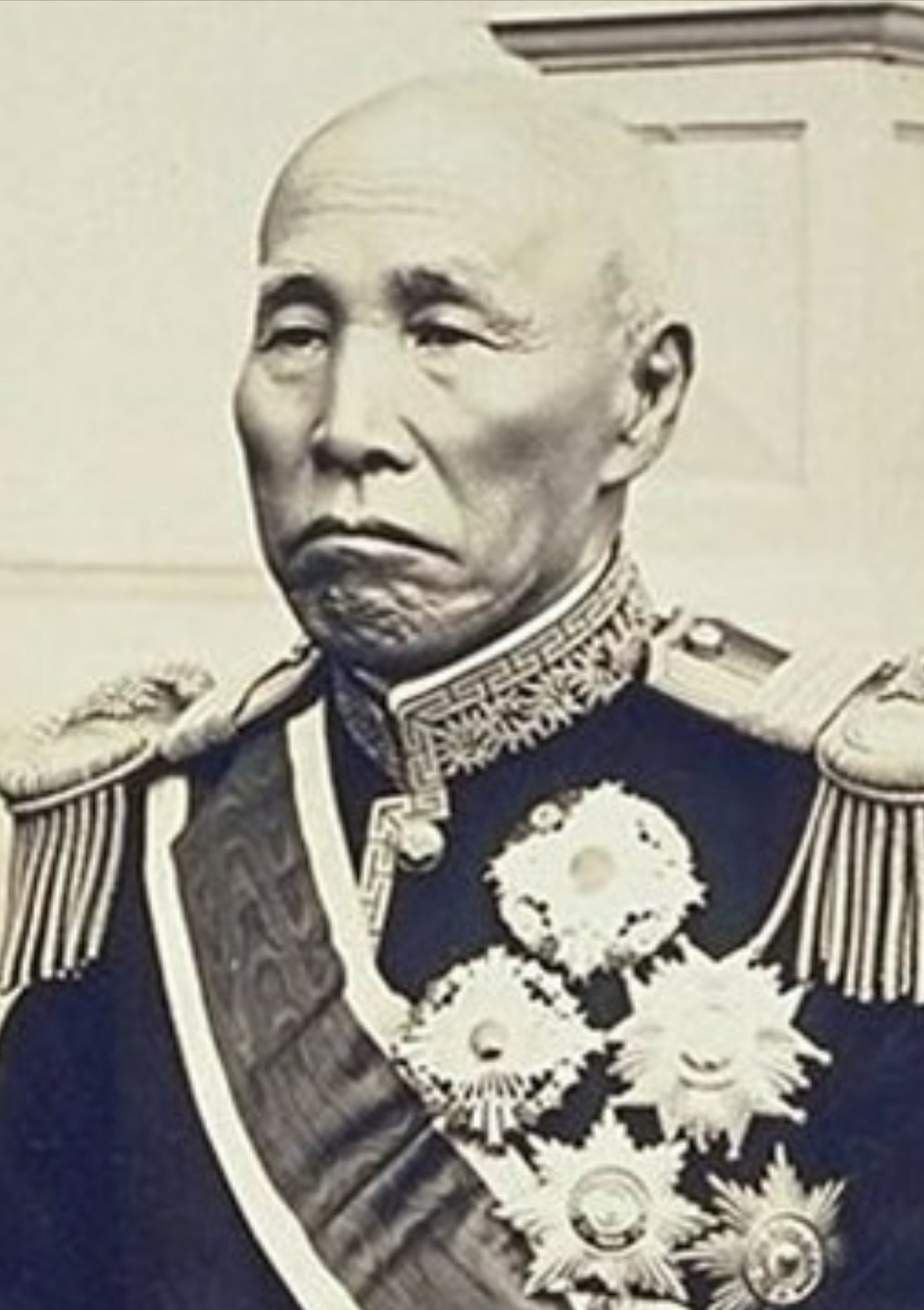
	First party	Second party
Leader	Itagaki Taisuke	Shigeyuki Masuda
Party	Liberal	Taiseikai
Seats won	130	79
	Third party	Fourth party
Leader	Ōkuma Shigenobu
Party	Rikken Kaishintō	Kokumin Jiyutō
Seats won	41	5
Prime Minister before election
Yamagata Aritomo
Independent
Prime Minister after election
Yamagata Aritomo
Independent

General elections were held in Japan for the first time on 1 July 1890. Voters elected 300 members of the House of Representatives of the Diet of Japan in what was the first example of a popularly elected national assembly in Asia (as the Ottoman Chamber of Deputies was initially elected indirectly).

== Background ==
The elections for the lower house of the Diet were held in accordance with provisions of the new Meiji Constitution, which had been promulgated in 1889.

The elections had limited suffrage, with only male citizens 25 years of age and over, who had paid 15 Japanese Yen or more in national taxes, and who had been resident in their prefecture for at least a year, qualified to vote. The number of eligible voters who met this requirement was 450,872 people out of a total Japanese population of 39,933,478 (1.13%). The high tax requirement meant that voter roles were heavily weighed towards rural landlords and urban entrepreneurs. In terms of social class, 91% were commoners, and 9% were ex-samurai. Residents of the prefectures in Honshū, Kyūshū and Shikoku participated; residents in Hokkaidō and Okinawa (as “territories”) were excluded from this election. About 95% of those eligible to vote actually cast ballots, although there was no penalty for not doing so.

Only male citizens 30 years of age and over, who were not members of the kazoku peerage or of the imperial family or its branches were allowed to become candidates for office in the lower house. The number of seats in the lower house was 300, divided into 214 single-seat districts and 43 two-seat districts, which were contested by 1,243 candidates. The election went smoothly and without violence reported.

== Results ==
Party	Votes	%	Seats
Liberal Party			130
Taiseikai			79
Rikken Kaishintō			41
Kokumin Jiyutō			5
Independents			45
Total			300
Total votes	422,594	–	
Registered voters/turnout	450,872	93.73	
Source: Statistics Bureau of Japan

=== Post-election composition by prefecture ===
Prefecture	Total seats	Seats won				
Prefecture	Total seats	Liberal	Taiseikai	Rikken Kaishintō	Kokumin Jiyutō	Ind.
Aichi	11	2	9	0	0	0
Akita	5	3	2	0	0	0
Aomori	4	4	0	0	0	0
Chiba	9	4	0	3	0	2
Ehime	7	5	0	2	0	0
Fukui	4	4	0	0	0	0
Fukuoka	9	2	5	0	0	2
Fukushima	7	2	5	0	0	0
Gifu	7	1	5	0	0	1
Gunma	5	4	1	0	0	0
Hiroshima	10	1	2	2	0	5
Hyōgo	12	6	0	5	0	1
Ibaraki	8	2	1	3	0	2
Ishikawa	6	2	0	2	1	1
Iwate	5	4	1	0	0	0
Kagawa	5	3	0	1	0	1
Kagoshima	7	7	0	0	0	0
Kanagawa	7	6	0	1	0	0
Kōchi	4	4	0	0	0	0
Kumamoto	8	2	1	0	4	1
Kyoto	7	1	5	0	0	1
Mie	7	3	1	2	0	1
Miyagi	5	1	4	0	0	0
Miyazaki	3	3	0	0	0	0
Nagano	8	5	2	0	0	1
Nagasaki	7	5	1	0	0	1
Nara	4	2	0	1	0	1
Niigata	13	9	0	3	0	1
Ōita	6	1	4	1	0	0
Okayama	8	3	4	1	0	0
Osaka	10	6	4	0	0	0
Saga	4	1	0	3	0	0
Saitama	8	4	1	2	0	1
Shiga	5	1	4	0	0	0
Shimane	6	0	5	0	0	1
Shizuoka	8	2	4	2	0	0
Tochigi	5	4	0	1	0	0
Tokushima	5	1	0	3	0	1
Tokyo	12	2	4	3	0	3
Tottori	3	0	2	0	0	1
Toyama	5	1	0	3	0	1
Wakayama	5	0	0	0	0	5
Yamagata	6	4	0	0	0	2
Yamaguchi	7	0	0	0	0	7
Yamanashi	3	0	1	0	0	2
Total	300	127	78	44	5	46
Note: Party affiliation after the general election.

== Aftermath ==
In August, all progressive parties (mintō) that won seats(Kaishintō, Kyūshū Dōshikai, Daidō Club, Jiyutō and Aikoku Kōtō) tried to negotiate a merge, but Kaishintō withdrew after Daidō Club, Jiyūtō and Aikoku Kōtō voiced against its participation. The 4 remaining parties then merged to form the Rikken Jiyutō, which in turn formed a parliamentary bloc called Yayoi Club (lit. 'March Club'). Kaishintō formed its own parliamentary bloc Giin Shūkaisho (lit. 'Assembly of Deputies') as well. On the other hand, a group of 79 deputies who called for political neutrality formed Taiseikai (lit. 'Catch-all Bloc') in August, and 5 nationalist-liberal deputies formed Kokumin Jiyutō (lit. 'National Liberal Party') in December, a few days after the first session summoned.

=== Parliamentary bloc members ===
Session	Yayoi Club	Giin Shūkaisho	Taiseikai	Kokumin Jiyutō	Jiyu Club	Tomoe Club	Dokuritsu Club	Non-Affiliated	Total
1st 29 November 1890 - 7 March 1891	130	40	79	5	0	0	0	42	296
2nd 26 November - 25 December 1891	▼92	▲44	▼52	▼0	▲25	▲17	▲19	▲51	300
