= Taiseikai =

Political party

Taiseikai (Japanese: 大成会, lit. 'Great Achievement Society') was a political party in Japan. It was active from 1890 to 1891.

== History ==
Following the July 1890 elections the Taiseikai was established by a group of 79 newly elected and pro-government National Diet members who were largely former civil servants. The second-largest party after the Rikken Jiyūtō, it was a largely pragmatic group rather than adhering to certain principles.

The party split in November 1891 over its support for the government, with a group breaking away to form the Tomoe Club, and it ceased to exist by the time of the February 1892 elections.

== Election results ==
Election	Leader	Seats	Status
1890	Shigeyuki Masuda	79 / 300	Opposition
