= Kokumin Jiyutō =

Japanese political party

Kokumin Jiyutō (国民自由党; National Liberal Party) was an ultra-nationalist political party in Japan.

== History ==
Following a failed attempt to unite the Liberal Party and Rikken Kaishintō, the National Liberal Party was established in October 1890 by five Kyushu-based members of the House of Representatives who had been elected in July. Most of the representatives had previously been members of the Daidō Club. The new party was dissolved the following year.

== Election results ==
Election	Leader	Seats	Status
1890		5 / 300	Opposition
