= Itō Miyoji =

Japanese politician

Junior First Rank Count Itō Miyoji
- 伊東 巳代治
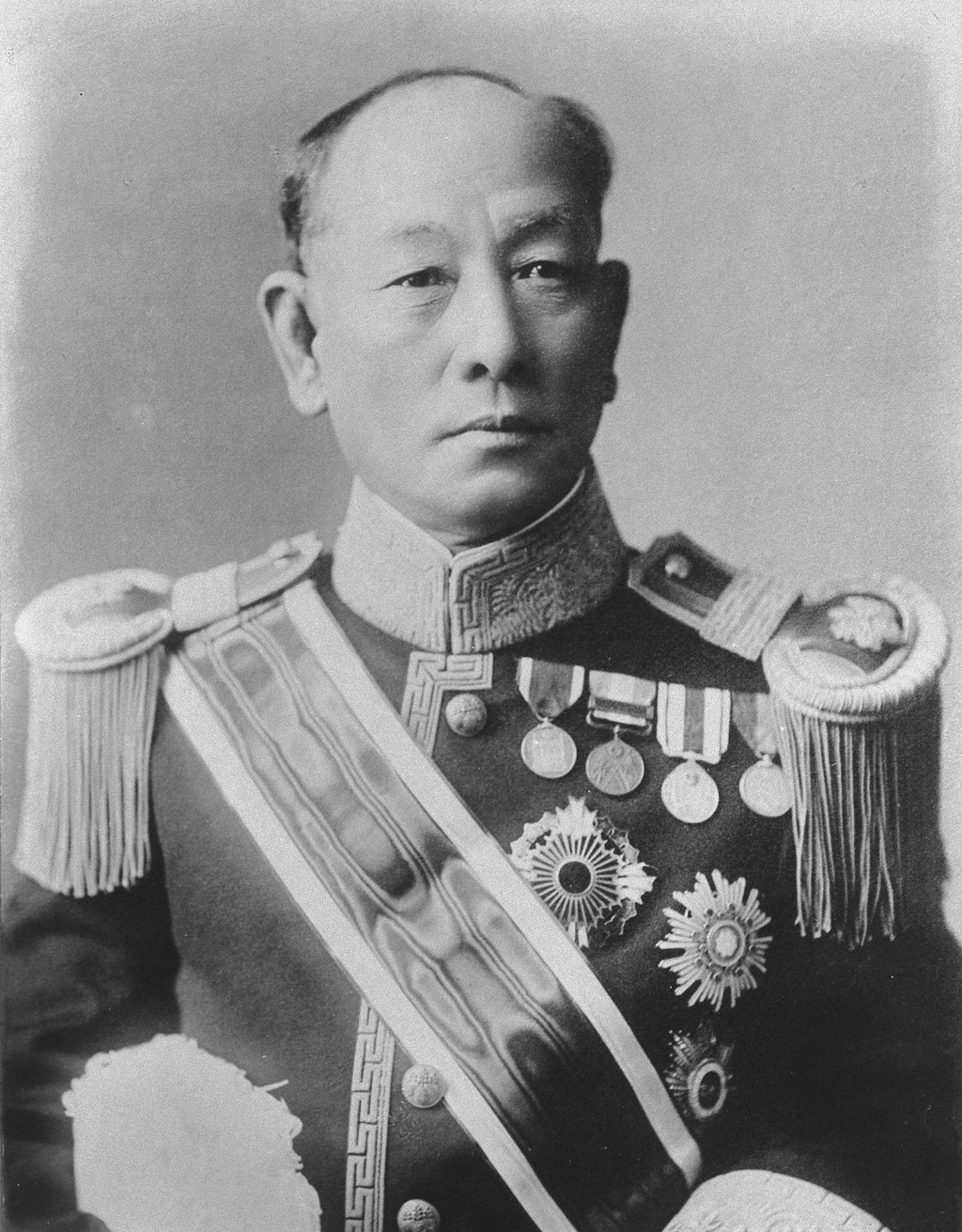
- Count Itō Miyoji

Minister of Agriculture and Commerce
- In office 12 January 1898 – 26 April 1898
- Prime Minister: Itō Hirobumi
- Preceded by: Yamada Nobumichi
- Succeeded by: Kaneko Kentarō

Chief Cabinet Secretary
- In office 8 August 1892 – 20 September 1896
- Prime Minister: Itō Hirobumi
- Preceded by: Hirayama Narinobu
- Succeeded by: Takahashi Kenzō

Member of the Privy Council
- In office 28 March 1899 – 19 February 1934
- Monarchs: Meiji; Taishō; Hirohito

Member of the House of Peers
- In office 23 January 1894 – 18 July 1899 Nominated by the Emperor
- In office 29 September 1890 – 17 November 1891 Nominated by the Emperor

Personal details
- Born: 7 May 1857 Nagasaki, Hizen, Japan
- Died: 19 February 1934 (aged 76) Kōjimachi, Tokyo, Japan
- Resting place: Tsukiji Hongan-ji

Count Itō Miyoji (伊東 巳代治; 7 May 1857 – 19 February 1934) was a Japanese statesman of the Meiji era. He was a protégé of the leading oligarch Itō Hirobumi. As cabinet secretary 1892-1898, he was a powerbroker between the oligarchy and the political powers in the Diet. He grew increasingly conservative and became a watchdog and defender of the constitution in his role as privy councillor, 1899-1934. Biographer George Akita calls him a political failure.

== Biography ==
Itō was born into a local samurai administrator's family in Nagasaki, Hizen Province (present-day Nagasaki Prefecture). From his early days, he showed a mastery of foreign languages. In the new Meiji government he worked as a translation official for Hyōgo Prefecture specializing in English, and was later selected to accompany Itō Hirobumi (no relation—the kanji characters for their names being different) to Europe in 1882 to investigate the constitutions and governmental structures of various European countries, with the aim of creating a constitution for Japan.

After his return to Japan, he assisted Inoue Kowashi and Kaneko Kentarō in drafting the Meiji Constitution, and was subsequently nominated to the House of Peers of the Diet of Japan.

In 1892, he became Chief Cabinet Secretary in Itō Hirobumi's Second Cabinet, and in 1898, served as Minister of Agriculture and Commerce under the Third Itō Cabinet.

At the same time, Itō Miyoji was also president of the pro-government newspaper, the Tokyo Nichinichi Shimbun (the predecessor to the modern Mainichi Shimbun).

From 1899, Itō Miyoji served as a member of the Privy Council. In 1907, he was ennobled with the title of danshaku (baron) under the kazoku peerage system. He was further elevated to hakushaku (count) in 1922.

In his later years, Itō was the bane of civilian government through his consistent and conservative use of the Tokyo Nichinichi Shimbun to inflame public opinion. During the Shōwa financial crisis, he brought out the collapse of the administration of Prime Minister Wakatsuki Reijirō through a virulent bad-press campaign. He also strongly criticized Prime Minister Hamaguchi Osachi for signing the London Naval Treaty on arms limitations as infringing on the direct prerogatives of the emperor.

Itō died in 1934. His grave is at Tsukiji Hongan-ji in Tokyo.

== References and further reading ==
- Akita, George. "The Other Itō: A Political Failure." in Albert Craig, ed. Personality in Japanese History (1970): 335-72.
- Gordon, Andrew. A Modern History of Japan: From Tokugawa Times to the Present. Oxford University Press, 2003. ISBN 0-19-511061-7
- Sims, Richard. Japanese Political History Since the Meiji Renovation 1868-2000. Palgrave Macmillan, 2001. ISBN 0-312-23914-9

Political offices
Preceded by Hirayama Narinobu	Chief Cabinet Secretary; 8 August 1892 – 20 September 1896	Succeeded by Takahashi Kenzō
Preceded by Yamada Nobumichi	Minister of Agriculture & Commerce; 12 January – 26 April 1898	Succeeded by Kaneko Kentarō
