= Lorenz von Stein =

German legal scholar (1815–1890)

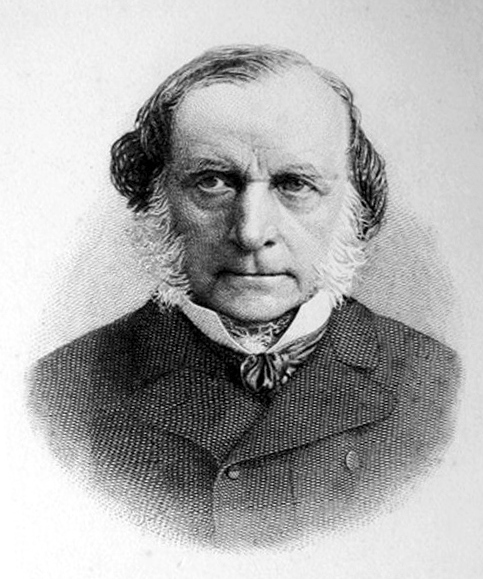
- Lorenz von Stein
- Born: 18 November 1815; Eckernförde, Schleswig, Denmark
- Died: 23 September 1890 (aged 74); Vienna, Austria-Hungary

Academic background
- Education: University of Kiel
- Influences: Marquis de Condorcet, Benjamin Constant, Robert von Mohl, Charles Fourier, G. W. F. Hegel, Henri de Saint-Simon, Jean de Sismondi

Academic work
- Discipline: Political economics
- Institutions: University of Vienna
- Notable students: Carl Menger, Theodor Herzl
- Notable ideas: Welfare state

Lorenz von Stein (18 November 1815 – 23 September 1890) was a German economist, sociologist, and public administration scholar from Eckernförde. As an advisor to Meiji period Japan, his liberal political views influenced the wording of the Constitution of the Empire of Japan as well as major constitutional thinkers such as Rudolf von Gneist.

According to Colin Gordon, Stein articulated a "vision of a liberal state as active historic partner in the making of civil society" and called for "a tabling of the question of class formation as part of the state's agenda." Stein advocated a combination of constitutional liberal state with a welfare state, and has been called the "intellectual father of the welfare state. Stein and other Hegelian liberals, such as Robert von Mohl, also had a profound influence on American progressivism.

== Biography ==
Stein was born in the seaside town of Borby in Eckernförde in Schleswig-Holstein as Wasmer Jacob Lorentz. He studied philosophy and jurisprudence at the universities of Kiel and Jena from 1835–1839, and at the University of Paris from 1841–1842. Between 1846 and 1851 Stein was an associate professor at the University of Kiel. He participated in the 1848 Revolutions and ran for election as a member of the Frankfurt Parliament. His advocacy of independence for his native Schleswig, then part of Denmark, led to his dismissal in 1852.

In 1848, Stein published a book entitled Socialist and Communist Movements since the Third French Revolution (1848) in which he introduced the term "social movement" into scholarly discussions—depicting actually in this way political movements fighting for the social rights understood as the welfare rights.

This theme was repeated in 1850, when Stein published a book titled History of the French Social Movements from 1789 to the Present (1850). For Stein, the social movement was basically understood as a movement from society to the state, created by the inequalities in the economy, making the proletariat part of politics through representation. The book was translated into the English by Kaethe Mengelberg and published by Bedminster Press in 1964 (Cahman, 1966)

From 1855, until his retirement in 1885, von Stein was a professor of Political economy at the University of Vienna. His work from that period is considered as the basis of the international science of public administration. He also influenced the practice of public finance.

In 1882, Japanese Prime Minister of Japan Itō Hirobumi headed a delegation to Europe to study western governmental systems. The delegation went first to Berlin, where they were instructed by Rudolf von Gneist, and then Vienna, where Stein was lecturing at the University of Vienna. As with Gneist, Stein's message to the Japanese delegation was that universal suffrage and party politics should be avoided. Stein held that the state was above society, and that the purpose of the state was to bring about social reform, which was implemented from the monarchy down to the common people.

However, Stein is best known for the fact that he applied Hegel's dialectic to the area of public administration and the national economy, in order to improve the systematics of these sciences, although he did not neglect the historical aspects.

Stein analyzed the class state of his time and compared it with the welfare state. He outlined an economic interpretation of history that included concepts of the proletariat and of class struggle, but he shared the fear of violent revolution common among middle-class liberals and advocated reformist solutions instead. He gave emphasis to the "Social Question" that the industrial worker in a capitalist country has no chance to acquire property and capital by work, which was to be addressed by a program of welfare state and social administration arranged according to the liberal principle of free and equal individual chances.

Despite a similarity of his ideas with those of Marxism, the extent of Stein's influence on Karl Marx is uncertain. However, Marx shows by scattered remarks on von Stein that he was aware of his highly influential book from 1842 on communist thought in France. For instance in The German Ideology (1845–46), Stein is mentioned, but only as the writer of his 1842 book.

Stein died at his home in Hadersdorf-Weidlingau in the Penzing District of Vienna and was buried at the Matzleinsdorf Protestant Cemetery.

== Books ==
- Der Sozialismus und Kommunismus des heutigen Frankreich, Leipzig 1842, second edition, 1847.
- Die sozialistischen und kommunistischen Bewegungen seit der dritten französischen Revolution, Stuttgart, 1848.
- Geschichte der sozialen Bewegung in Frankreich von 1789 bis auf unsere Tage, Leipzig, 1850, 3 volumes.
- Geschichte des französischen Strafrechts, Basel, 1847.
- Französische Staats- und Rechtsgeschichte, Basel, 1846- 1848, 3 volumes.
- System der Staatswissenschaft, Volume 1: Statistik, Basel, 1852; Volume 2: Gesellschaftslehre, Basel, 1857.
- Die neue Gestaltung der Geld- und Kreditverhältnisse in Österreichklñjo , Vienna, 1855.
- Lehrbuch der Volkswirtschaft, Vienna, 1858; third edition as Lehrbuch der Nationalökonomie, third edition,1887.
- Lehrbuch der Finanzwissenschaft, Leipzig, 1860; fifth edition, 1885 - 1886, 4 volumes.
- Die Lehre vom Heerwesen, Stuttgart, 1872.
- Verwaltungslehre, Stuttgart, 1865- 1884, 8 volumes.
- Handbuch der Verwaltungslehre, Stuttgart, 1870; third edition, 1889, 3 volumes.
