= Meiji Constitution =

1890–1947 Empire of Japan constitution

Constitution of the Empire of Japan
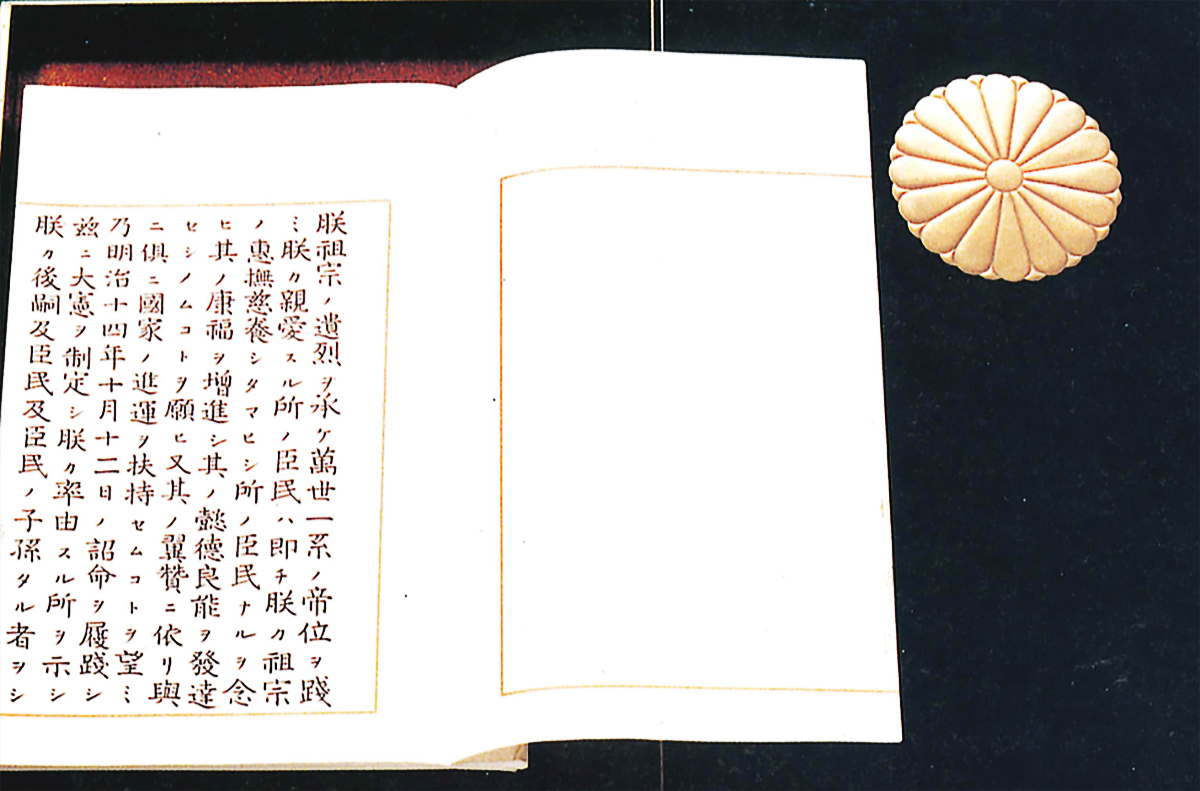
- Preamble of the Constitution

Overview
- Original title: 大日本帝国憲法 (Dai-Nippon Teikoku Kenpō)
- Jurisdiction: Empire of Japan; Taiwan (1895–1945); Korea (1910–1945)
- Created: February 11, 1889 (Meiji 22)
- Presented: April 1888
- Date effective: November 29, 1890
- System: Unitary parliamentary semi-constitutional monarchy

Government structure
- Branches: Three
- Head of state: The Emperor
- Chambers: Bicameral (Imperial Diet: House of Representatives, House of Peers)
- Executive: Cabinet, led by a Prime Minister
- Judiciary: Supreme Court
- Federalism: Unitary
- Electoral college: No

History
- First legislature: February 11, 1889 (HP); July 1, 1890 (HR)
- First executive: 1885
- Repealed: May 3, 1947
- Amendments: 0 (no amendments)
- Location: National Archives of Japan
- Authors: Inoue Kowashi, Kaneko Kentarō, Itō Miyoji and Iwakura Tomomi, along with a number of foreign advisors
- Signatories: Emperor Meiji on February 11, 1889
- Supersedes: Ritsuryō codes

Full text
- Constitution of the Empire of Japan at Wikisource
- 大日本帝国憲法 (Dai-Nippon Teikoku Kenpō) at Japanese Wikisource

The Constitution of the Empire of Japan (in English)

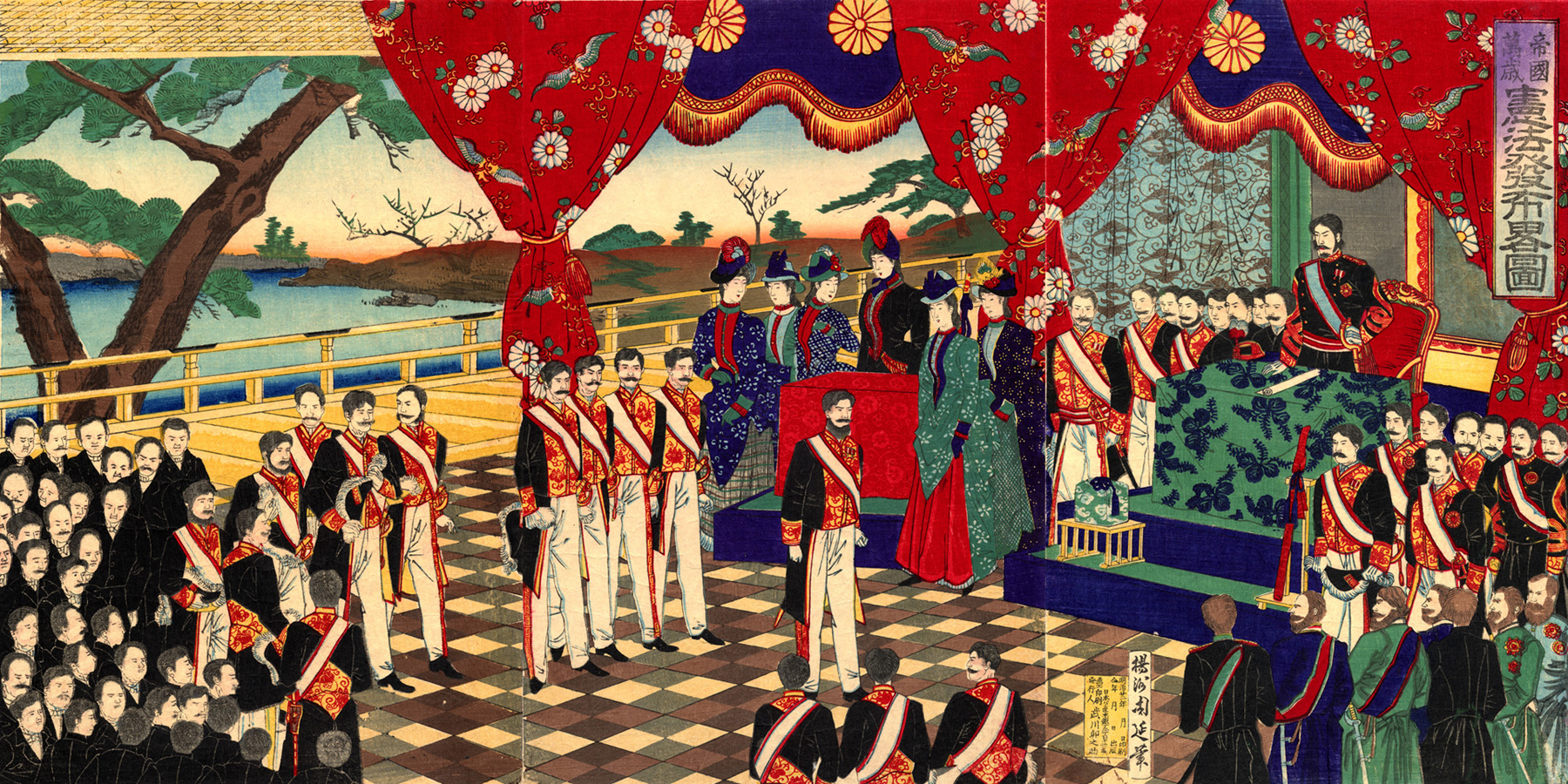
Meiji Constitution promulgation by Toyohara Chikanobu

The Constitution of the Empire of Japan (Kyūjitai: 大日本帝國憲法; Shinjitai: 大日本帝国憲法, romanized: Dai-Nippon Teikoku Kenpō), known informally as the Meiji Constitution (明治憲法, Meiji Kenpō), was the constitution of the Empire of Japan which was proclaimed on February 11, 1889, and remained in force between November 29, 1890, until May 2, 1947. Enacted after the Meiji Restoration in 1868, it provided for a form of mixed constitutional and absolute monarchy, primarily based on the German and partly based on the British models.

In theory, the Emperor of Japan should have governed the empire as a constitutional monarch with the advice of his ministers; in practice, the Emperor was the head of state and the commander-in-chief while the Prime Minister of Japan was only the head of government. Under the Meiji Constitution, the Prime Minister and his Cabinet were not necessarily chosen from the elected members of parliament, with the Imperial Japanese Armed Forces and the Meiji oligarchy having a veto over cabinet selection.

Following the surrender of Japan and during the Allied occupation of Japan, the Meiji Constitution was replaced with the "Postwar Constitution" on November 3, 1946; the latter document has been in force since May 3, 1947. In order to maintain legal continuity, the Postwar Constitution was enacted as an amendment to the Meiji Constitution.

== Overview ==
The Meiji Restoration in 1868 provided for Japan elements of a constitutional monarchy based on the Prusso-German model, in which the Emperor of Japan was an active ruler and wielded considerable political power over foreign policy and diplomacy which was shared with an elected Imperial Diet. The Diet primarily dictated domestic policy matters. While there were such elements, the Empire of Japan was from 1868 until 1889 an absolute monarchy.

After the Meiji Restoration, which restored direct political power to the emperor for the first time in over a millennium, Japan underwent a period of sweeping political and social reform and westernization aimed at strengthening Japan to the level of the nations of the Western world. The immediate consequence of the Constitution was the opening of the first Parliamentary government in Asia.

The Meiji Constitution established clear limits on the powers of the executive branch and the Emperor. It also created an independent judiciary. Civil rights and liberties were allowed, though they were freely subject to limitation by law. Free speech, freedom of association and freedom of religion were all limited by laws. The leaders of the government and the political parties were left with the task of interpretation as to whether the Meiji Constitution could be used to justify authoritarian or liberal-democratic rule. It was the struggle between these tendencies that dominated the government of the Empire of Japan. The franchise was limited, with only 1.1% of the population eligible to vote for the Diet. Universal manhood suffrage was not established (under law) until the General Election Law, which gave every male aged 25 and over a voting right, was enacted in 1925, while females were banned from voting.

The Meiji Constitution was later used as a model for the 1931 Constitution of Ethiopia by the Ethiopian intellectual Tekle Hawariat Tekle Mariyam. This was one of the reasons why the progressive Ethiopian intelligentsia associated with Tekle Hawariat were known as "Japanizers".

By the surrender in the World War II on September 2, 1945, the Empire of Japan was deprived of sovereignty by the Allies, and the Meiji Constitution was suspended. During the Occupation of Japan, the Meiji Constitution was replaced by a new document, the postwar Constitution of Japan. This document replaced imperial rule with a form of Western-style liberal democracy. To preserve legal continuity, these changes were enacted as a constitutional amendment per Article 73 of the Meiji Constitution. After garnering the required two-thirds majority in both chambers, it received imperial assent on November 3, 1946, and took effect on May 3, 1947.

== History ==
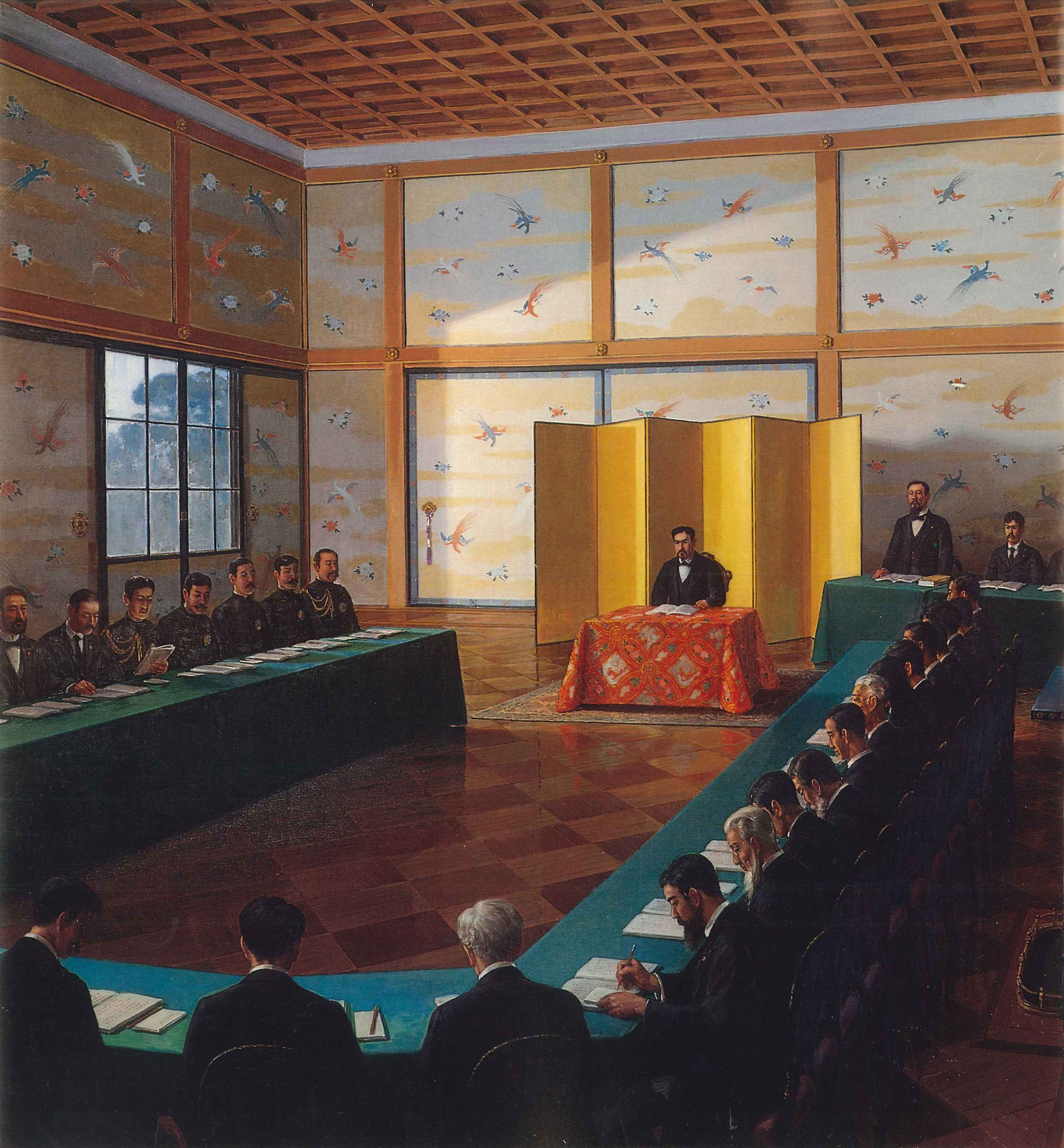
Conference on Drafting a Constitution by Goseda Hōryū, showing Itō Hirobumi explaining the draft to the Emperor and the Privy Council in June 1888 (Meiji Memorial Picture Gallery)

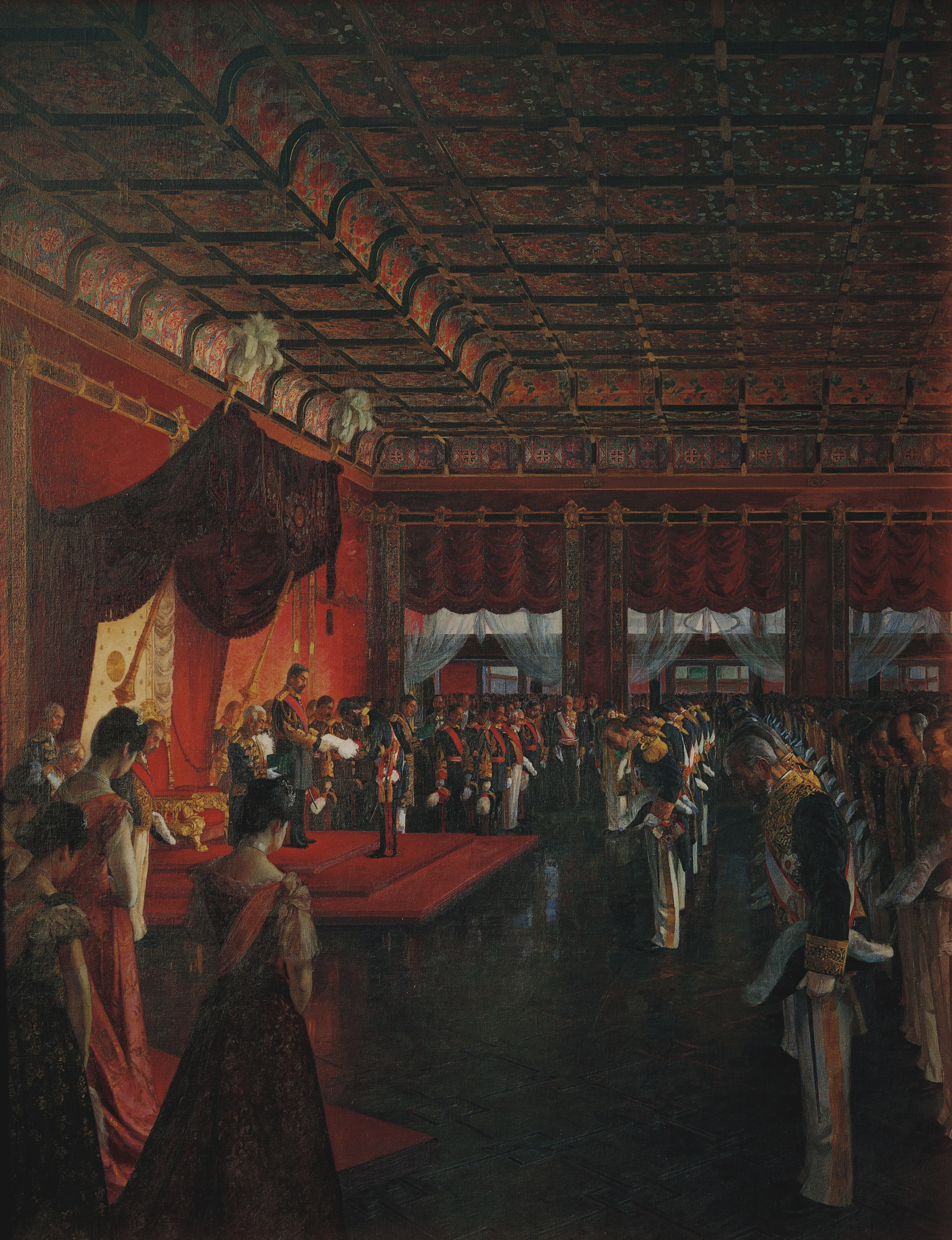
Ceremony for the Promulgation of the Constitution by Wada Eisaku, showing the Emperor presenting the Constitution to Prime Minister Kuroda Kiyotaka at a ceremony in the Imperial Palace on 11 February 1889 (Meiji Memorial Picture Gallery)

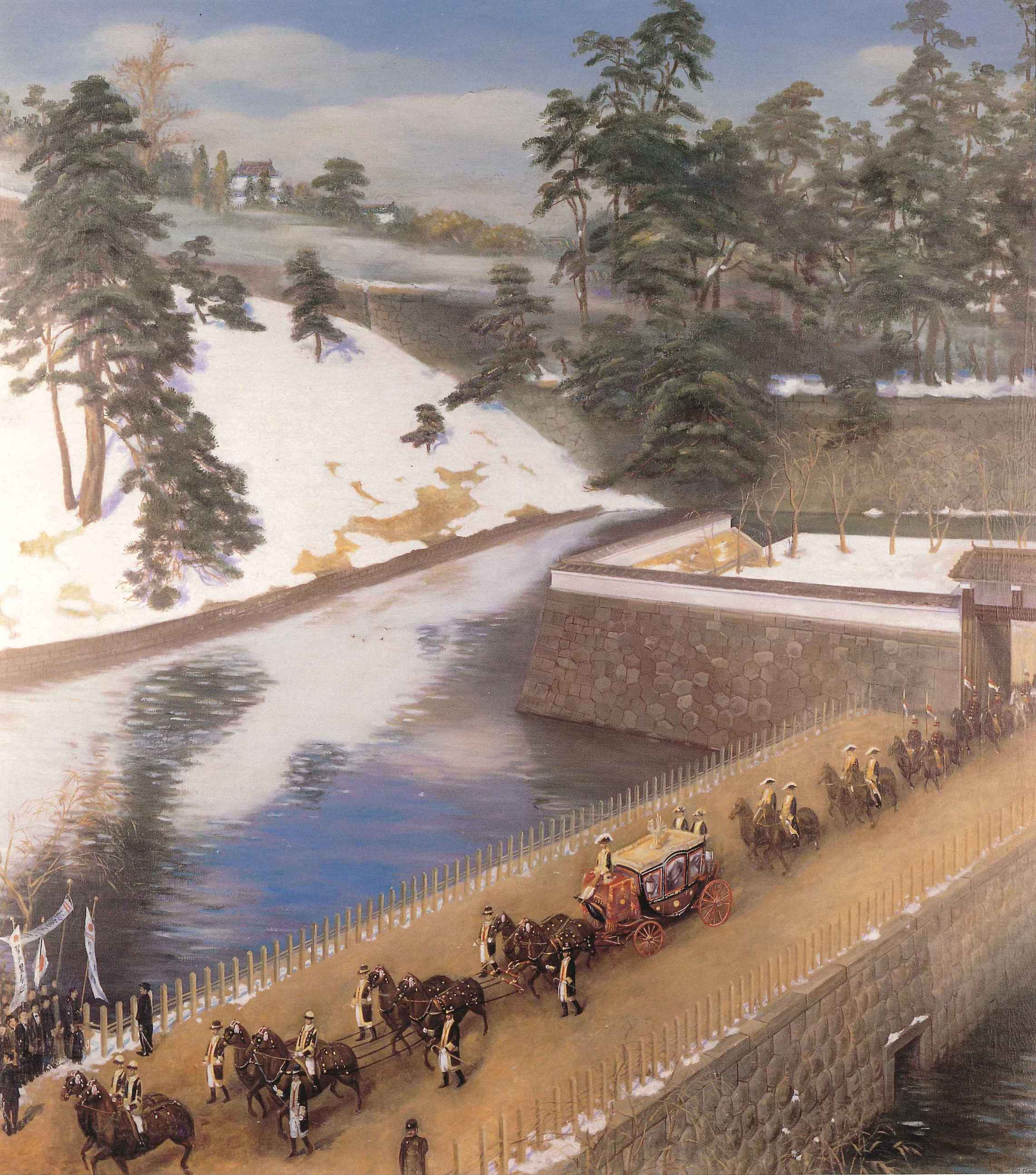
Grand Parade to Celebrate the Constitution, also on the day of promulgation, by Katata Tokurō (Meiji Memorial Picture Gallery)

=== Background ===
Prior to the adoption of the Meiji Constitution, Japan had in practice no written constitution. Originally, a Chinese-inspired legal system and constitution known as ritsuryō was enacted in the 6th century (in the late Asuka period and early Nara period); it described a government based on an elaborate and theoretically rational meritocratic bureaucracy, serving under the ultimate authority of the Emperor and organized based on Chinese imperial models. In theory, the last ritsuryō code, the Yōrō Code enacted in 752, was still in force at the time of the Meiji Restoration.

However, in practice, the ritsuryō system of government had become largely an empty formality as early as in the middle of the Heian period in the 10th and 11th centuries, a development which was completed by the establishment of the Kamakura Shogunate in 1185. The high positions in the ritsuryō system remained as sinecures, and the Emperor was de-powered and set aside as a symbolic figure who "reigned, but did not rule" (on the theory that the living god should not have to defile himself with matters of earthly government).

Before Meiji, Japan was ruled by the Tokugawa shogunate, whereby real power was held by the shogun. When the Meiji Restoration overthrew the system, the new leaders wanted to prevent any one dominating "shogun-like" warlord figure from controlling the military and overshadowing the state. The Emperor was seen as a unifying figure capable of commanding loyalty across regions and classes, thus authority was centralized around the monarch.

The Charter Oath was promulgated on 6 April 1868, which outlined the fundamental policies of the government and demanded the establishment of deliberative assemblies, but it did not determine the details. The idea of a written constitution had been a subject of heated debate within and outside the government since the beginnings of the Meiji government. The conservative Meiji oligarchy viewed anything resembling democracy or republicanism with suspicion and trepidation, and favored a gradualist approach. The Freedom and People's Rights Movement demanded the immediate establishment of an elected national assembly, and the promulgation of a constitution.

=== Drafting ===
On October 21, 1881, Itō Hirobumi was appointed to chair a government bureau to research various forms of constitutional government, and in 1882, Itō led an overseas mission to observe and study various systems first-hand. The United States Constitution was rejected as too liberal. The French and Spanish models were rejected as tending toward despotism. The Reichstag and legal structures of the German Empire, particularly that of Prussia, proved to be of the most interest to the Constitutional Study Mission. Influence was also drawn from the British Westminster system, although it was considered as being unwieldy and granting too much power to Parliament.

He also rejected some notions as unfit for Japan, as they stemmed from European constitutional practice and Christianity. He therefore added references to the kokutai or "national polity" as the justification of the emperor's authority through his divine descent and the unbroken line of emperors, and the unique relationship between subject and sovereign based on State Shinto.

The Council of State was replaced in 1885 with a cabinet headed by Itō Hirobumi as Prime Minister. The positions of Chancellor, Minister of the Left, and Minister of the Right, which had existed since the seventh century, were abolished. In their place, the Privy Council was established in 1888 to evaluate the forthcoming constitution, and to advise Emperor Meiji.

The draft committee included Inoue Kowashi, Kaneko Kentarō, Itō Miyoji and Iwakura Tomomi, along with a number of foreign advisors from the Western world, in particular the German legal scholars Rudolf von Gneist and Lorenz von Stein. The central issue was the balance between sovereignty vested in the person of the Emperor, and an elected representative legislature with powers that would limit or restrict the power of the sovereign. After numerous drafts from 1886 to 1888, the final version was submitted to Emperor Meiji in April 1888. The Meiji Constitution was drafted in secret by the committee, without public debate.

=== Promulgation ===
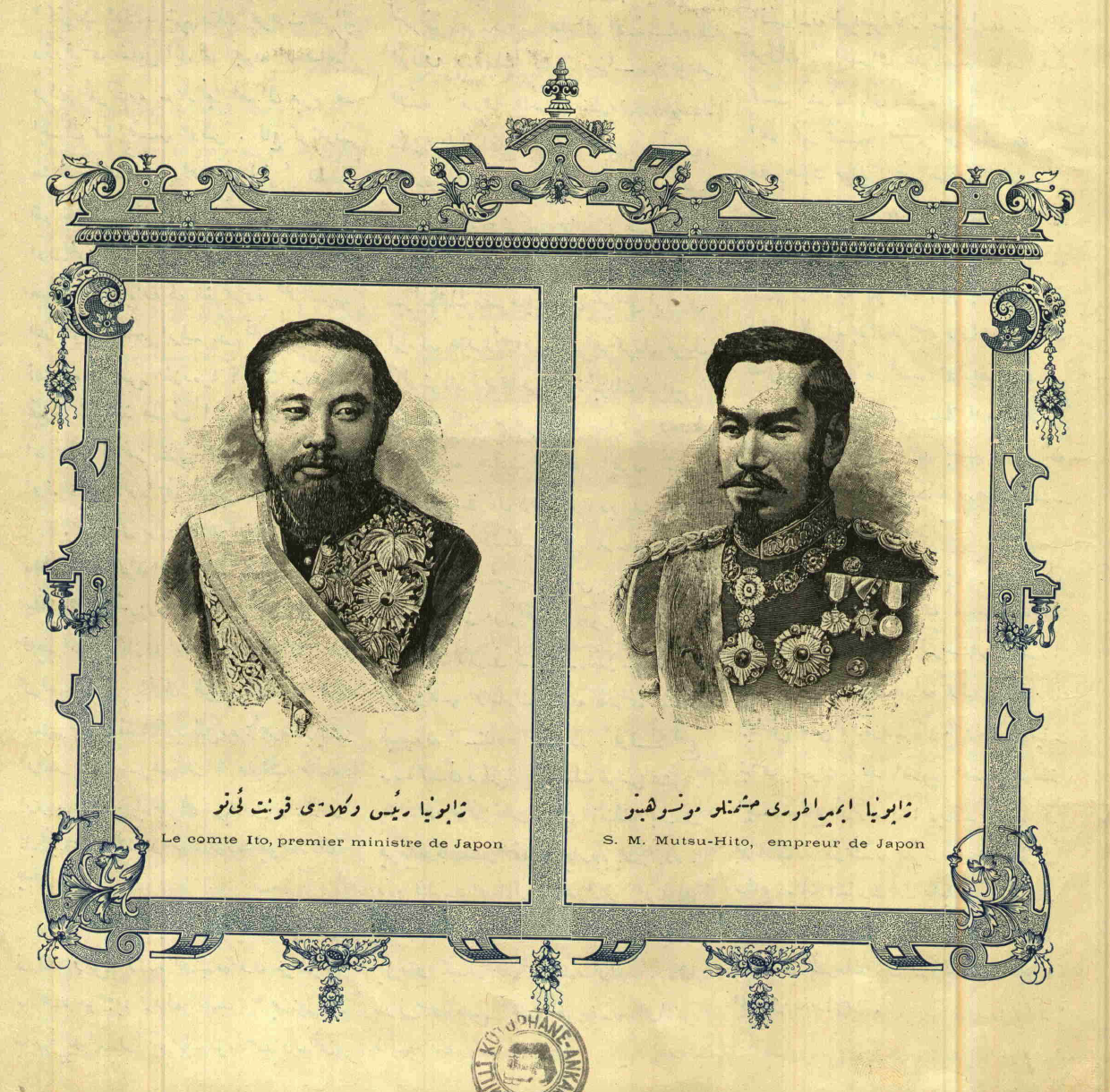
Itō Hirobumi and Emperor Meiji (Servet-i Fünun 25 October 1894 front page)

The new constitution was promulgated by Emperor Meiji on February 11, 1889 (the anniversary of the National Foundation Day of Japan in 660 BC), but came into effect on November 29, 1890.

The first National Diet of Japan, a new representative assembly, convened on the day the Meiji Constitution came into force. The organizational structure of the Diet reflected both Prussian and British influences, most notably in the inclusion of the House of Representatives as the lower house (existing currently, under the Article 42 of the post-war Japanese Constitution based on bicameralism) and the House of Peers as the upper house, (which resembled the Prussian Herrenhaus and the British House of Lords, now the House of Councillors of Japan under the Article 42 of the post-war Japanese Constitution based on bicameralism), and in the formal Speech from the Throne delivered by the Emperor on Opening Day (existing currently, under the Article 7 of the post-war Japanese Constitution). The second chapter of the constitution, detailing the rights of citizens, bore a resemblance to similar articles in both European and North American constitutions of the day.

== Main provisions ==
Schematic overview of the government structure under the Constitution

=== Structure ===
The Meiji Constitution consists of 76 articles in seven chapters, together amounting to around 2,500 words. It is also usually reproduced with its Preamble, the Imperial Oath Sworn in the Sanctuary in the Imperial Palace, and the Imperial Rescript on the Promulgation of the Constitution, which together come to nearly another 1,000 words. The seven chapters are:

- I. The Emperor (1–17)
- II. Rights and Duties of Subjects (18–32)
- III. The Imperial Diet (33–54)
- IV. The Ministers of State and the Privy Council (55–56)
- V. The Judicature (57–61)
- VI. Finance (62–72)
- VII. Supplementary Rules (73–76)

=== Imperial sovereignty ===
Unlike its modern successor, the Meiji Constitution was founded on the principle that sovereignty resided in person of the Emperor, by virtue of his divine ancestry referenced in Article 1, stating "The Empire of Japan shall be reigned over and governed by a line of Emperors unbroken for ages eternal.", rather than in the people. This is reinforced by Article 3 and 4 which state that, "The Emperor is sacred and inviolable" and, "The Emperor is the head of the Empire, combining in himself the rights of sovereignty", respectively. The Emperor, nominally at least, united within himself all three branches (executive, legislative and judiciary) of government, although legislation (article 5) and the budget (article 64) were subject to the "consent of the Imperial Diet". Laws were issued and justice administered by the courts "in the name of the Emperor".

Rules on the succession of the imperial throne and on the Imperial household were left outside the Constitution; instead, a separate Act on the Imperial household (kōshitsu tenpan) was adopted. This Act was not publicly promulgated, because it was seen as a private Act of the Imperial household rather than a public law.

Separate provisions of the Constitution are contradictory as to whether the Constitution or the Emperor is supreme.

- Article 3 declares him to be "sacred and inviolable", a formula which was construed by hard-line monarchists to mean that he retained the right to withdraw the constitution, or to ignore its provisions.
- Article 4 binds the Emperor to exercise his powers "according to the provisions of the present Constitution".
- Article 11 declares that the Emperor commands the Imperial Japanese Army and the Imperial Japanese Navy. The heads of these services was interpreted to mean that "The army and navy obey and serve only the Emperor, and do not have to obey and serve the cabinet and diet", which caused political controversies over civilian control over the military.
- Article 55, however, confirmed that the Emperor's commands (including Imperial Ordinance, Edicts, Rescripts, etc.) had no legal force within themselves, but required the signature of a "Minister of State". On the other hand, these "Ministers of State" were appointed by (and could be dismissed by), the Emperor alone, and not by the Prime Minister, the Cabinet or the Diet.

=== Rights and duties of subjects ===
- Duties: The constitution asserts the duty of Japanese subjects to uphold the constitution (preamble), pay taxes (Article 21) and serve in the armed forces if conscripted (Article 20).
- Qualified rights: The constitution provides for a number of rights that subjects may enjoy where the law does not provide otherwise. These included the right to:
  - Freedom of movement (Article 22).
  - Not have one's house searched or entered (Article 25).
  - Privacy of correspondence (Article 26).
  - Private property (Article 27).
  - Freedom of speech, assembly and association (Article 29).
- Less conditional rights
  - Right to "be appointed to civil or military or any other public offices equally" (Article 19).
  - 'Procedural' due process (Article 23).
  - Right to trial before a judge (Article 24).
  - Freedom of religion (Guaranteed by Article 28 "within limits not prejudicial to peace and order, and not antagonistic to their duties as subjects").
  - Right to petition government (Article 30).

=== Organs of government ===
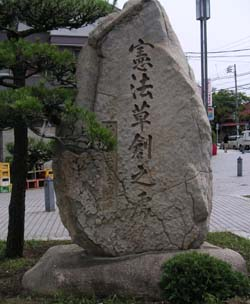
Memorial in Yokohama reading “Place of the Drafting of the Constitution” (憲法草創之處, kempō sōsō no tokoro) in kyūjitai

The Emperor of Japan had the right to exercise executive authority, and to appoint and dismiss all government officials. The Emperor also had the sole rights to declare war, make peace, conclude treaties, dissolve the lower house of Diet, and issue Imperial ordinances in place of laws when the Diet was not in session. Most importantly, command over the Imperial Japanese Army and Imperial Japanese Navy was directly held by the Emperor and not the Prime Minister, the Cabinet or the Diet. The Meiji Constitution provided for a imperial cabinet consisting of Ministers of State who answered to the Emperor rather than the Diet, and to the establishment of the Privy Council. Not mentioned in the Constitution were the genrō, an inner circle of advisors/elders to the Emperor, who wielded considerable influence.

While the Constitution did not explicitly state that the military had the right to appoint the cabinet, it created a structural loophole that gave the military de facto power to control the formation and survival of the cabinet. The most potent tool was the rule that the Army Minister and the Navy Minister had to be active-duty officers (a general or lieutenant-general for the Army, and an admiral or vice-admiral for the Navy). Because the military branches appointed their own ministers, they could refuse to nominate one, or order their serving minister to resign. Without these ministers, the Prime Minister could not have formed or maintained an existing Cabinet, effectively giving the military veto power over the civilian government. Article 11 further established that the Emperor had supreme command of the Army and Navy, allowing the military to report directly to the Emperor that bypassed the civilian chain of command entirely.

Under the Meiji Constitution, a legislature, the Diet, was established with two houses. The Upper House, or House of Peers consisted of members of the Imperial Family, hereditary peerage and members appointed by the Emperor. The Lower House, or House of Representatives was directly elected by all males who paid at least 15 yen in property taxes, effectively limiting the suffrage to 1.1 percent of the population. These qualifications were loosened in 1900 and 1919 with universal adult male suffrage introduced in 1925. The Emperor shared legislative authority with the Diet, and no measure could become law without the agreement of the Emperor and the Diet. On the other hand, the Diet was given the authority to initiate legislation, approve all laws, and approve the budget.

While the Imperial Diet included representatives from colonies in its later years, the Constitution was primarily intended for Japanese people proper (naichi), and colonial subjects were often governed by special regulations rather than the full set of rights afforded to Japanese citizens.

== Amendments ==
Amendments to the constitution were provided for by Article 73. This stipulated that, to become law, a proposed amendment had to be submitted first to the Diet by the Emperor through an imperial order or rescript. To be approved by the Diet, an amendment had to be adopted in both chambers by a two-thirds majority of the members present, with the quorum held at two-thirds of the total number of members of each as opposed to the one-third required for ordinary legislation. Once it had been approved by the Diet, an amendment was then promulgated into law by the Emperor, who had an absolute right of veto. No amendment to the constitution was permitted during the time of a regency. Despite these provisions, no amendments were made to the imperial constitution from the time it was adopted until its demise in 1947. The present constitution is legally reckoned as an amendment to the Meiji Constitution; this was done to preserve legal continuity even though it is a completely new document.

However, according to Article 73 of the Meiji Constitution, the amendment should be authorized by the Emperor. Indeed, the 1947 Constitution was authorized by the Emperor (as was declared in the letter of promulgation), which is in apparent conflict of the 1947 Constitution, according to which that constitution was made and authorized by the nation ("the principle of popular sovereignty"). To dissipate such inconsistencies, some peculiar doctrine of "August Revolution" was proposed by Toshiyoshi Miyazawa of the University of Tokyo, but without much persuasiveness.
