= Maruki Riyō =

Japanese photographer

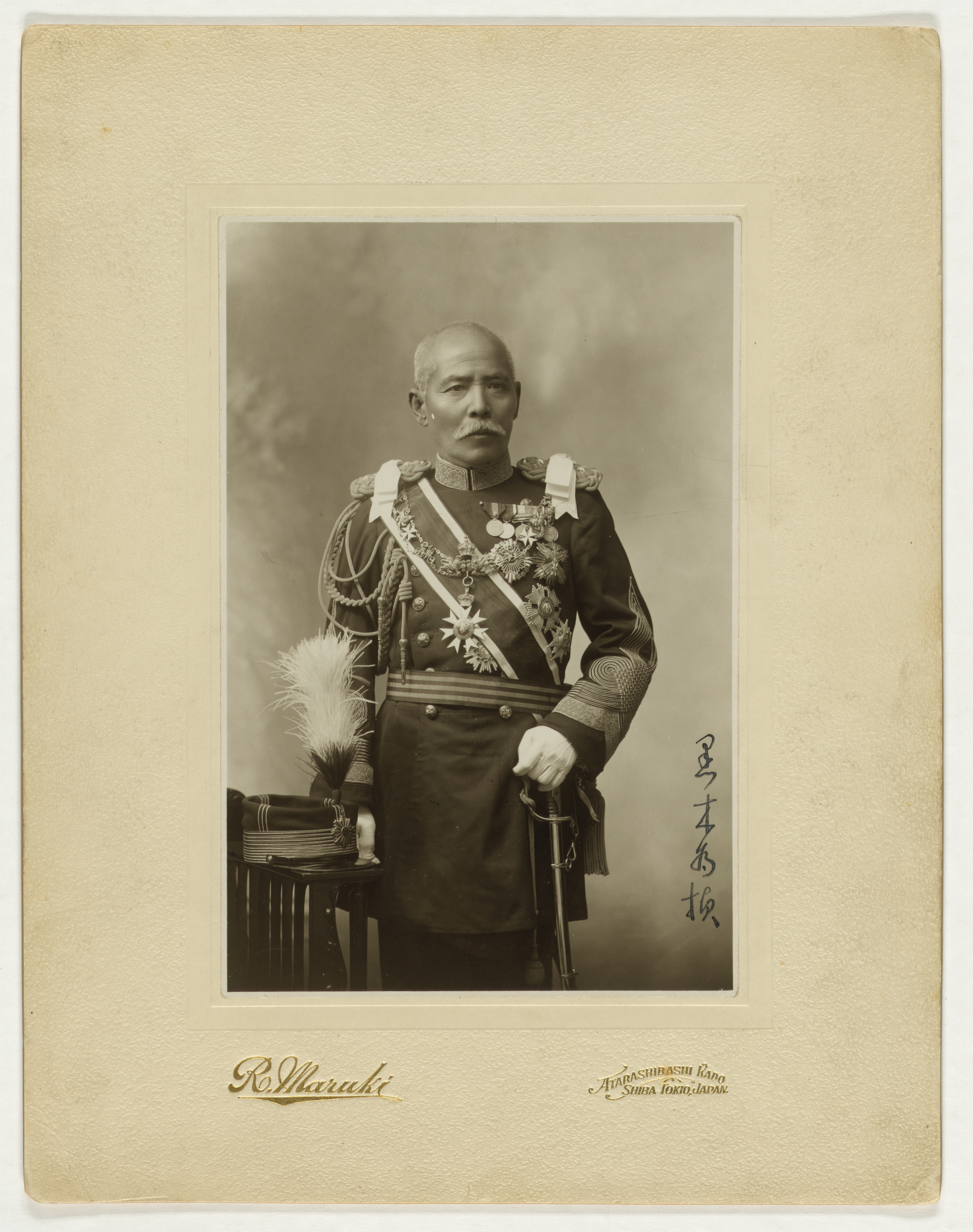
Maruki Riyō was the photographer who created this ca. 1907 image of General Kuroki Tamemoto, who was the commander of the Imperial Japanese First Army during the Russo-Japanese War. Note Maruki Riyō's name embossed in gold at bottom left of the original cardboard frame and see Atarashibashi Kado, Shiba, Tokio, Japan at bottom right.

Maruki Riyō (丸木 利陽; 1854–1923) was a prominent Japanese photographer during the late-Meiji period.

Maruki opened his first studio in the Uchisaiwaicho district of Tokyo in 1880, and his business continued up until the early 1920s.

In 1888 he was asked to help in producing a new official photograph of the Emperor as the one then in use was ten years old.
