= Demographics of the Empire of Japan =

Japan's demographics (1868–1945)

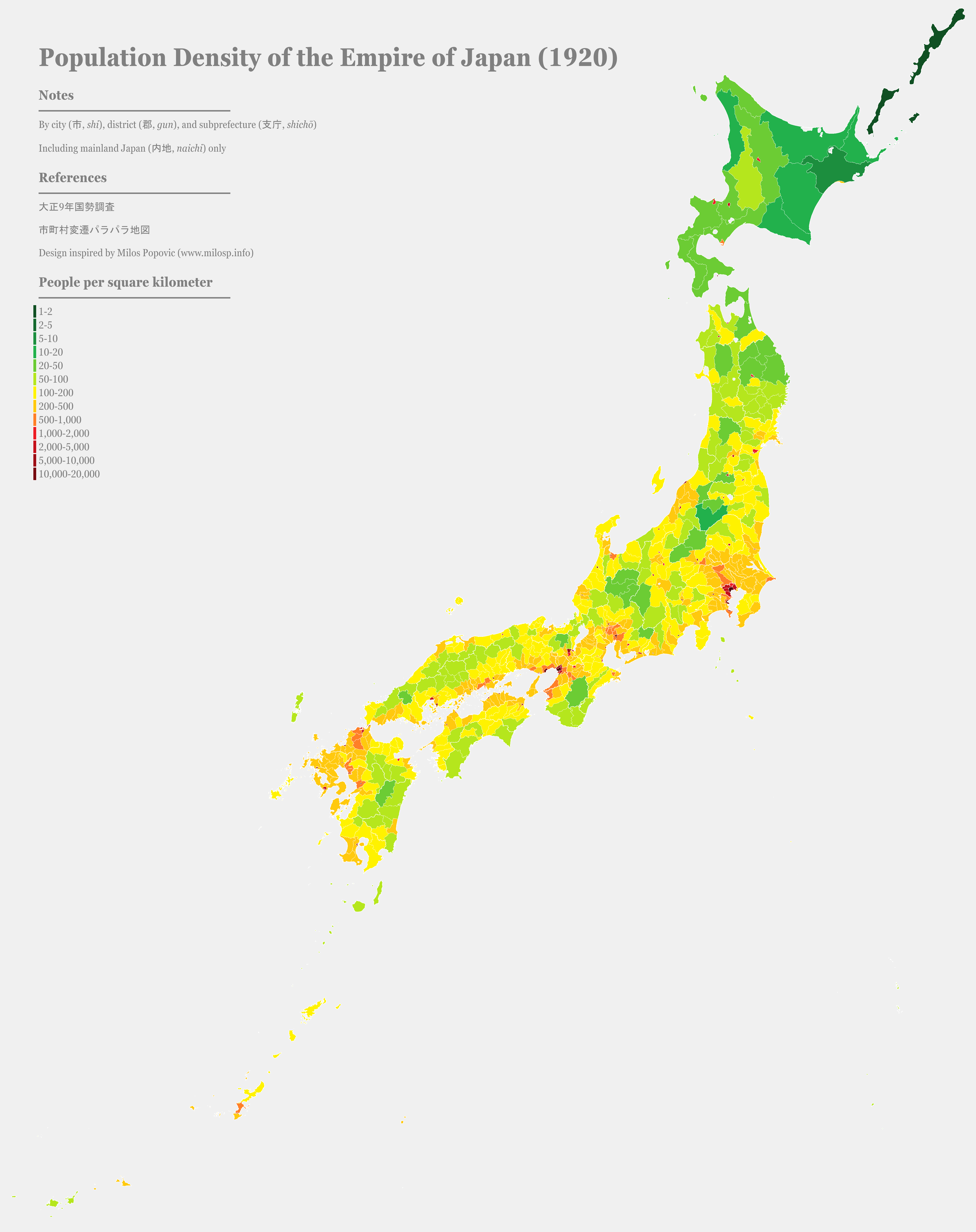
Population density map of the naichi of the Empire of Japan (1920)

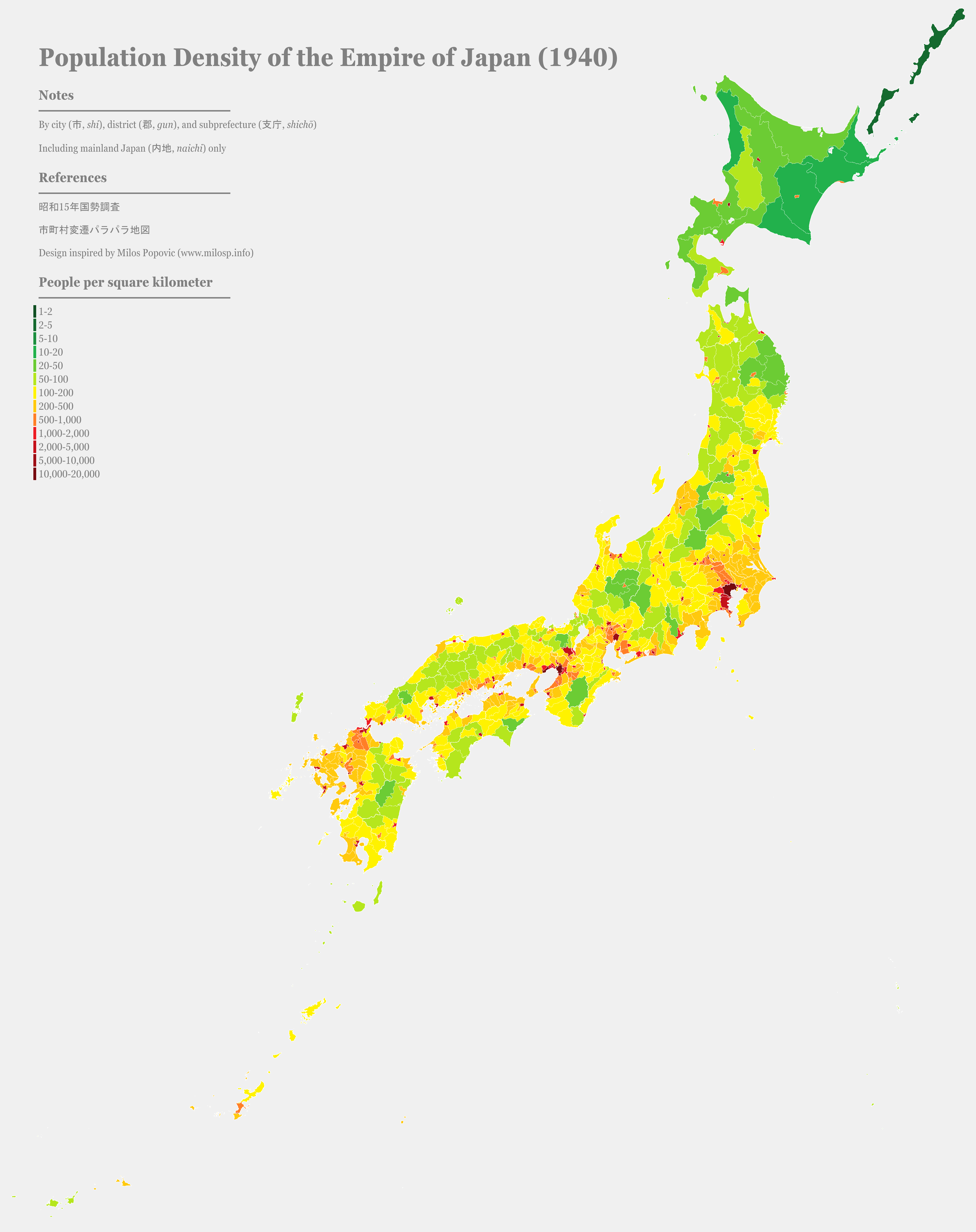
Population density map of the naichi of the Empire of Japan (1940)

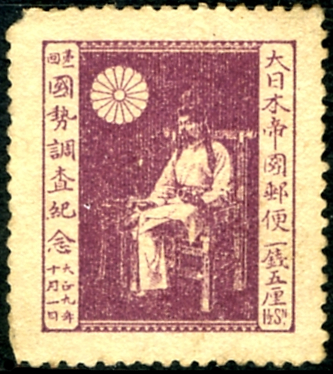
1920 Commemorative stamp for 1st national census of the Empire of Japan

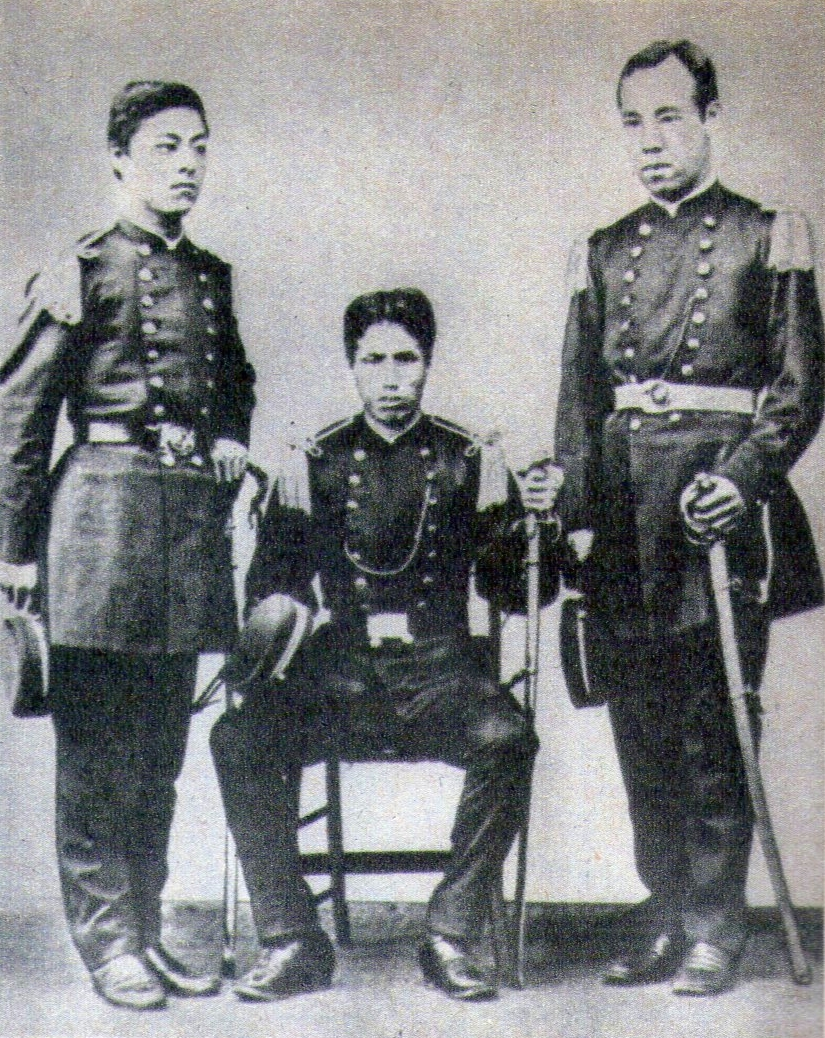
Japanese policemen circa 1875

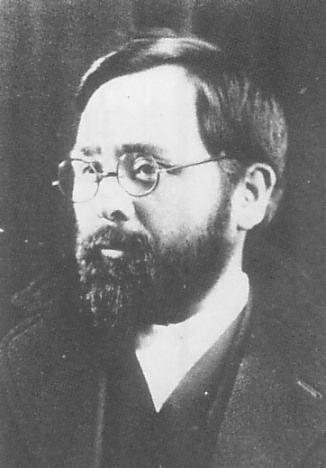
Jiichiro Matsumoto, a Japanese politician, leader of the Burakumin liberation movement

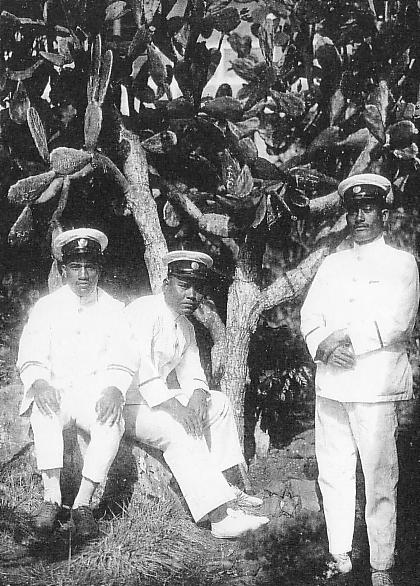
Native Micronesian constables of Truk Island, circa 1930

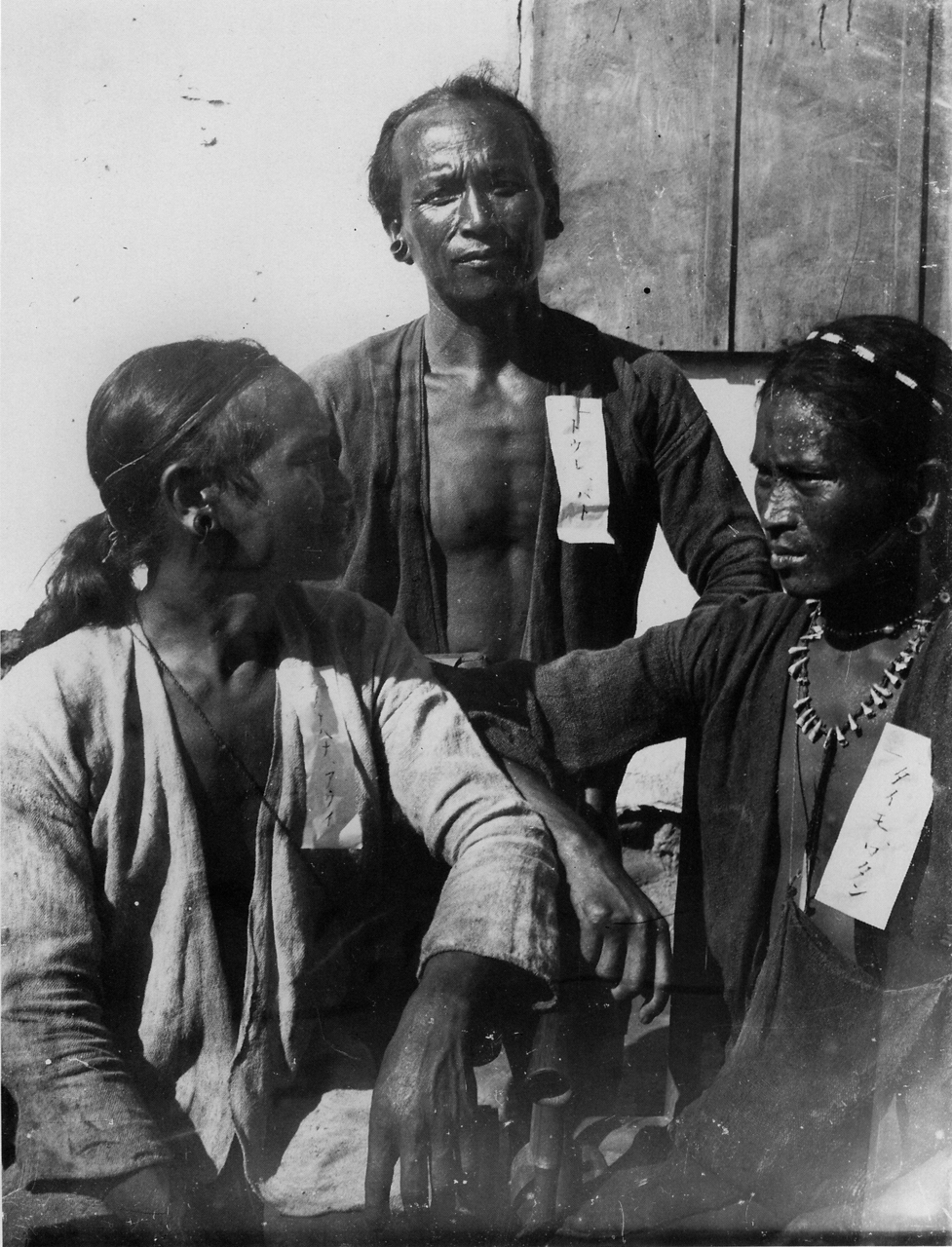
Photograph of Atayal men in 1900

The population of Japan at the time of the Meiji Restoration was estimated to be 34,985,000 on January 1, 1873, while the official original family registries (本籍, honseki) and de facto (or present registries (現住, genjū)) populations on the same day were 33,300,644 and 33,416,939, respectively. These were comparable to the population of the United Kingdom (31,000,000), France (38,000,000), and Austria-Hungary (38,000,000).

== Japan proper ==
=== Total population ===
Meiji government established the uniformed registered system of koseki (戸籍, family registries) in 1872, which is called Jinshin koseki (壬申戸籍).

Year	honseki population	A-type de facto population	B-type de facto population	Estimated population
Mar 8, 1872	33,110,796	33,238,011		34,806,000
Jan 1, 1873	33,300,644	33,416,939		34,985,000
Jan 1, 1874	33,625,646	33,749,932		35,154,000
Jan 1, 1875	33,997,415	33,997,250		35,316,000
Jan 1, 1876	34,338,367	34,302,068		35,555,000
Jan 1, 1877	34,628,328			35,870,000
Jan 1, 1878	34,898,540			36,166,000
Jan 1, 1879	35,768,547			36,464,000
Jan 1, 1880	35,929,023			36,649,000
Jan 1, 1881	36,358,955			36,965,000
Jan 1, 1882	36,700,079			37,259,000
Jan 1, 1883	37,017,262			37,569,000
Jan 1, 1884	37,451,727	37,687,645	37,451,800	37,962,000
Jan 1, 1885	37,868,949	37,975,069	37,704,100	38,313,000
Jan 1, 1886	38,151,217	38,276,376	38,147,600	38,541,000
Dec 31, 1886	38,507,177	38,833,415	38,530,400	38,703,000 (as of Jan 1, 1887)
Dec 31, 1887	39,069,691	39,510,146	39,137,100	39,029,000 (as of Jan 1, 1888)
Dec 31, 1888	39,607,234	40,105,479	39,626,600	39,473,000 (as of Jan 1, 1889)
Dec 31, 1889	40,072,020	40,692,808	40,076,500	39,902,000 (as of Jan 1, 1890)
Dec 31, 1890	40,453,461	40,968,835	40,460,300	40,251,000 (as of Jan 1, 1891)
Dec 31, 1891	40,718,677	41,268,732	40,718,800	40,508,000 (as of Jan 1, 1892)
Dec 31, 1892	41,089,940	41,696,847	41,083,400	40,860,000 (as of Jan 1, 1893)
Dec 31, 1893	41,388,313	42,060,976	41,378,600	41,142,000 (as of Jan 1, 1894)
Dec 31, 1894	41,813,215	42,430,985	41,694,700	41,557,000 (as of Jan 1, 1895)
Dec 31, 1895	42,270,620	43,048,226	42,225,300	41,992,000 (as of Jan 1, 1896)
Dec 31, 1896	42,708,264	43,499,833	42,665,300	42,400,000 (as of Jan 1, 1897)
Dec 31, 1897	43,228,863	43,978,495	43,180,400	42,886,000 (as of Jan 1, 1898)
Dec 31, 1898	43,763,855	45,403,041	43,716,400	43,404,000 (as of Jan 1, 1899)
Dec 31, 1899	44,270,495		44,269,900	43,847,000 (as of Jan 1, 1900)
Dec 31, 1900	44,825,597		44,831,300	44,359,000 (as of Jan 1, 1901)
Dec 31, 1901	45,446,369		45,404,700	44,964,000 (as of Jan 1, 1902)
Dec 31, 1902	46,041,768		45,990,000	45,546,000 (as of Jan 1, 1903)
Dec 31, 1903	46,732,876	48,542,736	46,588,000	46,135,000 (as of Jan 1, 1904)
Dec 31, 1904	47,219,566		47,197,600	46,620,000 (as of Jan 1, 1905)
Dec 31, 1905	47,678,396		47,819,300	47,038,000 (as of Jan 1, 1906)
Dec 31, 1906	48,164,761		48,451,100	47,416,000 (as of Jan 1, 1907)
Dec 31, 1907	48,819,630		49,092,000	47,965,000 (as of Jan 1, 1908)
Dec 31, 1908	49,588,804	51,742,486	49,318,300	48,554,000 (as of Jan 1, 1909)
Dec 31, 1909	50,254,471		50,011,700	49,184,000 (as of Jan 1, 1910)
Dec 31, 1910	50,984,844		50,716,600	49,852,000 (as of Jan 1, 1911)
Dec 31, 1911	51,753,934		51,435,400	50,577,000 (as of Jan 1, 1912)
Dec 31, 1912	52,522,753		52,167,000	51,305,000 (as of Jan 1, 1913)
Dec 31, 1913	53,362,682	55,131,270	52,911,800	52,039,000 (as of Jan 1, 1914)
Dec 31, 1914	54,142,441		53,668,600	52,752,000 (as of Jan 1, 1915)
Dec 31, 1915	54,935,755		54,439,400	53,496,000 (as of Jan 1, 1916)
Dec 31, 1916	55,637,431		55,224,500	54,134,000 (as of Jan 1, 1917)
Dec 31, 1917	56,335,971		56,022,700	54,739,000 (as of Jan 1, 1918)
Dec 31, 1918	56,667,711	58,087,277	55,662,900	55,033,000 (as of Jan 1, 1919)
Dec 31, 1919	57,233,906		56,253,200	55,473,000 (as of Jan 1, 1920)

The first national census based on a full sampling of inhabitants was conducted in Japan in 1920 and was conducted every five years thereafter. Per the Statistics Bureau of the Ministry of Internal Affairs and Communications, the population distribution of Japan proper from 1920 to 1945 is as follows

Date	Population	% Change	Area (km2)	Density (km2)	% Urban
1920-10-01	55,963,053	NA	381,808.04	147	18.0
1925-10-01	59,736,822	6.7	381,810.06	156	21.6
1930-10-01	64,450,005	7.9	382,264.91	169	24.0
1935-10-01	69,254,148	7.5	382,545.42	181	32.7
1940-10-01	73,114,308	5.6	382,545.42	191	37.7
1945-11-01	71,998,104	-0.7	377,298.15	195	22.8

The above figures include Hokkaidō, the northernmost island; the central island of Honshū, site of the most important cities and industrial centers; and the smaller islands of Kyūshū, Shikoku, and Okinawa (except for the 1945 census values).

== Total fertility rate from 1874 to 1950 ==
The total fertility rate is the number of children born per woman. It is based on fairly good data for the entire period. Sources: Our World In Data and Gapminder Foundation.

Years	1874	1875	1876	1877	1878	1879	1880
Total Fertility Rate in Japan	3.52	3.74	3.75	3.67	3.58	3.55	3.59

Years	1881	1882	1883	1884	1885	1886	1887	1888	1889	1890
Total Fertility Rate in Japan	3.77	3.67	3.96	3.8	3.98	4.04	4.04	4.43	4.54	4.18

Years	1891	1892	1893	1894	1895	1896	1897	1898	1899	1900
Total Fertility Rate in Japan	3.99	4.4	4.26	4.35	4.36	4.51	4.66	4.72	4.73	4.69

Years	1901	1902	1903	1904	1905	1906	1907	1908	1909	1910
Total Fertility Rate in Japan	5.01	4.97	4.83	4.61	4.52	4.38	5.03	5.13	5.16	5.01

Years	1911	1912	1913	1914	1915	1916	1917	1918	1919	1920
Total Fertility Rate in Japan	5.19	5.08	5.07	5.14	4.91	4.98	4.95	4.83	4.77	5.35

Years	1921	1922	1923	1924	1925	1926	1927	1928	1929	1930
Total Fertility Rate in Japan	5.22	5.12	5.26	5.07	5.22	5.19	5	5.09	4.87	4.82

Years	1931	1932	1933	1934	1935	1936	1937	1938	1939	1940
Total Fertility Rate in Japan	4.76	4.86	4.63	4.39	4.59	4.34	4.45	3.88	3.8	4.14

Years	1941	1942	1943	1944	1945	1946	1947	1948	1949	1950
Total Fertility Rate in Japan	4.36	4.18	4.11	3.95	3.11	3.37	4.51	4.38	4.3	3.44

Date	Population	% Change	Area (km2)	Density (km2)	% Urban
1920-10-01	55,963,053	NA	381,808.04	147	18.0
1925-10-01	59,736,822	6.7	381,810.06	156	21.6
1930-10-01	64,450,005	7.9	382,264.91	169	24.0
1935-10-01	69,254,148	7.5	382,545.42	181	32.7
1940-10-01	73,114,308	5.6	382,545.42	191	37.7
1945-11-01	71,998,104	-0.7	377,298.15	195	22.8

The above figures include Hokkaidō, the northernmost island; the central island of Honshū, site of the most important cities and industrial centers; and the smaller islands of Kyūshū, Shikoku, and Okinawa (except for the 1945 census values).

=== Urban population ===
In Japan proper, the population of major cities was as follows:

City or town	Japanese	Jan 1, 1873	Dec 31, 1886	Dec 31, 1889	Dec 31, 1893	Dec 31, 1898	Dec 31, 1903	Dec 31, 1908	Dec 31, 1913	Oct 1, 1920	Oct 1, 1925	Oct 1, 1930	Oct 1, 1935	Oct 1, 1940	Feb 22, 1944	Nov 1, 1945
Tokyo	東京	595,905	1,121,883	1,389,684	1,214,113	1,440,121	1,818,655	2,186,079	2,050,126	2,173,201	1,995,567	2,070,529	5,875,667	6,778,804	6,558,161	2,777,010
Osaka	大阪	271,992	361,694	476,271	482,961	821,235	995,945	1,226,647	1,395,823	1,252,983	2,114,804	2,452,569	2,989,874	3,252,340	2,833,344	1,102,959
Nagoya	名古屋	125,193	131,492	162,767	194,796	244,145	288,639	378,231	452,043	429,997	768,558	907,402	1,082,816	1,328,084	1,344,100	597,941
Yokohama	横浜	64,602	89,545	121,985	152,451	193,762	326,035	394,303	397,574	422,938	405,888	620,296	704,290	968,091	1,019,466	624,994
Kyoto	京都	238,663	245,675	279,792	317,270	353,139	380,568	442,462	509,380	591,323	679,963	765,142	1,010,593	1,089,726	964,466	866,153
Kobe	神戸	40,900	80,446	135,639	153,382	215,780	285,002	378,197	442,167	608,644	644,212	787,596	912,179	967,234	918,032	379,166
Kawasaki	川崎	3,123	4,031	5,036	4,896	5,647	5,564	7,239	10,060	21,391	54,634	104,346	154,748	300,777	380,919	180,042
Hiroshima	広島	74,305	81,914	88,820	91,479	122,306	121,196	142,763	167,130	160,510	195,731	270,365	310,118	343,968	336,483	137,197
Fukuoka	福岡	41,635	42,617	53,014	58,181	66,190	71,047	82,106	97,303	95,381	146,005	228,290	291,158	306,763	324,499	252,282
Yokosuka	横須賀	2,810	13,251	24,366	24,366	24,750	36,956	70,964	85,478	89,879	96,351	110,304	182,871	193,358	298,132	202,038
Miyahara/ Washō/ Kure	宮原/ 和庄/ 呉	n. d.	11,160	7,335	11,648	21,553	66,006	100,679	128,342	130,362	138,863	190,265	231,333	238,195	293,632	152,184
Nagasaki	長崎	29,656	38,229	55,063	65,374	107,422	153,293	176,480	161,174	176,534	189,071	204,179	211,702	252,630	270,113	142,748
Amagasaki	尼崎	12,404	12,742	13,580	13,955	15,066	18,006	19,888	25,045	38,461	44,241	50,064	71,072	181,011	270,073	153,051
Sendai	仙台	51,998	61,709	90,231	73,771	83,325	100,231	97,944	104,141	118,984	142,894	190,177	219,547	223,630	261,117	238,250
Yahata	八幡	n. d.	n. d.	3,068	2,309	3,014	7,592	22,767	45,630	100,235	118,376	168,218	208,629	261,309	252,662	151,378
Sasebo	佐世保	n. d.	n. d.	8,005	13,122	37,485	68,344	93,051	94,914	87,022	95,385	133,172	173,283	205,989	241,239	147,617
Sapporo	札幌	1,785	15,041	16,876	27,694	37,482	55,304	70,084	96,924	102,580	145,065	168,575	196,541	206,103	225,842	220,139
Sakai	堺	38,838	44,015	48,165	46,138	50,203	54,040	61,103	67,706	84,999	105,009	120,347	141,286	182,147	217,939	168,348
Shizuoka	静岡	31,555	36,838	37,664	37,096	42,172	48,744	53,614	64,108	74,093	84,772	136,481	200,737	212,198	211,666	161,720
Kumamoto	熊本	44,620	44,384	52,833	62,432	61,463	59,717	61,233	68,167	70,388	147,174	164,449	187,382	194,193	211,011	181,128
Akamazeki/ Shimonoseki	赤間関/ 下関	18,500	30,825	29,919	33,565	42,786	46,285	58,254	72,117	72,300	92,317	98,549	132,737	196,022	206,961	155,623
Wakayama	和歌山	61,124	54,868	56,713	55,726	63,667	68,527	77,303	77,683	83,500	95,622	117,437	179,732	195,203	205,396	147,523
Hakodate	函館	28,825	45,477	52,909	63,619	78,040	85,313	87,875	99,795	144,749	163,972	197,252	207,480	203,862	196,680	181,531
Kanazawa	金沢	109,685	97,653	94,257	91,531	83,662	99,657	110,994	129,804	129,265	147,420	157,309	163,733	186,297	193,560	200,584
Kagoshima	鹿児島	27,240	45,097	57,465	56,139	53,481	59,001	63,640	75,907	103,180	124,734	137,232	181,736	190,257	189,991	93,698
Niigata	新潟	33,152	40,778	46,353	49,700	53,366	59,576	61,616	66,622	92,130	108,941	125,106	134,992	150,903	177,289	174,170
Okayama	岡山	32,372	32,989	48,333	51,665	58,025	81,025	93,421	86,961	94,585	124,521	139,221	166,144	163,552	160,902	92,861
Toyama	富山	44,682	53,556	58,159	58,187	59,558	56,275	57,437	64,822	61,812	67,490	75,099	83,324	127,859	160,537	100,775
Otaru	小樽	3,903	15,882	12,629	34,259	56,961	79,361	91,281	92,864	108,113	134,469	144,884	153,587	164,282	151,905	145,510
Kōchi	高知	39,757	30,987	32,241	34,711	36,511	35,518	38,279	39,162	49,329	65,723	96,991	103,405	106,644	136,699	111,630
Tokushima	徳島	48,861	57,456	61,107	61,337	61,501	63,710	65,561	70,292	68,457	74,545	90,622	97,021	119,581	116,734	80,681
Takamatsu	高松	32,736	37,698	32,081	35,330	34,416	37,430	42,578	41,837	46,550	71,897	79,906	86,840	111,207	107,202	72,656
Fukui	福井	39,784	37,376	40,849	42,680	44,286	50,155	50,396	56,218	56,639	59,943	64,199	75,273	94,595	99,477	45,559
Akita	秋田	38,118	29,225	29,568	28,229	29,477	34,350	36,294	36,560	36,281	43,887	51,070	60,646	61,791	97,361	101,009
Matsue	松江	37,308	33,381	35,934	35,409	34,651	35,081	36,209	38,631	37,527	41,396	44,502	52,033	55,506	54,282	54,033
Hagi	萩	45,318	21,206	19,804	19,274	15,877	18,114	18,069	17,129	14,386	33,225	32,106	32,587	32,270	30,960	38,388
Shuri	首里	44,984	25,587	26,205	25,359	24,809	23,827	25,141	24,102	22,838	20,582	20,199	19,305	17,537	17,964	n.d.

In 1937 Japanese demographers projected the Japanese population in 1980 to reach 100,000,000, in accordance with observed growth rates.

== Japanese overseas possessions ==
Japan annexed Taiwan after the First Sino-Japanese War, while victory in the Russo-Japanese War gained Japan the Kwantung Leased Territory, Karafuto, and Chōsen. These acquisitions increased the area controlled by Japanese to 262,912 square miles (680,939 km^{2}).

The total population of the Empire of Japan, including Taiwan, Chōsen, and Karafuto was 64,940,034 on Dec 31, 1908, which could be broken down as follows:

- Japan proper: 51,742,486
- Chōsen: 9,918,566
- Taiwan: 3,252,589
- Karafuto: 26,393

And the population of concessions as of Dec 31, 1908, was as follows:

- Kwantung: 427,117
- South Manchuria Railway Zone: 28,307

Territory	1920-10-01	1925-10-01	1930-10-01	1935-10-01	1940-10-01	Area as of 1920 (km^{2})
Empire of Japan	76,988,379	83,456,929	90,396,043	97,697,555	103,727,610	674,612.076
Japan Proper	55,963,053	59,736,822	64,450,005	69,254,148	73,114,308	381,808.042
Taiwan	3,655,308	3,993,408	4,592,537	5,212,426	5,872,084	35,973.550
Chōsen	17,264,119	19,522,945	21,058,305	22,899,038	24,326,327	220,740.718
Karafuto	105,899	203,754	295,196	331,943	414,891	36,089.766
Concessions	919,568	1,054,074	1,328,011	1,656,726	1,367,334	4,168.804
Kwantung	688,130	765,776	955,741	1,134,081	1,367,334	3,374.655
Railway Zone	231,438	288,298	372,270	522,645	To Manchuria	242.149
Tsingtao	248,209	To Republic of China				552.000
South Pacific Mandate	52,222	56,294	69,626	102,537	131,258	2,514.026
Total	78,208,378	84,567,297	91,793,680	99,456,818	105,226,202	681,294.906

=== Census population in 1940 ===
- Japan proper: 73,114,308 (of whom 71,810,022 were Japanese, 1,241,315 were Koreans, 22,499 were Taiwanese, 986 were Karafuto natives, 249 were South Pacific natives and 39,237 of other nationalities).
- Manchukuo: 41,080,907 inhabitants, including 38,880,542 Hans and Manchurian, 1,309,000 Koreans, 819,582 Japanese, 5,000 Taiwanese and 66,783 of other nationalities;
- Chōsen: 24,326,327 (of whom 707,742 were Japanese, 23,547,465 were Koreans, 226 were Taiwanese, 2 were South Pacific natives and 70,892 of other nationalities).
- Taiwan: 5,872,083 (of whom 312,386 were Japanese, 5,510,259 were Taiwanese, 2,376 were Koreans, and 46,834 Hans and 228 of other nationalities).
- Mengjiang: 5,525,833 with 5,019,987 Han, while the population of Mongolia was 154,203.
- Karafuto: 414,892 (of whom 394,603 were Japanese, 19,505 were Koreans, 396 were Karafuto natives, 35 were Taiwanese, and 352 of other nationalities).
- Chishima Islands: 10,972
- Kwantung: 1,367,334 (of whom 198,188 were Japanese, 6,384 were Koreans, 550 were Taiwanese, 1,158,083 were of Manchurian nationality, and 4,129 of other nationalities).
- South Seas Mandate: 131,258 (of whom 77,011 were Japanese, 50,648 were South Pacific natives, 3,472 were Koreans, 7 were Taiwanese, and 120 of other nationalities).

Total: 151,481,298 (of whom 74,319,534 were Japanese, 26,129,517 were Koreans, 5,538,576 were Taiwanese, 50,899 were South Pacific natives, 1,382 were Karafuto natives, 45,105,446 were of Manchurian and Han, and 154,203 of other nationalities).

=== Estimated populations in 1940 in other occupied territories ===
China-Nanking Republic: 182,604,000

Hainan Island: 2,200,000

Kwangchow: 1,238,000

Shantou: 237,000

Fuzhou: 223,000

Amoy: 113,000

Kinmen Island: 50,000

=== Urban population in overseas territories ===
In terms of cities, the population of major cities:

Rank	City	1890 census	1910 census	1920 census	1930 census	1940 census
1	Keijō	1,165,000	230,000	247,000	350,000	1,100,000
2	Fuzan	NA	81,000	74,000	130,000	400,000
3	Heijō	NA	40,000	60,000	137,000	286,000
4	Jinsen	NA	30,000	40,000	54,000	171,000
5	Taihoku	78,000	95,000	164,000	249,000	326,000
6	Tainan	NA	44,000	112,000	166,000	296,000
7	Kīrun	NA	NA	48,000	79,000	100,000

=== Taiwan and Korea ===
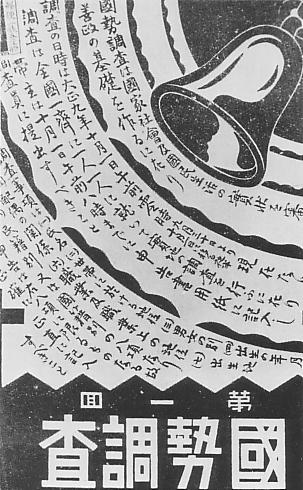
1st Census Poster

Year	Population (Taiwan)	Population (Korea)
1897	2,728,800	NA
1900	3,046,000	11,310,000
1920	3,654,900	17,264,100
1925	3,994,900	19,522,900
1930	4,679,100	21,058,300
1935	5,212,400	22,899,000
1940	5,872,100	24,730,000
1945	6,940,000	27,275,000

=== Manchukuo ===
By the time of 1908, the population of Manchuria was 15.83 million people and on October 1, 1932, when Manchukuo was founded, it had become 29,280,008 people. The population of Manchuria in early 1934 was estimated at 30,880,000. These numbers included 30,190,000 Chinese, 590,760 Japanese and 98,431 other nationalities (Russians, Mongols etc.). Chinese numbers included 680,000 ethnic Koreans. Approximately 300,000 men were added to the Japanese military garrison in 1937. Between 1938 and 1942, a contingent of 200,000 young farmers arrived in Manchukuo; joining this group after 1936, there were 20,000 complete families. In Shinkyō, the Japanese made up 25% of the population.

At the end of 1938, the total population of Manchukuo was estimated at 36,933,000, including approximately 1 million Japanese civilians and 500,000 Japanese military personnel. These figures exclude the rented territory of Kwantung and Dalian, which were included in Japanese territories abroad.

In 1940, the Manchurian State Council census had a population of 41,080,907 inhabitants, including 38,880,542 Hans and Manchurian, 1,309,000 Koreans, 819,582 Japanese, 5,000 Taiwanese and 66,783 of other nationalists; the proportion of men to women was 123.8 / 100.

As of October 1, 1942, the population had increased to 44,240,002 people.

At the end of the war, 850,000 Japanese migrants were arrested when the Soviet Union invaded Manchuria. Basically, with the exception of public and military officers, these people were repatriated in stages from 1946 to 1947 to Japan under Allied occupation.
