= Inoue Kowashi =

Japanese noble (1844–1895)

Viscount Inoue Kowashi
- 井上 毅
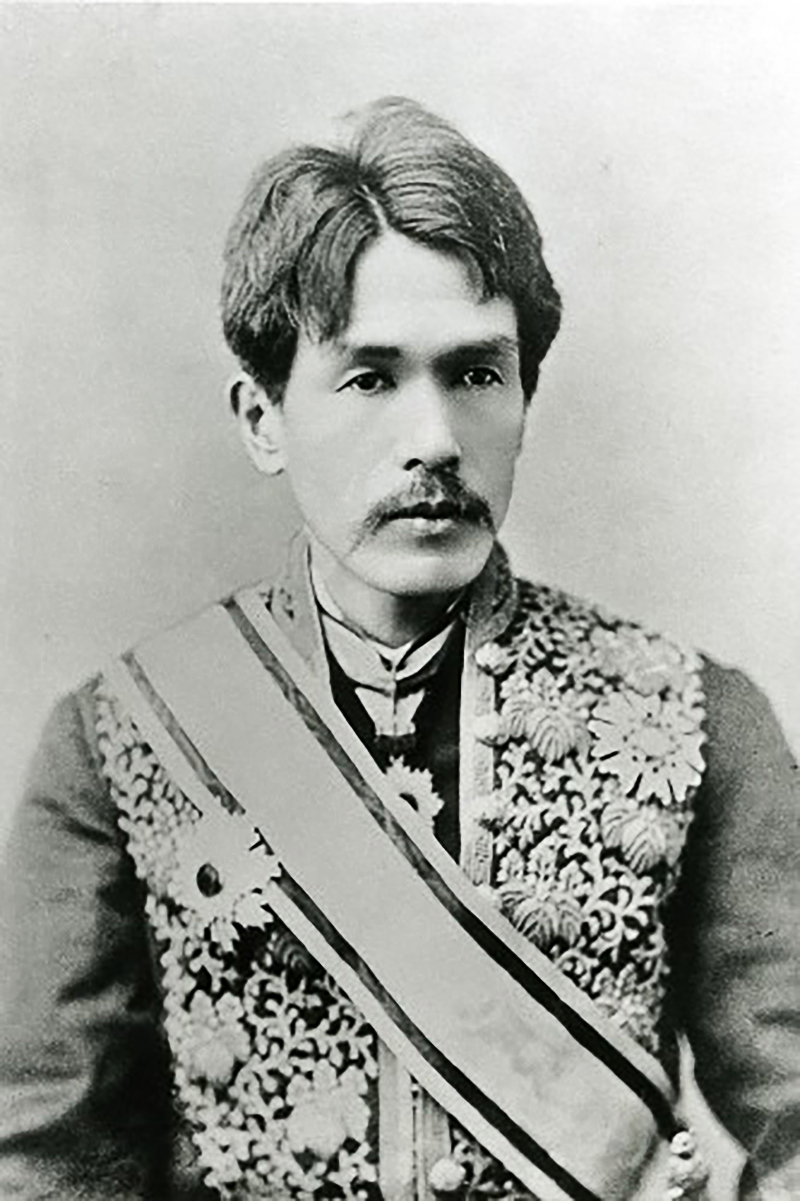
- A photograph of Inoue Kowashi from the Kokugakuin University Archives

Minister of Education
- In office 7 March 1893 – 29 August 1894
- Prime Minister: Itō Hirobumi
- Preceded by: Kōno Togama
- Succeeded by: Yoshikawa Akimasa (acting); Saionji Kinmochi

Director-General of the Legislative Bureau
- In office 7 February 1888 – 8 May 1891
- Prime Minister: Itō Hirobumi; Kuroda Kiyotaka; Yamagata Aritomo
- Preceded by: Yamao Yōzō
- Succeeded by: Saburō Ozaki

Member of the Privy Council
- In office 19 July 1890 – 7 March 1893
- Monarch: Meiji

Personal details
- Born: 6 February 1844 Kumamoto, Higo, Japan
- Died: 15 March 1895 (aged 51) Zushi, Kanagawa, Japan
- Education: Jishūkan

Viscount Inoue Kowashi (Japanese: 井上 毅; 6 February 1844 – 15 March 1895) was a Japanese statesman of the Meiji period.

== Early life ==
Inoue was born into a samurai family in Higo Province (present-day Kumamoto Prefecture), as the third son of Karō Iida Gongobei. In 1866 Kowashi was adopted by Inoue Shigesaburō, another retainer of the Nagaoka daimyō. Known as a highly intelligent child, Inoue entered the domain's Confucian academy, eventually becoming one of the academy's resident students. He fought on the imperial side in the Boshin War to overthrow the Tokugawa bakufu.

== Meiji bureaucrat ==
After the Meiji Restoration, Inoue joined the Ministry of Justice, and was sent to Germany and France for studies. He became a protégé of Ōkubo Toshimichi, and accompanied him to Beijing (China) for negotiations with the Qing court following the Taiwan Expedition of 1874. After Ōkubo's assassination, he worked closely with Itō Hirobumi and Iwakura Tomomi, and became a member of the Genrōin.

In 1875, based upon his experiences in Europe, Inoue published two volumes of documents called Ōkoku Kenkoku Hō (憲法意見控) ("Constitutions for Kingdoms"), which was primarily a translation of the Prussian and Belgian constitutions with Inoue's own commentary, which he submitted to Iwakura Tomomi. Iwakura recognized Inoue's talent and assigned him to work on the project for drafting a new constitution for Japan. Working with German legal advisor Karl Friedrich Hermann Roesler, Inoue worked on the drafts of the Meiji Constitution, and also drafts of the Imperial Household Law. He also cooperated with Motoda Nagazane in the preparation of the Imperial Rescript on Education.

In 1877 Inoue was appointed Chief Cabinet Secretary, in 1881 Chief Secretary to the House of Peers, in 1884 adjunct Chief Librarian of the Imperial Household Ministry, in 1888 Director General of the Cabinet Legislation Bureau. Inoue became a member of the Privy Council in 1890, and served as Minister of Education in the second Itō administration from 1893. In 1895, he was ennobled with the title of shishaku (viscount) in the kazoku peerage system.
