= Hermann Roesler =

Carl Friedrich Hermann Roesler
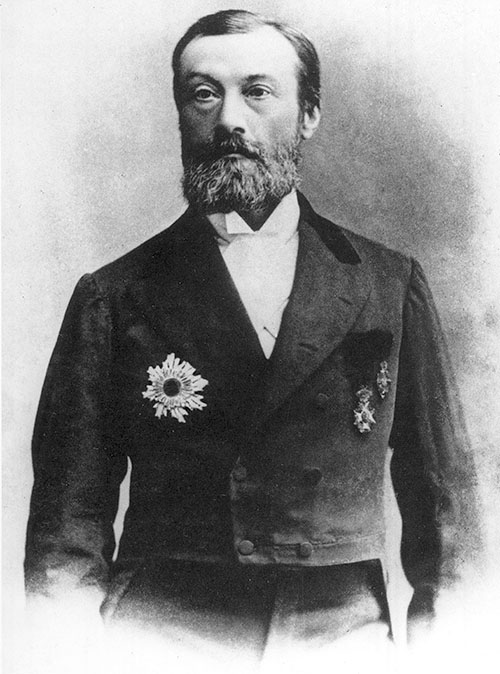
- Carl Friedrich Hermann Roesler
- Born: December 18, 1834; Lauf an der Pegnitz, German Confederation
- Died: December 2, 1894 (aged 59); Bolzano, Austria-Hungary
- Other names: Hermann Roesler
- Occupations: legal scholar, economist, foreign advisor to Japan
- Known for: Foreign advisor to Meiji Japan

Carl Friedrich Hermann Roesler (18 December 1834 – 2 December 1894) was a German legal scholar, economist, and foreign advisor to the Meiji period Empire of Japan.

== Biography ==
=== Life in Japan ===
In 1878, Roesler was invited by the government of Japan to serve as an advisor on international law to the Foreign Ministry. One compelling reason for his choice to move to Japan was due to his conversion to Roman Catholicism in 1878, Roesler faced dismissal from service in Mecklenburg due to his religion. A timely meeting with Japanese ambassador to Germany, Aoki Shūzō introduced Roesler to a new opportunity, and Roesler became one of several legal experts from Germany and France working on development of the Japanese legal system.

In 1884, Roesler became an adviser to the Japanese Cabinet. As the request of Itō Hirobumi Roesler assisted Inoue Kowashi and took an influential role in the preparation of the draft of the Japanese Commercial Code and the Constitution of the Empire of Japan.

From the time of the Iwakura mission, the Japanese ruling oligarchy had evaluated the various forms of government extant in Europe and America and were most impressed by the Austro-Germano-Prussian model, based on theories by Lorenz von Stein and Rudolf von Gneist and the organization of Prussian government designed by Albert Mosse. Roesler expanded on these theories, by recommending a constitutional monarchy in which the monarch was head of state, but not constrained by the legislature, whose primary responsibility was to provide advice and consent to the Emperor's rule, and not to govern the country or to promulgate laws. Moreover, sovereignty was with the Emperor and not with the people.

Roesler remained in Japan until 1893. While in Japan, relationship with the German legation in Japan and his socialization with the German expatriate community was almost non-existent.

After leaving Japan, Roesler and his family moved to Bolzano, then part of Austria-Hungary where he died shortly after.

== Works ==
- Lehrbuch des Deutschen Verwaltungsrechts (Textbook of Administrative Law). Erlangen: Deichert 1872 f.
- Die deutsche Nation und das Preußenthum (The German Nation and Prussianity). Zürich: Schmidt 1893.
