= Imperial Rescript on Education =

1890 edict in the Empire of Japan

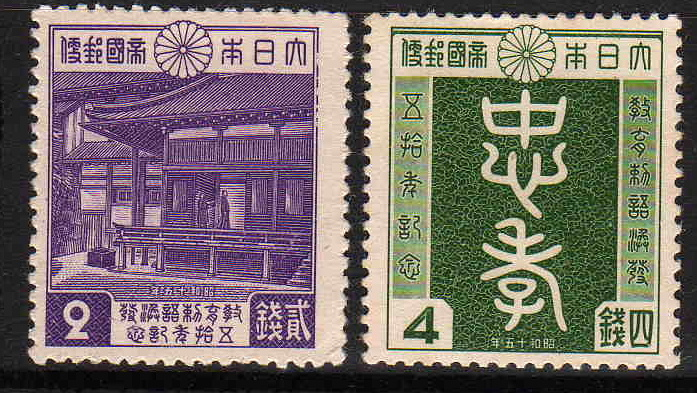
Commemorative stamps celebrating the 50th anniversary of the Imperial Rescript in 1940

The Imperial Rescript on Education (教育ニ関スル勅語, Kyōiku ni Kansuru Chokugo), or IRE for short, was signed by Emperor Meiji of Japan on 30 October 1890 to articulate government policy on the guiding principles of education on the Empire of Japan. The 315 character document was read aloud at all important school events, and students were required to study and memorize the text.

== Background ==
Following the Meiji Restoration, the leadership of the Meiji government felt the need to emphasize the common goals of rapid modernization (westernization) with support and legitimization of the political system centered on the imperial institution. In the 1870s and 1880s, Motoda Nagazane and other conservatives pushed for a revival of the principles of Confucianism as a guide for education and public morality; however, Inoue Kowashi and other proponents of the 'modernization' of Japan felt that this would encourage a return to the old feudal order, and pushed for an "emperor-centered" philosophy. Prime Minister Yamagata Aritomo authorized the drafting of the Rescript, which was a compromise written largely by Inoue Kowashi with input from Motoda Nagazane and others.

After it was issued, the Rescript was distributed to all schools in the country, together with a portrait of Emperor Meiji.

== Text ==
The text in Classical Japanese reads:

朕󠄂(チン)惟(オモ)フニ我(ワ)カ皇(クワウ)祖(ソ)皇(クワウ)宗(ソウ)國(クニ)ヲ肇󠄁(ハジ)ムルコト宏(クワウ)遠󠄁(ヱン)ニ德(トク)ヲ樹(タ)ツルコト深(シン)厚(コウ)ナリ我(ワ)カ臣(シン)民(ミン)克(ヨ)ク忠(チユウ)ニ克(ヨ)ク孝(カウ)ニ億(オク)兆(テウ)心(コヽロ)ヲ一(イツ)ニシテ世(ヨ)世(ヨ)厥(ソ)ノ美(ビ)ヲ濟(ナ)セルハ此(コ)レ我(ワ)カ國(コク)體(タイ)ノ精󠄀(セイ)華(クワ)ニシテ敎(ケウ)育(イク)ノ淵(エン)源(ゲン)亦(マタ)實(ジツ)ニ此(コヽ)ニ存(ソン)ス爾(ナンヂ)臣(シン)民(ミン)父󠄁(フ)母(ボ)ニ孝(カウ)ニ兄(ケイ)弟(テイ)ニ友(イウ)ニ夫(フウ)婦󠄁(フ)相(アヒ)和(ワ)シ朋󠄁(ホウ)友(イウ)相(アヒ)信(シン)シ恭(キヨウ)儉(ケン)己(オノ)レヲ持(ヂ)シ博󠄁(ハク)愛(アイ)衆󠄁(シユウ)ニ及󠄁(オヨ)ホシ學(ガク)ヲ修(ヲサ)メ業(ゲフ)ヲ習󠄁(ナラ)ヒ以(モツ)テ智(チ)能(ノウ)ヲ啓󠄁(ケイ)發(ハツ)シ德(トク)器󠄁(キ)ヲ成󠄁(ジヤウ)就(ジユ)シ進󠄁(スヽン)テ公󠄁(コウ)益󠄁(エキ)ヲ廣(ヒロ)メ世(セイ)務(ム)ヲ開(ヒラ)キ常(ツネ)ニ國(コク)憲󠄁(ケン)ヲ重(オモン)シ國(コク)法(ハフ)ニ遵󠄁(シタガ)ヒ一(イツ)旦(タン)緩󠄁(クワン)急󠄁(キフ)アレハ義(ギ)勇󠄁(ユウ)公󠄁(コウ)ニ奉(ホウ)シ以(モツ)テ天(テン)壤(ジヤウ)無(ム)窮󠄁(キユウ)ノ皇(クワウ)運󠄁(ウン)ヲ扶(フ)翼󠄂(ヨク)スヘシ是(カク)ノ如(ゴト)キハ獨(ヒト)リ朕󠄂(チン)カ忠(チユウ)良(リヤウ)ノ臣(シン)民(ミン)タルノミナラス又󠄂(マタ)以(モツ)テ爾(ナンヂ)祖(ソ)先(セン)ノ遺󠄁(ヰ)風(フウ)ヲ顯(ケン)彰(シヤウ)スルニ足(タ)ラン
斯(コ)ノ道󠄁(ミチ)ハ實(ジツ)ニ我(ワ)カ皇(クワウ)祖(ソ)皇(クワウ)宗(ソウ)ノ遺󠄁(ヰ)訓(クン)ニシテ子(シ)孫(ソン)臣(シン)民(ミン)ノ俱(トモ)ニ遵󠄁(ジユン)守(シュ)スヘキ所󠄁(トコロ)之(コレ)ヲ古(コ)今(コン)ニ通󠄁(ツウ)シテ謬(アヤマ)ラス之(コレ)ヲ中(チユウ)外(グワイ)ニ施(ホドコ)シテ悖(モト)ラス朕󠄂(チン)爾(ナンヂ)臣(シン)民(ミン)ト俱(トモ)ニ拳󠄁(ケン)拳󠄁(ケン)服󠄁(フク)膺(ヨウ)シテ咸(ミナ)其(ソノ)德(トク)ヲ一(イツ)ニセンコトヲ庶󠄂(コヒ)幾(ネガ)フ

明󠄁治二十三年十月󠄁三十日
御名御璽

Translated into English:

Know ye, Our subjects: Our Imperial Ancestors have founded Our Empire on a basis broad and everlasting and have deeply and firmly implanted virtue; Our subjects ever united in loyalty and filial piety have from generation to generation illustrated the beauty thereof. This is the glory of the fundamental character of Our Empire, and herein also lies the source of Our education. Ye, Our subjects, be filial to your parents, affectionate to your brothers and sisters; as husbands and wives be harmonious, as friends true; bear yourselves in modesty and moderation; extend your benevolence to all; pursue learning and cultivate arts, and thereby develop intellectual faculties and perfect moral powers; furthermore advance public good and promote common interests; always respect the Constitution and observe the laws; should emergency arise, offer yourselves courageously to the State; and thus guard and maintain the prosperity of Our Imperial Throne coeval with heaven and earth. So shall ye not only be Our good and faithful subjects, but render illustrious the best traditions of your forefathers. The Way here set forth is indeed the teaching bequeathed by Our Imperial Ancestors, to be observed alike by Their Descendants and the subjects, infallible for all ages and true in all places. It is Our wish to lay it to heart in all reverence, in common with you, Our subjects, that we may all thus attain to the same virtue.

The 30th day of the 10th month of the 23rd year of Meiji.

(Imperial Sign Manual. Imperial Seal.)

== Details ==
The Rescript pushed traditional ideals of Confucianism, and in many ways contributed to the rise of militarism during the 1930s and 40s. The Rescript requested of the people that they "furthermore advance public good and promote common interests; always respect the Constitution and observe the laws; should emergency arise, offer yourselves courageously to the State; and thus guard and maintain the prosperity of Our Imperial Throne coeval with heaven and earth".

The basis of the Rescript was that Japan's unique kokutai (system of government) was based on a historic bond between benevolent rulers and loyal subjects, and that the fundamental purpose of education was to cultivate virtues, especially loyalty and filial piety.

After the end of World War II in Asia following the surrender of Japan, the American occupation authorities forbade the formal reading of the Imperial Rescript in schools. The National Diet officially abolished it on 19 June 1948, with the House of Representatives adopting a resolution abolishing the Imperial Rescript on Education on the grounds that it undermined fundamental human rights based on its concepts of the rule of a sovereign and a mythological national structure, and the House of Councillors passing a resolution confirming its invalidity. For decades after the war, it was regarded in educational circles as a taboo educational philosophy.

=== Modern controversies ===
Despite its official abolition, the Imperial Rescript has occasionally resurfaced in political and educational discussions. In 2017, the Japanese Cabinet stated that use of the rescript as educational material would not be denied as long as it did not violate the Constitution, the Basic Act on Education, and other legal provisions. This followed controversy over footage of young children reciting portions of the rescript at a kindergarten in Osaka.

The right-wing populist party Sanseito, which gained seats in the July 2025 House of Councillors election, has advocated for "respect for the Imperial Rescript on Education" in their constitutional draft, proposing that "the Imperial Rescript on Education and other historical imperial edicts must be respected in education." This has drawn criticism from education officials and concerns about potential revival of prewar educational philosophies, though Minister of Education, Culture, Sports, Science and Technology Toshiko Abe has stated that "It is unacceptable to use the Imperial Rescript on Education in ways that contradict the Constitution and the Basic Act on Education."

== Kikuchi Dairoku and the Imperial Rescript on Education ==
In 1907, Kikuchi Dairoku was invited by the University of London to give lectures on education from the middle of February for about five months. The central focus of his lectures was the Imperial Rescript on Education. The request for the lectures was initially communicated to Hayashi Tadasu, then ambassador in London (from December 1905). At first Sawayanagi Matsutaro was to give the lectures, but he was recalled when in Rome on the way to London and Kikuchi gave the lectures instead. As a preparation for the lectures he translated the Imperial Rescript into English.

== See also ==
- Education in the Empire of Japan
- Ho an den: A temple or shrine-like small building that housed the Imperial Rescript on Education, together with a photograph of the Emperor and the Empress.
- Shotouka-Chiri official geography text

== Sources ==
- Japanese Students at Cambridge University in the Meiji Era, 1868–1912: Pioneers for the Modernization of Japan, by Noboru Koyama, translated by Ian Ruxton September 2004, ISBN 1-4116-1256-6).
