= Itō Hirobumi =

Japanese statesman (1841–1909)

Prince Itō Hirobumi
- 伊藤 博文
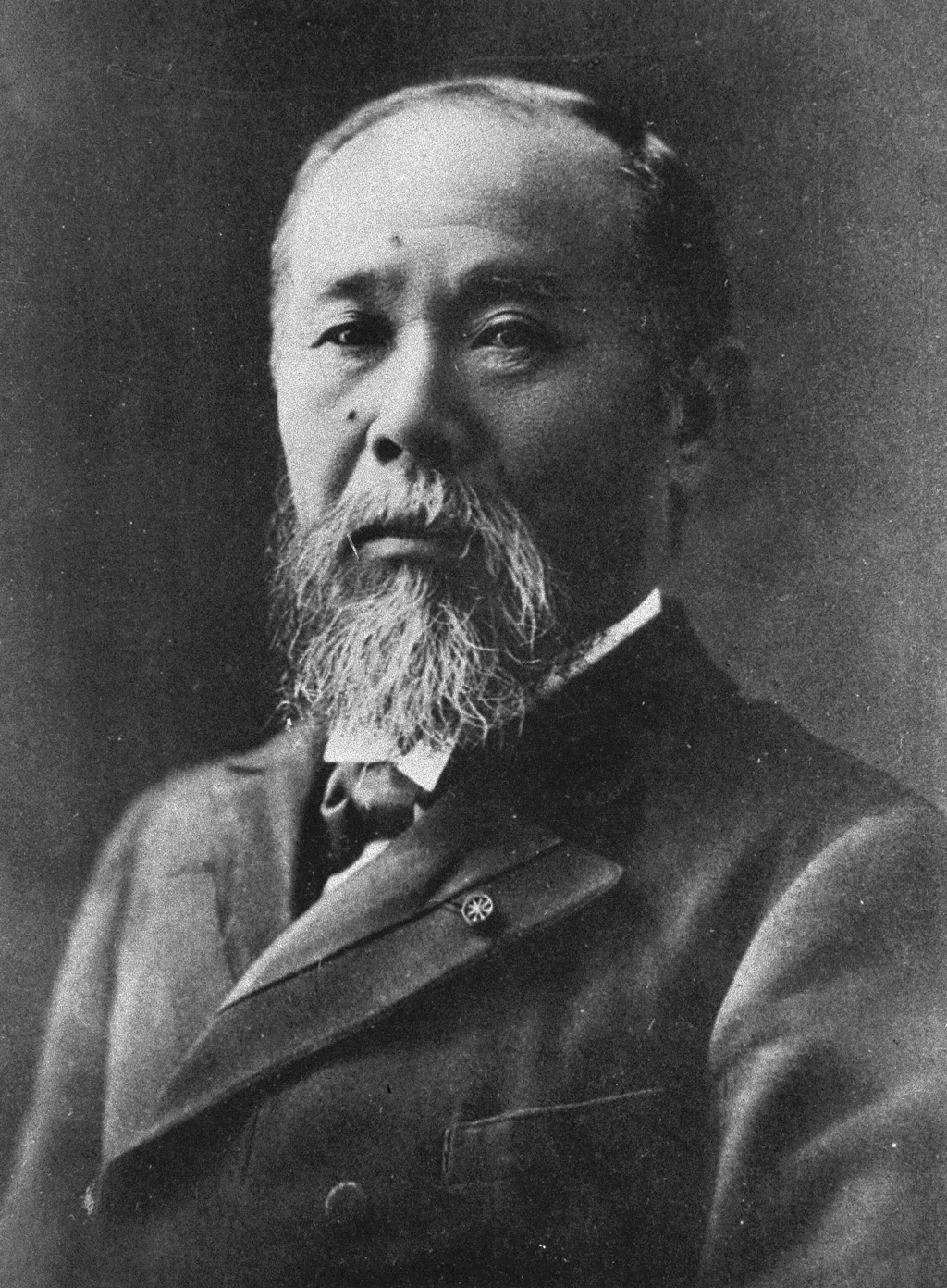
- Itō in 1900

Prime Minister of Japan
- In office 19 October 1900 – 10 May 1901
- Monarch: Meiji
- Preceded by: Yamagata Aritomo
- Succeeded by: Saionji Kinmochi (acting); Katsura Tarō
- In office 12 January 1898 – 30 June 1898
- Monarch: Meiji
- Preceded by: Matsukata Masayoshi
- Succeeded by: Ōkuma Shigenobu
- In office 8 August 1892 – 31 August 1896
- Monarch: Meiji
- Preceded by: Matsukata Masayoshi
- Succeeded by: Kuroda Kiyotaka (acting); Matsukata Masayoshi
- In office 22 December 1885 – 30 April 1888
- Monarch: Meiji
- Preceded by: Office established
- Succeeded by: Kuroda Kiyotaka

President of the Rikken Seiyūkai
- In office 15 September 1900 – 12 July 1903
- Preceded by: Position established
- Succeeded by: Saionji Kinmochi

Resident-General of Korea
- In office 21 December 1905 – 14 June 1909
- Monarch: Meiji
- Preceded by: Office established
- Succeeded by: Sone Arasuke
Privy Council offices
President of the Privy Council
In office 14 June 1909 – 26 October 1909
Monarch	Meiji
Vice President	Higashikuze Michitomi
Preceded by	Yamagata Aritomo
Succeeded by	Yamagata Aritomo
In office 13 July 1903 – 21 December 1905
Monarch	Meiji
Vice President	Higashikuze Michitomi
Preceded by	Saionji Kinmochi
Succeeded by	Yamagata Aritomo
In office 1 June 1891 – 8 August 1892
Monarch	Meiji
Vice President	Terashima Munenori; Soejima Taneomi; Higashikuze Michitomi
Preceded by	Oki Takato
Succeeded by	Oki Takato
In office 30 April 1888 – 30 October 1889
Monarch	Meiji
Vice President	Terashima Munenori
Preceded by	Office established
Succeeded by	Oki Takato
Member of the Privy Council
In office 9 January 1906 – 26 October 1909
Monarch	Meiji
Parlimentary offices
President of the House of Peers
In office 24 October 1890 – 21 July 1891
Monarch	Meiji
Vice President	Higashikuze Michitomi
Preceded by	Office established
Succeeded by	Hachisuka Mochiaki
Member of the House of Peers
In office 5 August 1895 – 26 October 1909 Hereditary peerage
In office 10 July 1890 – 21 July 1891 Elected by the Counts
Ministerial offices
Acting Minister for Foreign Affairs
In office 17 September 1887 – 1 February 1888
Prime Minister	Himself
Preceded by	Inoue Kaoru
Succeeded by	Ōkuma Shigenobu
Minister of the Imperial Household
In office 22 December 1885 – 16 September 1887
Monarch	Meiji
Preceded by	Office established
Succeeded by	Hijikata Hisamoto
Lord of Home Affairs
In office 15 May 1878 – 28 February 1880
Monarch	Meiji
Preceded by	Ōkubo Toshimichi
Succeeded by	Matsukata Masayoshi
In office 2 August 1874 – 28 November 1874
Monarch	Meiji
Preceded by	Ōkubo Toshimichi
Succeeded by	Ōkubo Toshimichi
Minister of Public Works
In office 25 October 1873 – 15 May 1878
Monarch	Meiji
Preceded by	Office established
Succeeded by	Inoue Kaoru

Governor of Hyōgo Prefecture
- In office 12 July 1868 – 21 May 1869
- Monarch: Meiji
- Preceded by: Office established
- Succeeded by: Kitabatake Michishiro

Personal details
- Born: Hayashi Risuke; 16 October 1841 Tsukari, Suō, Japan
- Died: 26 October 1909 (aged 68) Harbin, Heilongjiang, China
- Cause of death: Assassination by gunshot
- Resting place: Hirobumi Itō Cemetery, Tokyo
- Party: Rikken Seiyūkai (after 1900)
- Other political affiliations: Independent (before 1900)
- Spouse: Itō Umeko (m. 1866)
- Children: 5
- Education: University College London; Friedrich Wilhelm University of Berlin; University of Vienna
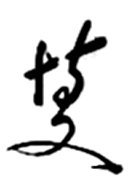
- Signature

Prince Itō Hirobumi (Japanese: 伊藤 博文 [i.toː (|) çi.ɾoꜜ.bɯ.mʲi]; born Hayashi Risuke (林 利助); 16 October 1841 – 26 October 1909) was a Japanese statesman who served as the first prime minister of Japan from 1885 to 1888. Itō held office again as prime minister three times between 1892 and 1901. He was also a member of the genrō, a group of senior statesmen who effectively dictated policy for the Empire of Japan during the Meiji era. A key figure in the making of modern Japan, Itō played a central role in the drafting of the 1889 Meiji Constitution as well as the establishment of the National Diet and Japanese cabinet system.

Born into a poor farming family in the Chōshū Domain, Itō Hirobumi and his father were adopted into a low-ranking samurai family. After the opening of Japan in 1854, he joined the nationalist sonnō jōi movement before being sent to England in 1863 to study at University College London. Following the Meiji Restoration of 1868, Itō was appointed a junior councilor for foreign affairs in the newly formed Empire of Japan. Later in 1870, he traveled to the United States to study Western currency, and subsequently helped establish Japan's modern banking and taxation systems. Itō then set off on another overseas trip with the Iwakura Mission to the U.S. and Europe. Upon his return to Japan in 1873, he became a full councilor and public works minister.

By the early 1880s, Itō emerged as the de facto leader of the Meiji oligarchy. In 1881, he was officially entrusted with overseeing the drafting of the Meiji Constitution. After traveling to Europe to study its nations' political systems, Itō settled on adopting a constitution emulating that of Prussia by reserving considerable power with the emperor while limiting political parties' involvement in government. In 1885, he replaced the Daijō-kan with a cabinet composed of ministry heads, and became Japan's first prime minister. After the Meiji Constitution was drafted in 1888, he established a supra-cabinet Privy Council led by himself to review it before its official promulgation in 1889. Even out of office as prime minister, Itō continued to exert significant influence on government policy as an imperial adviser, or genkun, and as President of the Privy Council. In 1900, he founded the Rikken Seiyūkai political party as party politics grew more prominent in the Diet.

On the world stage, Itō pursued an active foreign policy. He strengthened diplomatic ties with Western powers including Germany, the United States, and especially the United Kingdom. In Asia, he oversaw the First Sino-Japanese War and negotiated the surrender of China's ruling Qing dynasty on terms favorable to Japan, including the annexation of Taiwan and the release of Korea from the Chinese tributary system. After the Russo-Japanese War, the ensuing Japan–Korea Treaty of 1905 made Itō the first Resident-General of Korea. Despite initially supporting a protectorate rather than outright annexation of Korea, pressure from the Imperial Japanese Army leadership and the failure of his gradualist approach contributed to his support for annexation. Itō resigned as Resident-General in June 1909 only to be assassinated four months later by Korean-independence activist and nationalist An Jung-geun in Harbin, Manchuria.

== Early life and education ==
=== Origins and adoption ===
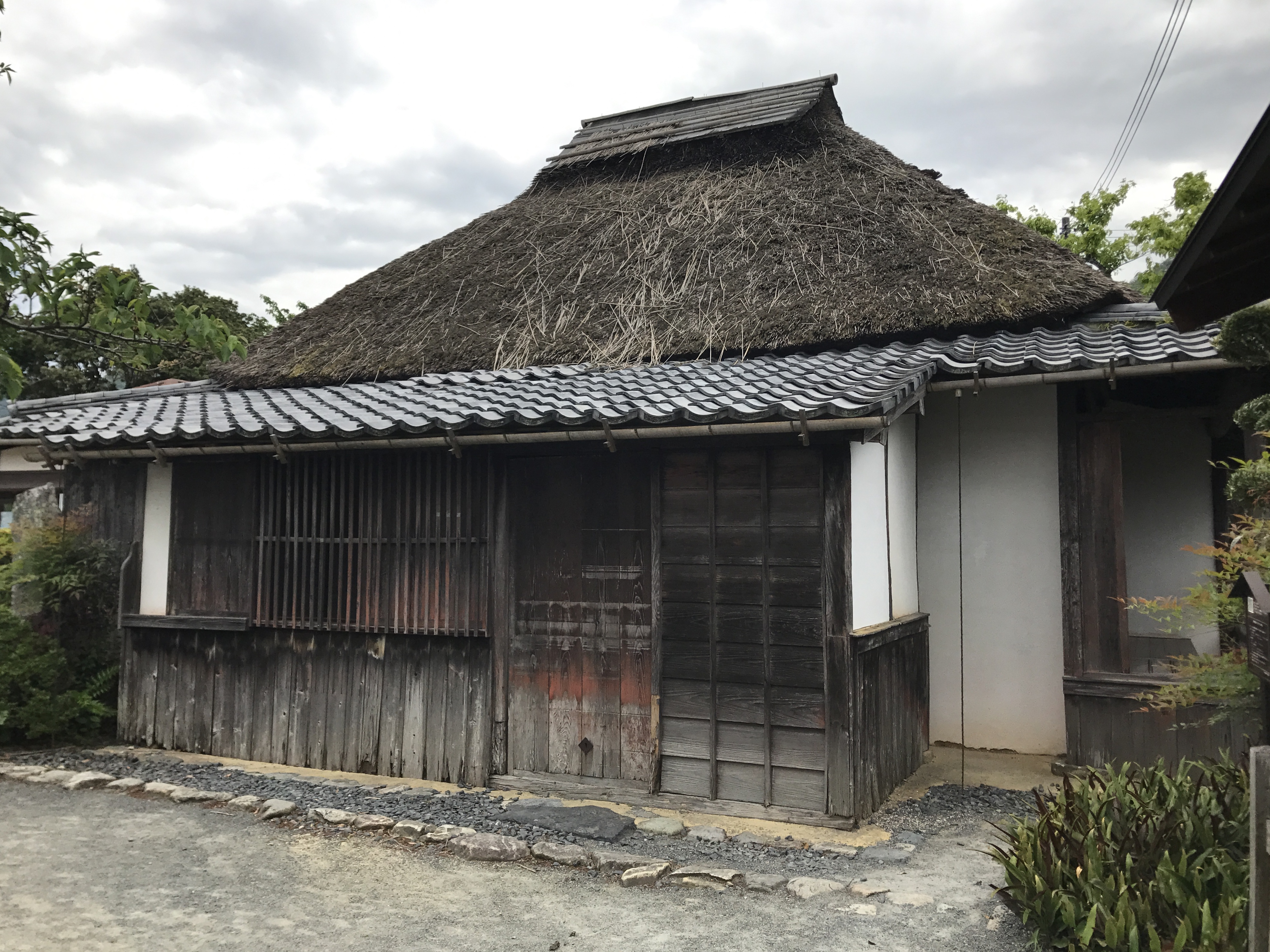
Itō's childhood home in Hagi, Yamaguchi Prefecture

Itō Hirobumi was born Hayashi Risuke on 16 October 1841 (Tenpō 12, 2nd day of the 9th month) in Tsukari village, Suō Province (present-day Hikari, Yamaguchi Prefecture), within the Chōshū Domain. He was the son of Hayashi Jūzō, a farmer of humble origins. His father served a low-ranking samurai named Itō Naoemon in the castle town of Hagi. When Hirobumi was very young, his father was adopted into the Itō family along with his household, granting them samurai status, albeit at the lowest rank of chūgen (foot soldier). After the adoption, Risuke's name was changed to Itō Risuke, then Itō Shunsuke in 1858, and finally to Hirobumi around 1869. The name "Hirobumi" (博文), meaning "extensive learning", was reportedly suggested by Takasugi Shinsaku and derived from The Analects of Confucius.

=== Yoshida Shōin and early activism ===
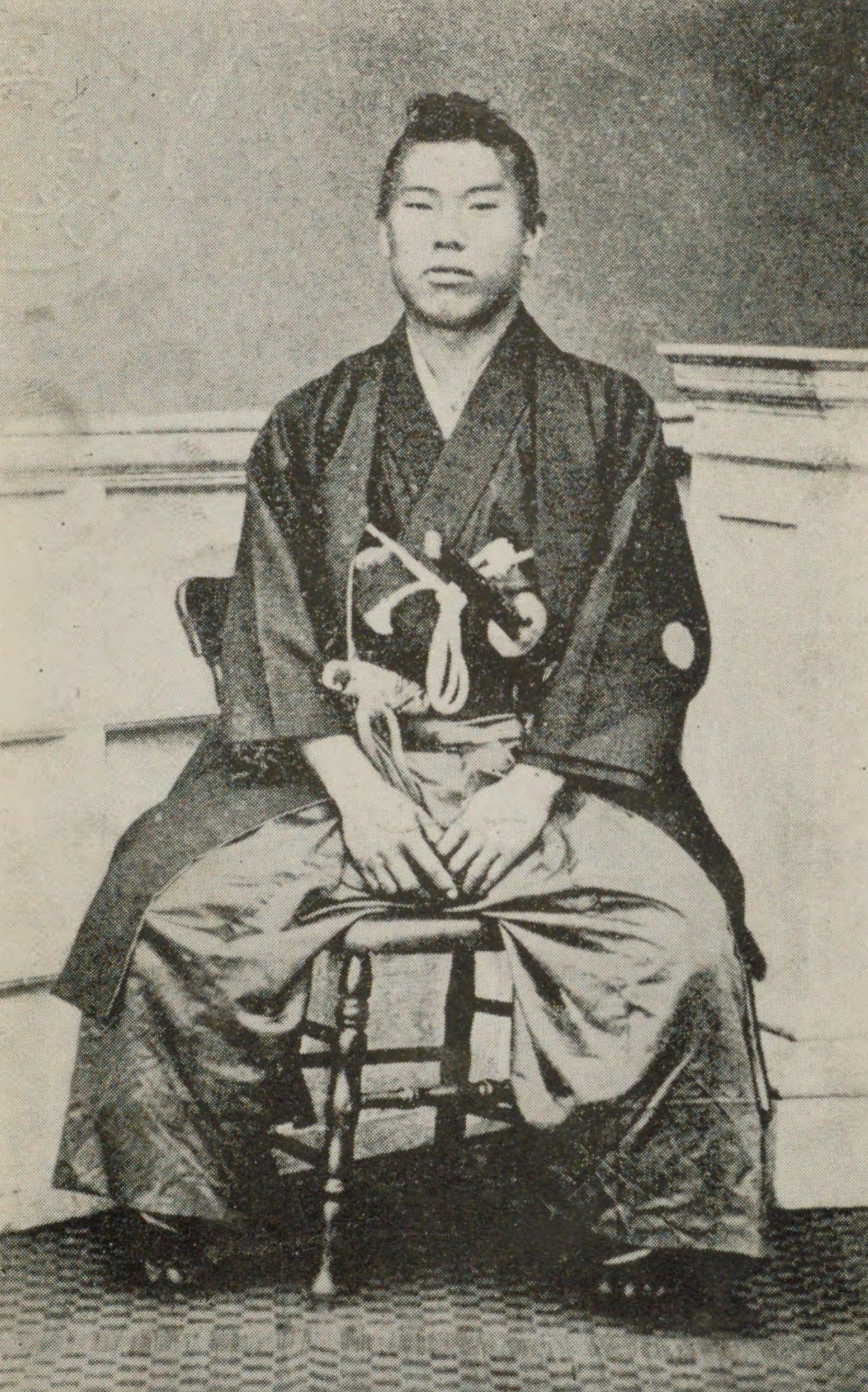
Itō as a young samurai, 1863

In 1856, Itō was sent for guard duty in Sagami Province. There, in 1857, Kuruhara Ryōzō, a brother-in-law of Kido Takayoshi, encouraged his intellectual pursuits. Later that year, Itō returned to Chōshū and, with Kuruhara's introduction, enrolled in the Shōka Sonjuku, a private academy run by the influential scholar and activist Yoshida Shōin. The academy educated several figures who later became prominent in the Meiji Restoration, including Takasugi Shinsaku and Yamagata Aritomo.

Yoshida Shōin's execution in the Ansei Purge of 1859 profoundly impacted Itō, who, along with Kido Takayoshi and others, retrieved Yoshida's body for burial. Following this, Itō became involved in the radical sonnō jōi (Revere the Emperor, Expel the Barbarians) movement. In 1862, he participated in an unsuccessful plot to assassinate Nagai Uta, a Chōshū official. Later that year, he took part in the burning of the British legation in Edo. Subsequently, along with Yamao Yōzō, he assassinated the Japanese classics scholar Hanawa Jirō Tadatomi, acting on a false report.

Despite his early immersion in Shōin's ideology, Itō later distanced himself from its radicalism, viewing the anti-Western sentiment of the era as "entirely emotional" and lacking "thoughtful political calculations". He came to admire figures like Nagai Uta for their pragmatic "political strategy", signaling his own developing preference for statesmanship grounded in realism.

=== Study in Britain and return ===
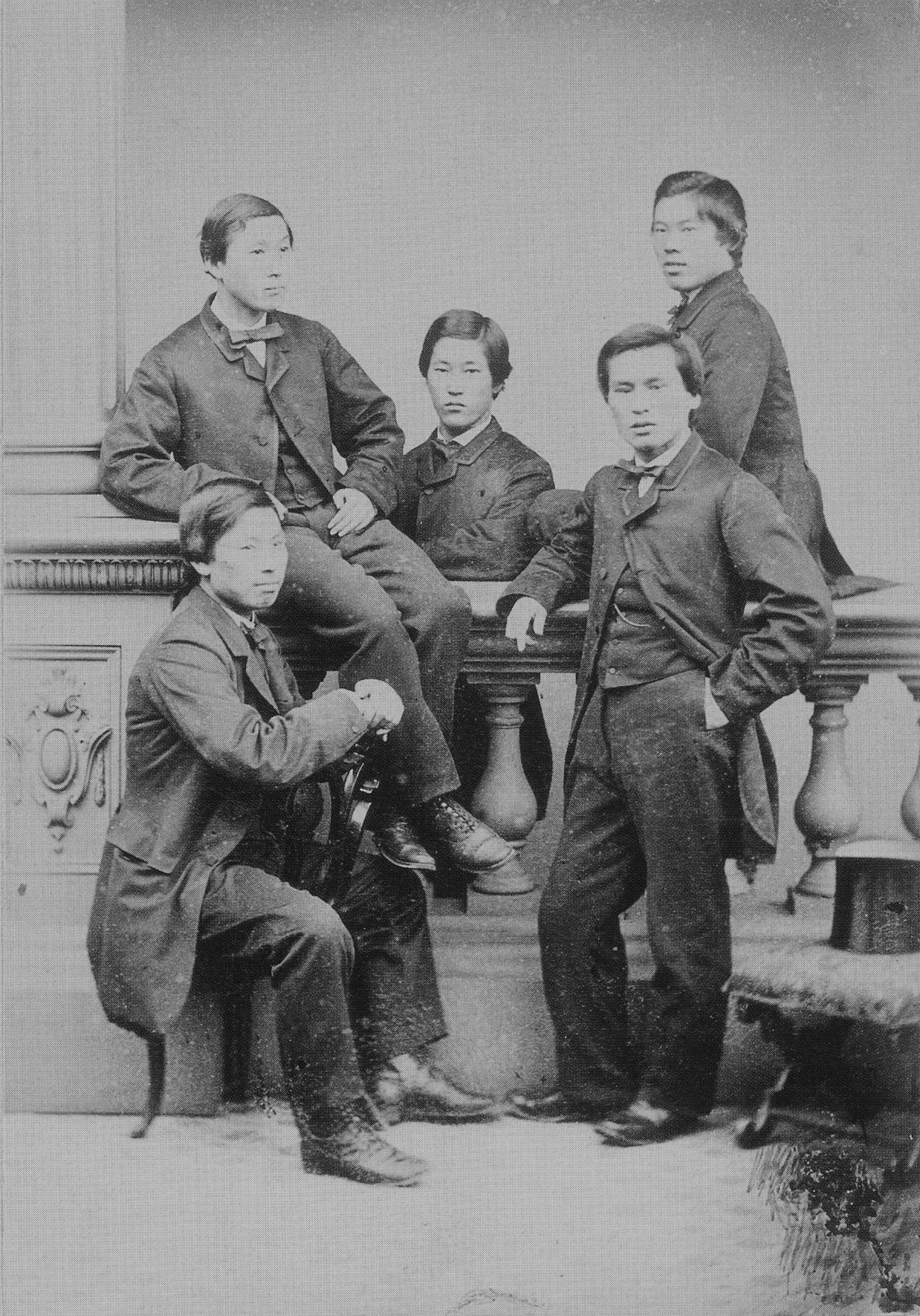
The "Chōshū Five", 1863. From left: Inoue Kaoru, Endō Kinsuke, Nomura Yakichi, Yamao Yōzō, and Itō.

Itō was selected as one of the Chōshū Five to secretly travel to Britain in 1863 for study, an act that violated the Tokugawa shogunate's ban on overseas travel. The Chōshū Domain's leadership, including Sufu Masanosuke, saw this as important for acquiring "human tools" and understanding Western civilization to prepare Japan for future international engagement. The five students departed Japan on 27 June 1863, arriving in London on 4 November. They commenced their studies at University College London, lodging with Professor Alexander Williamson and immersing themselves in English language and Western customs.

Itō's initial period of study in Britain was cut short. After about six months, he and Inoue Kaoru decided to return to Japan upon learning from The Times about the bombardment of Shimonoseki by Western powers and the conflict between the Satsuma Domain and a British naval squadron. Their aim was to persuade the Chōshū leaders of the impracticality of expelling foreigners.

This first overseas experience, though brief, is often described as an important influence on his later outlook. He returned to Japan in July 1864, during a period of national crisis. His firsthand knowledge of the West and his newly acquired English skills made him an invaluable asset. Following Chōshū's defeat by the allied Western naval forces at Shimonoseki, Itō served as a negotiator in the peace talks. This experience launched his career as a skilled negotiator, a talent Yoshida Shōin had earlier recognized. His time in Britain broadened his perspective and influenced his later approach to foreign affairs and state-building and a commitment to "extensive learning" (the meaning of "Hirobumi"). Itō developed a functional command of English, later delivering speeches in the language during the Iwakura Mission and maintaining a habit of reading English publications. He frequently gave interviews to Western media without an interpreter and conducted correspondence in English throughout his career.

== Early Meiji statesman ==
=== Rise in the Meiji government ===
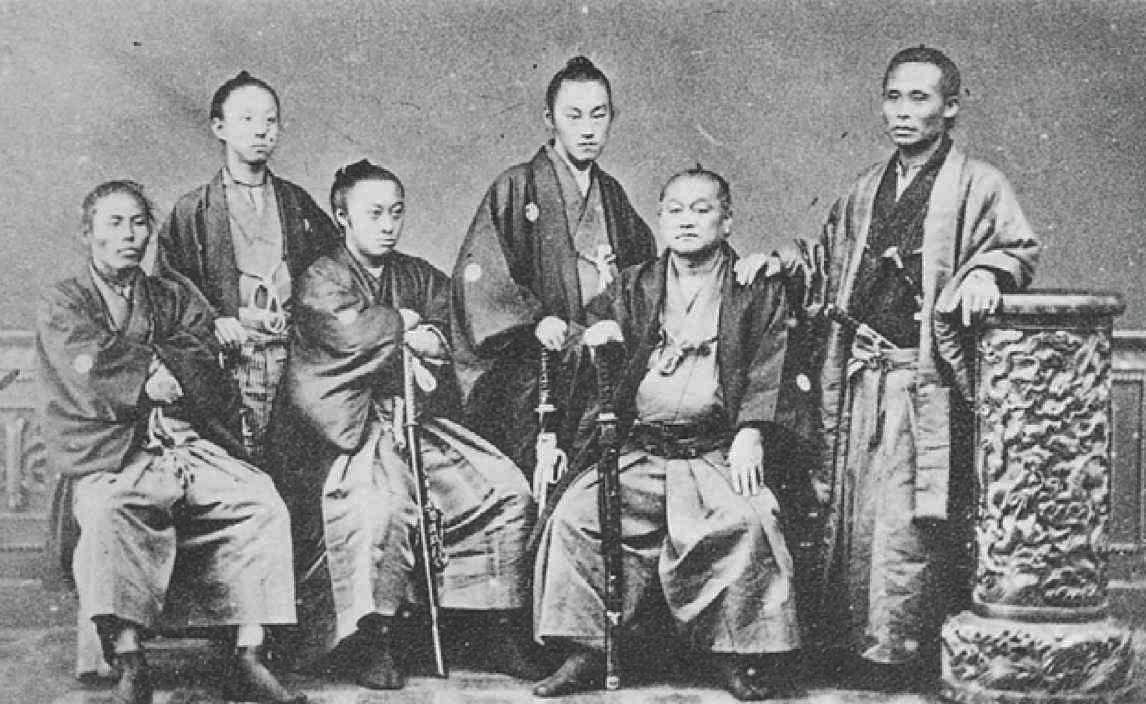
Samurai of the Chōshū and Satsuma Domains in 1869, with Itō on the far-left and Ōkubo Toshimichi on the far-right

After the Meiji Restoration in 1868, Itō's understanding of Western affairs became a significant asset, which contributed to his advancement in the new government. In February 1868, he was assigned to a role in foreign affairs. Later that year, he was appointed the first governor of Hyōgo Prefecture, which included the recently opened port of Kobe. This position placed him at the forefront of Japan's diplomatic and international trade activities.

In February 1869, Itō submitted a significant policy paper, "Principles for National Policy" (Kokuze kōmoku), also known as the "Hyōgo Proposal". This comprehensive six-point plan advocated for:

1. The establishment of a monarchy.
2. The centralization of political and military power under imperial rule, which included supporting the return of feudal domains to the emperor (hanseki hōkan).
3. Active engagement and interaction with foreign countries.
4. The elimination of traditional class distinctions and the granting of greater freedom to the populace.
5. The promotion of scientific learning and knowledge acquisition from around the world.
6. International cooperation and the definitive end of anti-foreignism (jōi).

The proposal strongly emphasized the necessity "to let people throughout Japan learn the science behind the scientific achievements of the world, thereby spreading knowledge of the natural sciences". He called for cultivating a "civilized and enlightened" populace and proposed the establishment of universities in Tokyo and Kyoto.

He referred to the United States as an example of national consolidation where national prosperity was driven by the "united hearts and minds of the people". He advocated for transcending narrow domainal loyalties to forge a cohesive Japanese national identity.

=== Financial and monetary reforms ===
In 1870, while serving as deputy vice-minister of finance, Itō traveled to the United States to study its financial and monetary institutions. This investigative tour, which lasted from December 1870 to June 1871, directly influenced the establishment of Japan's New Currency Regulation (Shinka Jōrei) in 1871. This legislation placed Japan on the gold standard, aligning its monetary system with those of Western nations. Itō was an advocate of this reform, dispatching a memorandum from the U.S. that argued for its adoption based on the successful experience of "civilized Western countries". While the move to the gold standard was considered radical by some contemporaries, the reform also incorporated elements of continuity with Japan's pre-existing monetary framework.

Itō also played a major role in the development of a modern banking system in Japan. He advocated for the creation of a bank of issue, and in December 1872, the National Bank Regulation (Kokuritsu Ginkō Jōrei) was promulgated, drawing inspiration from America's National Bank Act. His proposal envisioned a system where national banks would be authorized to issue banknotes backed by government bonds. This was part of a strategy to gradually replace inconvertible paper currency with banknotes convertible into specie. This methodical, step-by-step approach to monetary reform was an early example of the cautious gradualism that characterized his broader reform philosophy.

=== Iwakura Mission and shift to gradualism ===
Members of the Iwakura Mission in San Francisco, 1872. From left: Kido Takayoshi, Yamaguchi Naoyoshi, Iwakura Tomomi, Itō, and Ōkubo Toshimichi.

From late 1871 to 1873, Itō served as one of four deputy ambassadors in the Iwakura Mission, a comprehensive eighteen-month diplomatic and investigative tour of the United States and Europe. As a central member of the embassy, his ability to deliver speeches in English made him an important asset. The primary objectives of the mission were to initiate preliminary negotiations for the revision of the unequal treaties imposed on Japan by Western powers and to observe and study various aspects of Western civilization, including political systems, industry, and education. Itō had been a key proponent of such an undertaking, having earlier suggested sending government officials abroad to study treaty revision and related international practices.

During the mission's initial leg in the United States, Itō's English proficiency and confident demeanor were notable, although his assertive style occasionally caused friction with some colleagues, such as Sasaki Takayuki. In January 1872, at a welcoming event in San Francisco, he delivered a widely reported address, subsequently known as the "rising sun speech" (hinomaru enzetsu). In this speech, he proudly described Japan's rapid advancements in adopting Western institutions and proclaimed the nation's strong aspiration to achieve a high level of civilization and take its place among the advanced nations of the world.

A significant diplomatic misstep occurred in Washington D.C. when Itō and fellow deputy ambassador Ōkubo Toshimichi advocated for immediate treaty renegotiation with the United States, deviating from the mission's original plan to engage with Western powers collectively at a later stage. They even returned to Japan briefly to secure the necessary full Letters of Credence for this purpose. However, upon their return to Washington, they discovered that the other mission members, having become aware of the complexities and potential disadvantages of unilateral most-favored-nation clauses, had decided to adhere to the original strategy. This "Letters of Credence Incident" was criticized within the mission and strained his relationship with Kido Takayoshi, another influential member of the mission.

Despite this setback, the Iwakura Mission significantly influenced his political outlook. His direct observations of political conditions in Europe, including periods of instability in France and the intricacies of Otto von Bismarck's Germany, led him to a deeper appreciation for well-established institutions and a more measured, gradual approach to national reform. This experience solidified Itō's transition from a proponent of more radical reforms to an advocate for gradual, systematic institution-building, adapted to Japan's specific conditions.

== Father of the Meiji Constitution ==
=== Building the foundations (1873–1881) ===
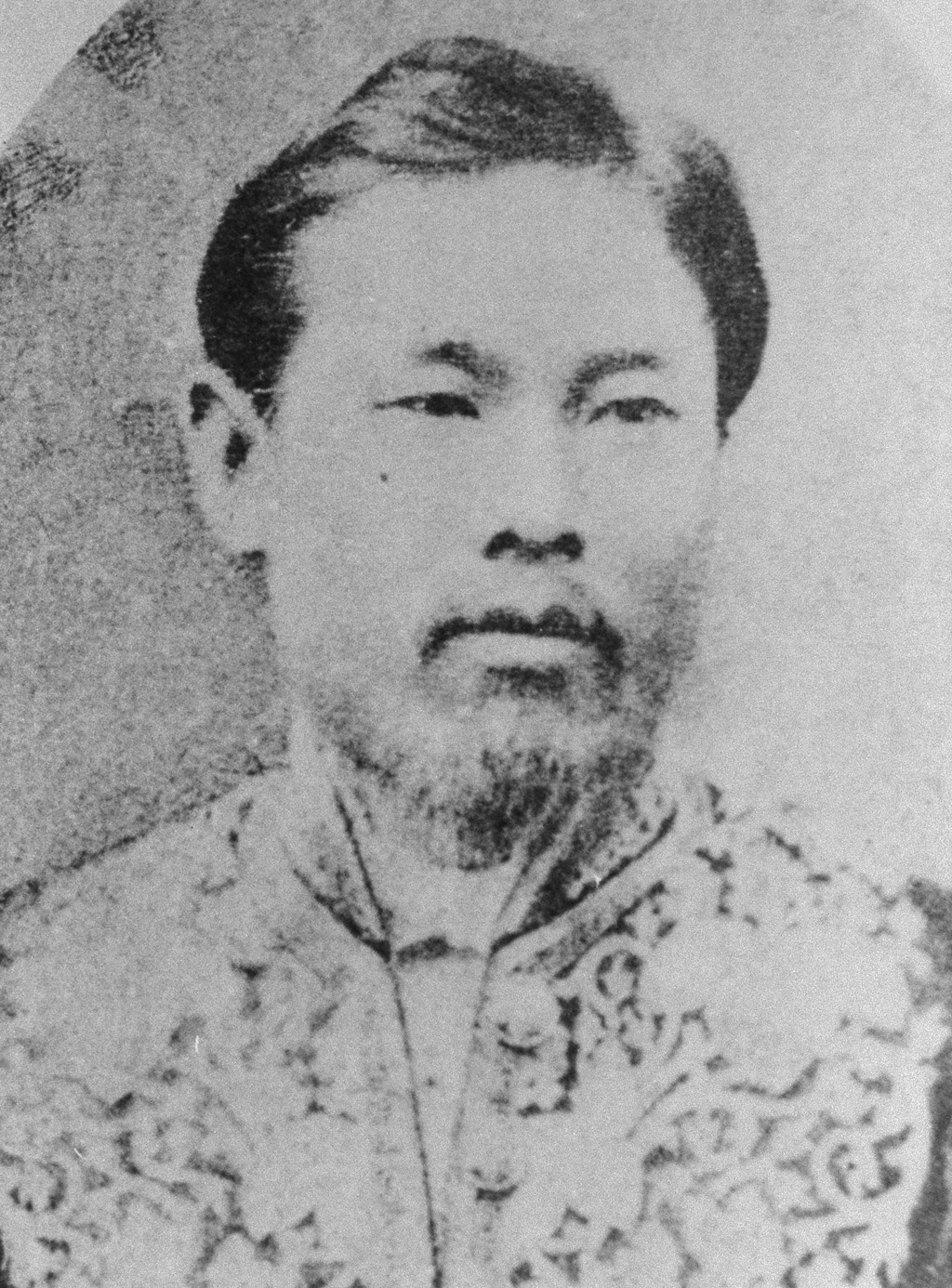
Itō in 1873

Upon his return to Japan from the Iwakura Mission in September 1873, Itō was immediately thrust into the intense political debate surrounding the Seikanron (debate over conquering Korea). He aligned himself with senior leaders like Iwakura Tomomi, Kido Takayoshi, and Ōkubo Toshimichi, who opposed a military expedition to Korea, advocating instead for a focus on domestic development and gradual reform. Following the "Political Crisis of 1873" (Meiji rokunen seihen), which saw the resignation of key proponents of the expedition, including Saigō Takamori, Itō was appointed as a councilor (sangi) and concurrently as minister of public works, solidifying his position as a key figure in the government.

In November 1873, Itō, along with Terashima Munenori, was tasked with "investigating constitutional government" (seitai torishirabe), marking the formal beginning of Japan's journey towards a written constitution. He was significantly influenced by the ideas of Kido and Ōkubo, both of whom submitted memorials to the throne advocating for the eventual establishment of a constitutional system that would include popular participation, to be achieved through a gradual process. Itō began to formulate concrete plans, proposing the convention of prefectural governors to form a lower assembly and the expansion of an existing imperial advisory body, the Jakō-no-ma, into an upper assembly. These initiatives culminated in the Osaka Conference of 1875, a meeting of key Meiji leaders that resulted in an imperial edict promising the gradual establishment of constitutional government. This edict led to the creation of the Assembly of Prefectural Governors and the Genrōin (Chamber of Elders), institutions Itō saw as precursors to a future parliament.

In an 1880 opinion paper on the future constitution, submitted to Emperor Meiji, Itō reiterated his cautious approach. He advised against hastily establishing a full-fledged parliament, proposing instead a further strengthening of the Genrōin and the introduction of a system of public auditors, selected from the general populace, to oversee fiscal matters and promote transparency. This proposal underscored his commitment to gradualism and his belief that the emperor should publicly demonstrate this principle of measured reform. His stance contrasted sharply with the Confucian moralism of court advisers like Motoda Eifu, who advocated for a state doctrine based on traditional ethics. Itō, in his 1879 paper "On Education" (Kyōiku-gi), argued against the state controlling a "national doctrine" (kokkyō). His primary concern was the destabilizing effect of widespread political debate among an unprepared populace; he therefore advocated for practical, secular education to curb this tendency, rather than for a state-sponsored moral code.

=== Political Crisis of 1881 and European tour ===
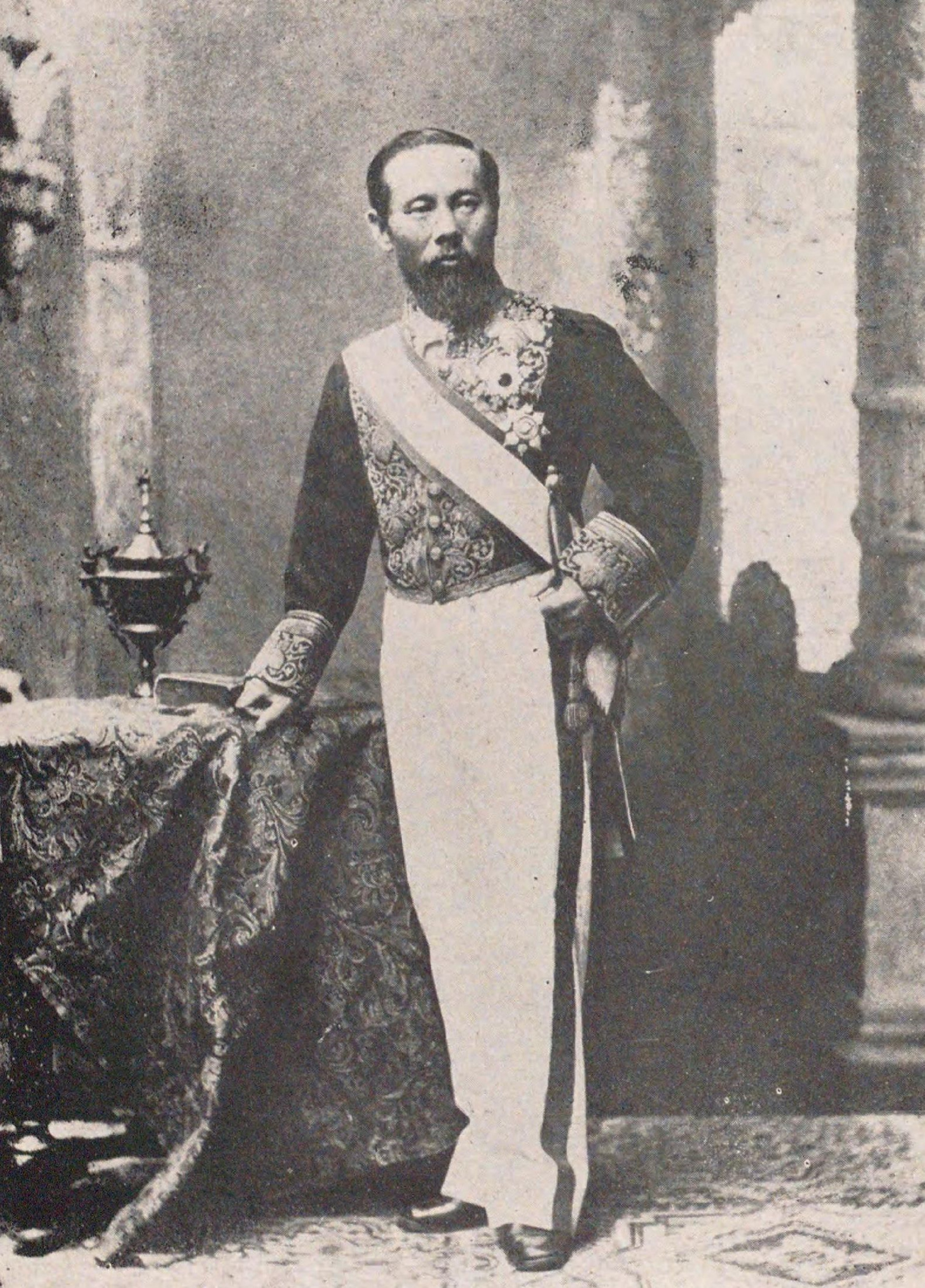
Itō in Berlin in 1883, during his constitutional study tour

The political landscape underwent a significant upheaval with the "Political Crisis of 1881". Councilor Ōkuma Shigenobu, one of the more "enlightened of the younger statesmen" along with Itō and Inoue Kaoru, controversially submitted a proposal directly to the throne advocating for the immediate adoption of a British-style parliamentary cabinet system and the rapid establishment of a national assembly, with elections to be held as early as the following year. This move, perceived as a challenge to the established oligarchic leadership and their gradualist approach, combined with public outcry over the "Hokkaido Colonization Office Scandal", significantly weakened Ōkuma's position within the government. Antagonized by Ōkuma's unilateral action, Itō exploited the ensuing political crisis, offering his own resignation to force the issue. He secured agreement from senior statesmen on a gradualist approach based on a Prussian-influenced model, thereby resolving the internal bureaucratic struggle over the type and timing of the constitution. Upon successfully pushing for Ōkuma's resignation, Itō emerged as first among equals within the Meiji oligarchy.

In March 1882, Itō embarked on an extensive year-and-a-half-long study tour of Europe, with the primary mission of researching various European constitutions and systems of government in preparation for drafting Japan's own. His objective was not merely to study constitutional texts but to understand how to effectively operate a constitutional state. The fundamental elements of the future constitution had already been decided upon before he left; the trip was intended to gather theoretical arguments and prestige to counter both liberal and conservative opposition at home. In Berlin, he attended lectures by the legal scholar Professor Rudolf von Gneist, but found Gneist's emphasis on historical jurisprudence and his skepticism about transplanting constitutional models less directly applicable to Japan's immediate needs. Itō encountered strong anti-parliamentarian sentiments in Germany, with both Gneist and even Kaiser Wilhelm I expressing reservations about the establishment of a powerful parliament, particularly in a nation without a long tradition of such institutions.

A more formative part of his European tour was his time in Vienna, beginning in August 1882, where he studied with the political economist Professor Lorenz von Stein. Stein's Staatswissenschaft (science of the state) had a profound impact on Itō. Stein's theories emphasized the critical role of effective state administration (Verwaltung) as a necessary complement to constitutional government (Verfassung), arguing for a system that could reconcile parliamentary mechanisms with the broader public interest and efficient governance of the state. This approach resonated deeply with Itō's pragmatic desire for practical guidelines for establishing and managing a constitutional state. Stein's ideas provided Itō with a sophisticated conceptual framework that moved beyond the abstract natural law theories then popular among some popular rights advocates in Japan, offering instead a model of a state grounded in administrative capacity and historical context. Furthermore, Stein stressed the importance of a robust system of education to support a constitutional state and cultivate an informed citizenry, reinforcing Itō's own belief in the importance of education for national development. Itō returned to Japan in August 1883, and resumed work on constitution-drafting with additional comparative research.

=== Drafting and promulgation, first premiership (1885–1888) ===
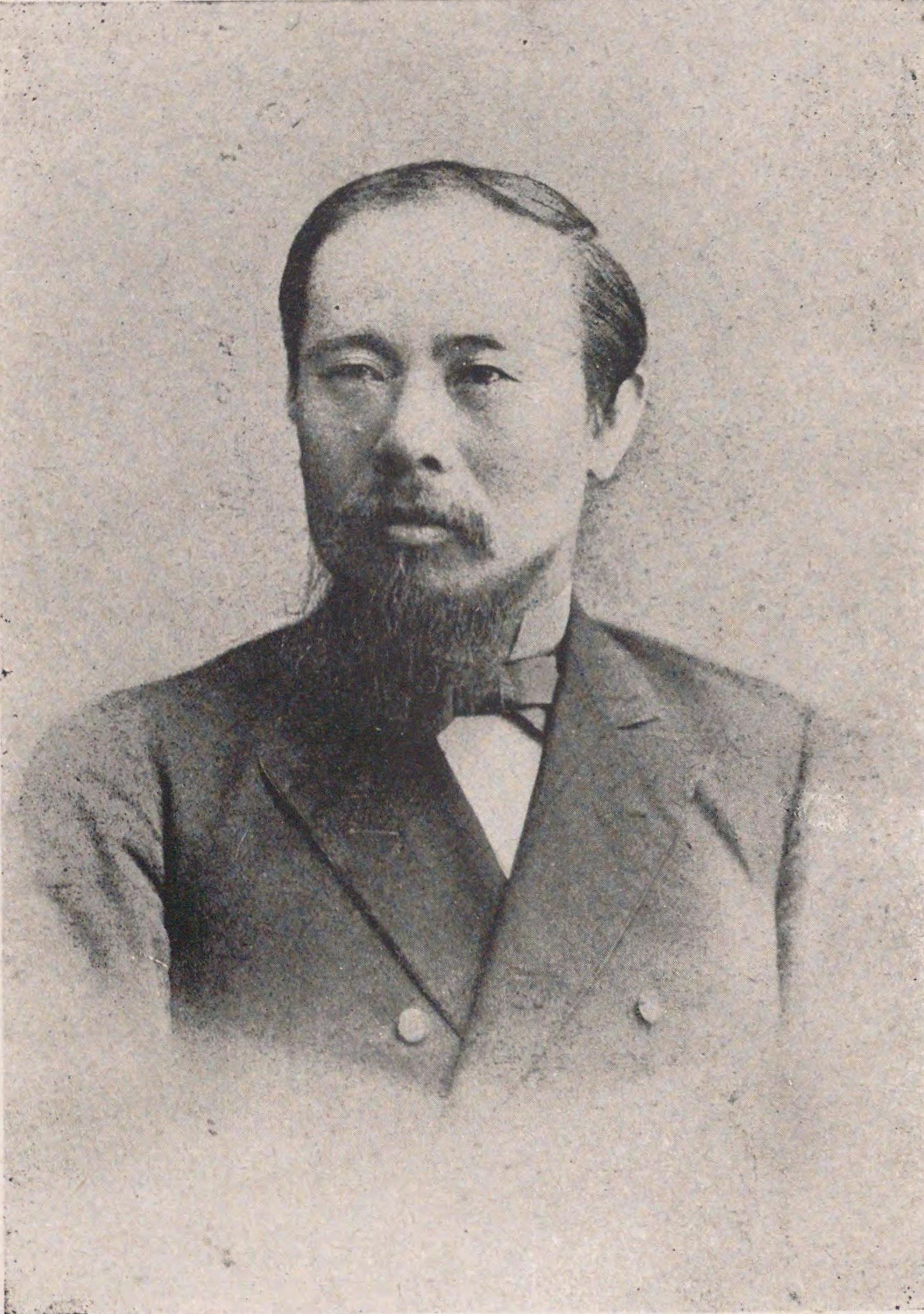
Itō in 1887

Upon his return from Europe, Itō assumed leadership of the newly established Bureau for Investigation of Constitutional Systems (Seido Torishirabe Kyoku) within the Imperial Household Agency in 1884. This body was specifically created to draft the constitution. He worked closely with a team of legal scholars and officials, including Inoue Kowashi (often considered the principal drafter of the text), Itō Miyoji, and Kaneko Kentarō. The German legal scholar Hermann Roesler also served as an important adviser, with his personal draft being extremely close to the final product. While Inoue Kowashi was a strong proponent of the German model, Itō's extensive research across Europe, including his period of study in London, contributed to a broader and more nuanced understanding of constitutional principles.

Several key institutional reforms led by Itō paved the way for the new constitutional order:

- Establishment of the cabinet system (1885): Itō spearheaded the creation of Japan's modern cabinet system, becoming the nation's first Prime Minister. This reform replaced the traditional Daijō-kan system as a means to create a strong executive branch capable of dealing with the future Diet. In principle, it opened cabinet positions to individuals beyond the traditional aristocracy, based on merit and ability.
- Founding of the Imperial University (1886): He established the Imperial University (later the University of Tokyo) with the specific aim of educating and training a competent bureaucratic elite to administer the modern state. Within the university, the Kokka Gakkai (Society for Staatswissenschaft) was founded, with Itō's support, to serve as a policy research institution and think-tank.
- Creation of the Privy Council (1888): After resigning as prime minister in April 1888, Itō became the first president of the Privy Council. This body was initially formed to deliberate on the draft constitution and the Imperial Household Law. Itō created it partly to bypass the more liberal-leaning Genrōin, which had produced its own draft constitution and claimed deliberative rights. He envisioned it as a high-level advisory body to the emperor on important political matters, serving to institutionalize the emperor's constitutional role while keeping the monarch separate from direct involvement in day-to-day political affairs and partisan disputes.

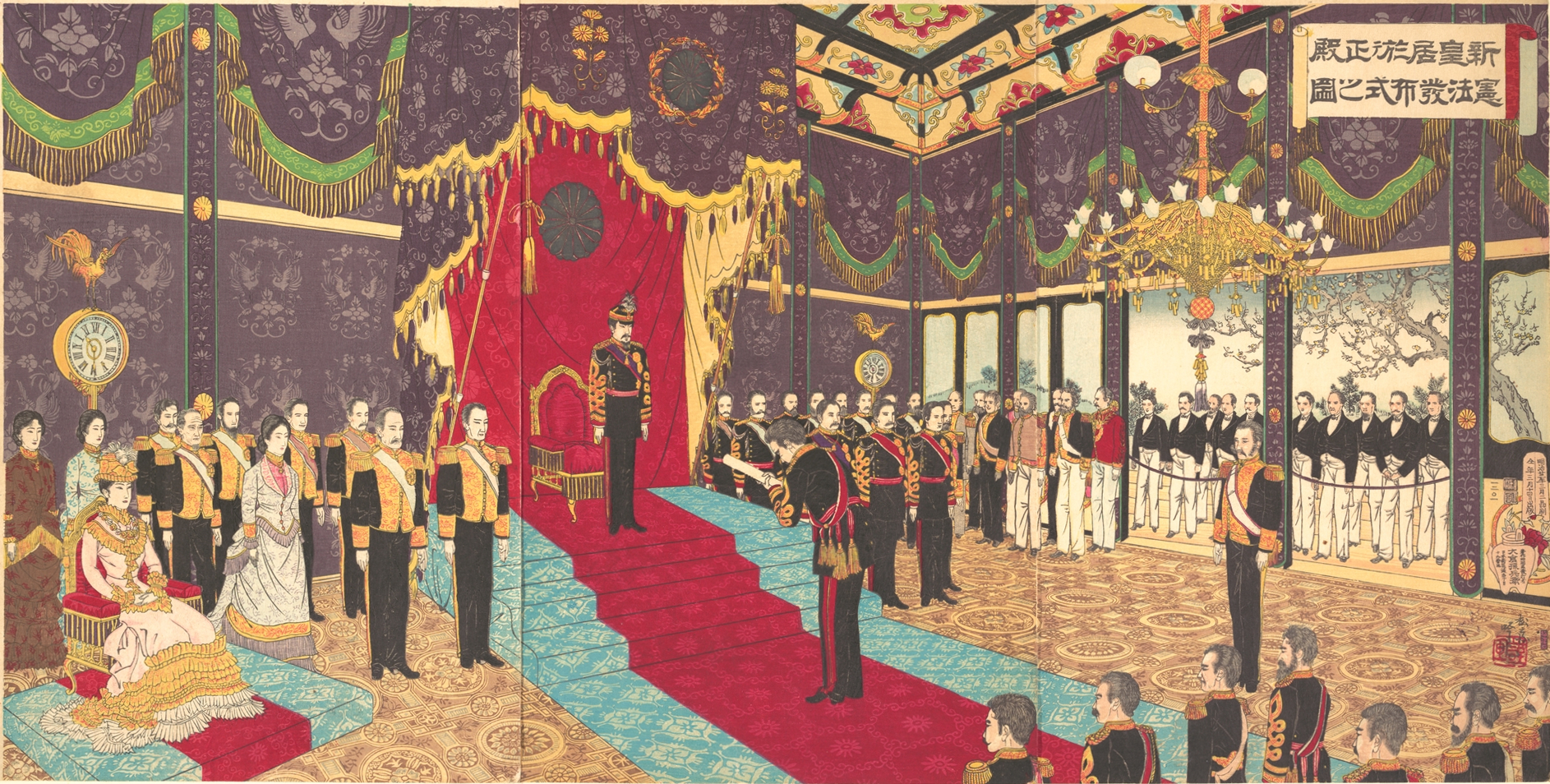
Ukiyo-e depicting the ceremony for the promulgation of the Meiji Constitution, 1889

The Meiji Constitution was officially promulgated on 11 February 1889. During the ceremony, Itō, as President of the Privy Council, handed the text of the Constitution to Emperor Meiji, who then handed it to Prime Minister Kuroda Kiyotaka. In speeches delivered shortly after, both Itō and Kuroda affirmed the principle of "transcendental" cabinets that stood above political parties, a final expression of the anti-party sentiment of the 1880s.

Itō emphasized that the constitution was granted by the Emperor, a framework rooted in Japan's unique national polity (kokutai). In a speech at Ōtsu, he explained that "as the supreme right is one and indivisible, the legislative power remains in the hands of the Sovereign and is not bestowed on the people." In his Commentaries on the Constitution (1889), he further argued against the theory of laws as contracts between the governing and the governed, asserting that "the legislative power is ultimately under the control of the Emperor, while the duty of the Diet is to give advice and consent." In a famous 1888 speech, he had described the imperial house as the "axis of the nation", a spiritual and historical anchor for the state equivalent to the role of Christianity in the West. His Commentaries blended references to Japan's mythical past with discussions of modern European statecraft. However, he consistently stressed that the constitution also guaranteed popular participation through the Diet and acknowledged the inevitable role of political parties. During the Privy Council debates on the constitution, Itō held his ground against more conservative figures like Mori Arinori, who argued for a purely advisory Diet, insisting that "if we want to establish a constitutional government, we have to give the right of decision to the Diet."

== Continued political career ==
=== Worldview and approach to governance ===
While he initially championed a "transcendental" cabinet that stood above partisan politics, Itō's experiences led him to acknowledge the inevitable rise and importance of political parties. Condemning what he termed "extremely democratic ideas," he believed them unsuitable for a compact nation like Japan that required "solidity of organization and the efficiency of its administrative activity." In an 1885 letter to Inoue Kaoru, he expressed his view that the arguments of party leader Itagaki Taisuke contained principles "completely incompatible with our nation" and were morally hazardous to the Imperial Household. A hallmark of Itō's political career was his pragmatism and his ability to adapt his views to changing circumstances, a trait that earned him the nickname "Round Itō" (Mārui Itō) from commentators like Tokutomi Sohō. He enjoyed a close personal relationship with Emperor Meiji, who often consulted him on practical matters of parliamentary politics, valuing his advice on how to manage the newly established Diet.

Itō's pragmatism was particularly evident in his evolving interpretation of kokutai (national polity). In an 1884 exchange with the conservative court official Sasaki Takayuki, Itō argued that kokutai was not immutable but was synonymous with the "national organization," including its land, people, and institutions, and would naturally change with the times. He viewed Sasaki's belief in an unchanging imperial line as the sole definition of kokutai as erroneous. However, by 1908, in a speech marking the twentieth anniversary of the Constitution's promulgation, Itō reversed his position, declaring that "constitutional government could never change the kokutai" and invoking the familiar rhetoric of an unbroken imperial line since Emperor Jimmu. This shift demonstrated his political acumen, adopting the now commonly accepted ideological line for the sake of national unity and political expediency.

=== Second and third premierships (1892–1896, 1898) ===
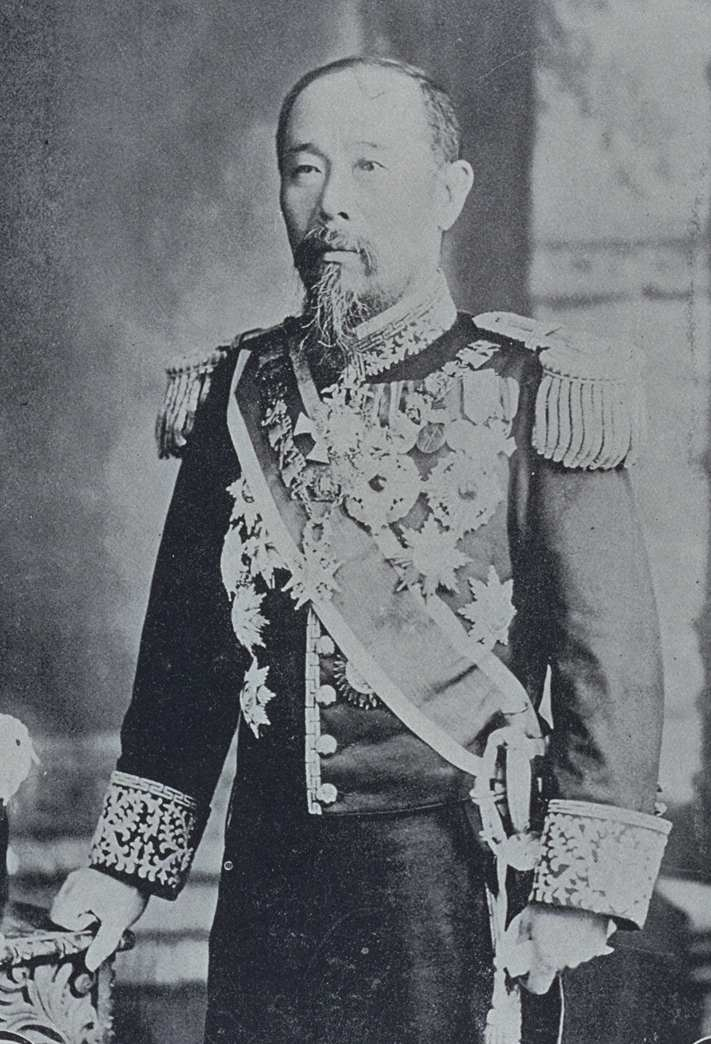
Itō in 1895

Itō remained a powerful figure even out of the Prime Minister's office, primarily through his leadership of the Privy Council. His influence was shaped by the deepening split within the oligarchy between his own "civil" faction and the "military" faction led by Yamagata Aritomo. The first session of the National Diet was held in November 1890. In August 1892, Itō formed his second cabinet, serving as prime minister until August 1896. His ideas had by then begun to diverge from those of his fellow oligarchs; while most still adhered to a strict policy of transcendental cabinets, Itō had reluctantly come to accept the necessity of establishing a government party. He had recommended this in a memorial to the Emperor as early as January 1892, but Yamagata and the other elder statesmen vetoed the idea, viewing it as a step towards British-style party cabinets.

This period was marked by the outbreak of the First Sino-Japanese War (1894–1895). Following Japan's victory, Itō was involved in the negotiations for the Treaty of Shimonoseki in 1895. His handling of the Diet during this premiership was characterized by pragmatic compromise. In the 1893 budget crisis, he defused an attack on the government by having the Emperor issue a rescript that called for fiscal responsibility from both the government (by contributing from imperial household funds for naval expansion and requiring officials to contribute a tenth of their salaries) and the Diet, a move that allowed both sides to save face. He twice dissolved the Diet (the fifth and sixth sessions) largely to demonstrate to foreign powers that his government was in firm control of anti-foreign elements, thereby smoothing the path for the crucial revision of the unequal treaties.

Itō formed his third cabinet in January 1898, aiming to secure the support of both the opposition Jiyūtō (Liberal) and Shimpotō (Progressive) parties, but failed to gain either. During this brief premiership, he expressed his intention to found a political party. However, facing difficulties in managing the government, opposition from figures like Yamagata to his party plans, and a failure to secure support from key industrialists, Itō dissolved the House of Representatives in June 1898. Later that month, with the merger of the Jiyūtō and Shimpōtō parties into the Kenseitō, Itō resigned as prime minister. In a political maneuver that outflanked Yamagata, he recommended that Ōkuma Shigenobu and Itagaki Taisuke form Japan's first party cabinet, thereby setting a precedent for party-based government that he would later capitalize on himself.

=== Relations with China ===
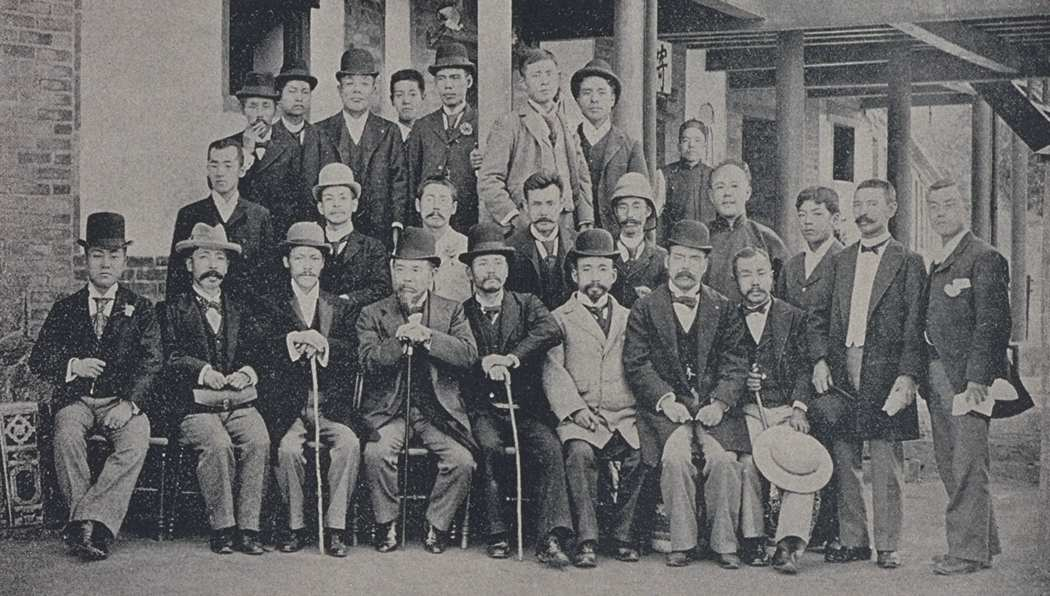
Itō with Japanese residents of Zhifu, China, during his 1898 visit. Itō is seated front row, fourth from left.

Itō Hirobumi's engagement with China was a significant, though complex, aspect of his later career, influencing his views on regional stability, economic development, and Japan's role in East Asia. His two-month visit to Korea and China in August–November 1898, undertaken shortly after the dissolution of his third cabinet, proved particularly formative.

During this trip, Itō was received by Chinese reformers, including Kang Youwei, who saw Meiji Japan as a model for China's own modernization. He arrived in Beijing at the height of the Hundred Days' Reform movement, led by the Guangxu Emperor. However, Itō found himself on the fringes of the 1898 coup engineered by Empress Dowager Cixi, which abruptly ended the reforms and led to the persecution of its leaders. While Itō was critical of the reformers' precipitous approach and maintained a cautious distance from their movement, he was deeply concerned by the ensuing political instability and the purge of reformist intellectuals. He intervened to help some reformers, like Liang Qichao, escape to Japan and advocated for the protection of others.

Itō's encounters with prominent Chinese officials like Zhang Zhidong, viceroy of Huguang, were particularly significant. Despite the political turmoil, Itō and Zhang shared views on their advocacy for gradual reform and their appreciation for Western science and technology, albeit within a framework that respected national context. Itō was particularly interested in Zhang's efforts to develop industry in the Hubei region, including the Hanyang Steel Mill. Their meeting facilitated an agreement for Japan's Yahata Steel Works to obtain iron ore from China's Daye mine, a development that marked the beginning of significant Japan-China economic cooperation in this sector, though it later became a point of contention in imperialistic narratives.

While pessimistic about China's immediate political future due to its internal divisions and the perceived rigidity of its institutions, Itō was highly optimistic about its economic potential. He believed that Japan, as a more advanced nation in the region, had a role to play in fostering economic ties and promoting "civilization" – by which he meant modern science, industry, and rational governance – in China. His vision for Japan involved steering clear of direct political interference in China while actively engaging with its economy, seeing mutual benefit in regional development. He consistently argued against territorial expansion for its own sake, emphasizing that economic prosperity and the exchange of knowledge were more important. However, he also spoke of Japan's "moral obligation" as a "pioneer of modernization" to guide China and Korea, a stance that, while framed in terms of shared progress, carried paternalistic undertones. His experiences in China in 1898 reinforced his belief in a gradual, education-focused approach to modernization and informed his strategy for Japan's engagement with the continent, emphasizing economic cooperation and the cultivation of a "nation of commerce".

=== Speaking tours, treaty revision, and foreign relations ===
Itō embarked on extensive speaking tours across Japan in 1899, the tenth anniversary of the promulgation of the Meiji Constitution. His aim was to explain the ideals of constitutionalism and popular government. He used a sophisticated media strategy, ensuring that reporters from newspapers like the Tōkyō Nichinichi Shinbun accompanied him, and his speeches were widely disseminated and even compiled into a book. In these speeches, he emphasized that the constitution guaranteed the people's right to participate in government.

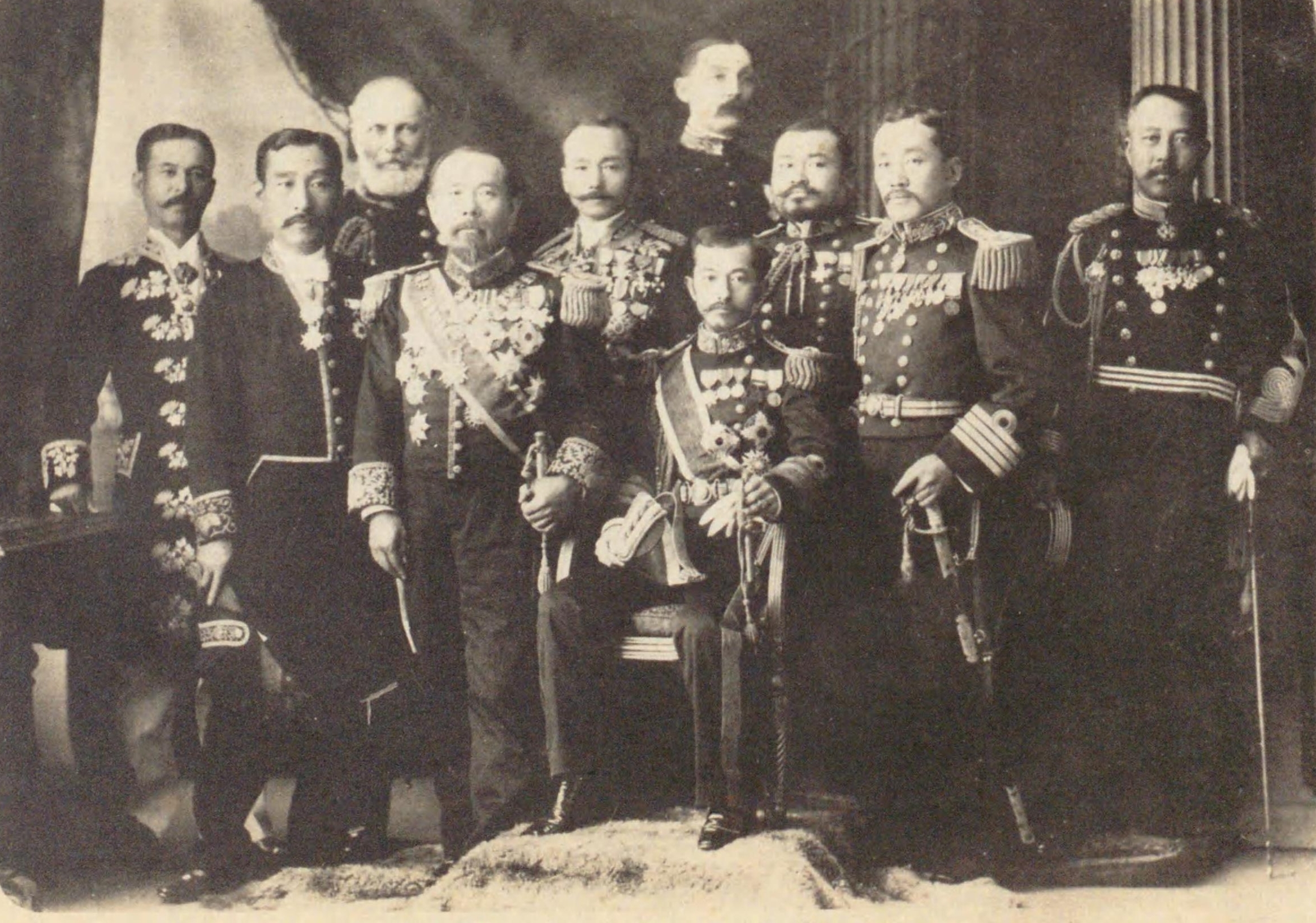
Itō (fourth from left) and other dignitaries attending the Diamond Jubilee of Queen Victoria in 1897

A major national goal during Itō's career was the revision of the unequal treaties imposed on Japan by Western powers in the mid-19th century. The new treaties, which abolished extraterritoriality and partially restored tariff autonomy, came into effect in July–August 1899. Itō saw this as a momentous occasion, marking Japan's full entry into the international community and the "mixed residence" (naichi zakkyo) of Japanese and foreigners. He countered fears of economic invasion by arguing that opening the country would facilitate Japan's economic growth through competition and the absorption of Western knowledge and experience. He argued that Japan should face the world "with the magnanimity of a great nation" and maintain its "civilized" status.

His views on patriotism (aikokushin) were pragmatic, emphasizing economic development and national wealth creation over ideological fervor or jingoism. "Without wealth the culture of the people cannot advance", he stated, advocating for patriotism that served practical ends.

== Founding of the Rikken Seiyūkai ==
Despite his earlier advocacy for a "transcendental" cabinet, Itō's thinking on the role of political parties evolved. He became increasingly dissatisfied with the existing state of party politics in Japan, which he viewed as fractious and often detrimental to national harmony and effective governance. His decision to form a new political party stemmed from a desire to reform party politics from within and to create an organization that could support his vision of constitutional government.

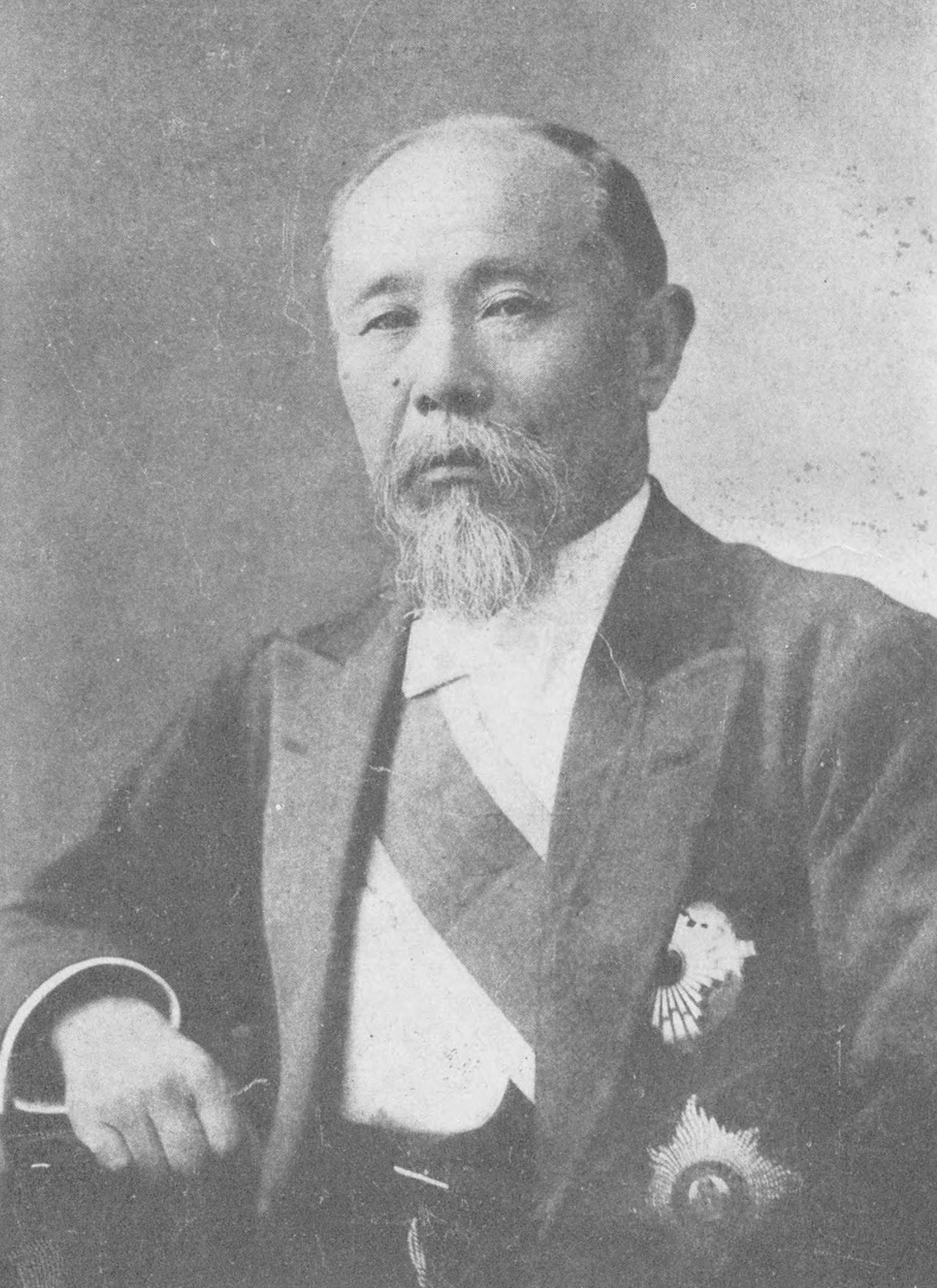
Itō as President of the Rikken Seiyūkai, 1903

In September 1900, Itō founded the Rikken Seiyūkai (Friends of Constitutional Government), becoming its first president. This marked the birth of Japan's first political party capable of taking the reins of government, and it became a dominant force in Japanese politics for decades, eventually evolving into the modern Liberal Democratic Party.

=== Motivations and ideals ===
Itō envisioned the Seiyūkai not merely as a vehicle for gaining political power but as a new kind of political organization – a "society" (kai) rather than a traditional "party" (tō), a term he felt carried connotations of self-serving factions (hōtō). He aimed to create an organization that could transcend narrow partisan interests and act for the public benefit. The decision was a pragmatic response to the political realities of the 1890s, where "transcendental" cabinets had repeatedly failed to secure stable majorities in the Diet, hindering governance and national progress. Itō believed that a responsible party should supply competent personnel to the cabinet and contribute to harmonious governance, rather than simply seeking to control the executive branch.

=== Formation, fourth premiership (1900–1901) ===
The formation of the Seiyūkai was not without difficulties. Itō's attempts to rally support from the business and financial communities met with limited success. Prominent figures like Shibusawa Eiichi, while sympathetic to Itō's policies, were hesitant to directly join the party, partly due to a traditional disdain among entrepreneurs for direct political involvement and partly due to interference from established political and business interests, such as those connected to Iwasaki Yanosuke, who was aligned with Ōkuma's Progressive Party. Ultimately, the Seiyūkai was formed largely on the existing organizational base of the Kenseitō (the former Liberal Party faction), led by figures like Hoshi Tōru. Itō attempted to disguise this fact, insisting that the Kenseitō formally dissolve before its members joined his new organization.

Itō's draft rules for the Seiyūkai emphasized several key principles:

1. The Emperor's prerogative in appointing cabinet ministers, with the party not opposing appointments from outside its ranks.
2. The cabinet's role as an advisory body to the Emperor and a body of responsible government, free from direct party interference.
3. A focus on administrative reform through the selection of competent individuals for government posts, regardless of party affiliation.
4. A commitment to acting for the public benefit and avoiding undue involvement in local interests.
5. Strong leadership by the party president in public pronouncements and parliamentary activities.

In a speech at the party's founding, Itō stated his constitutional philosophy, affirming that "the appointment and dismissal of Cabinet Ministers appertain, under the Constitution, to the prerogatives of the Sovereign," but that party members were not to "interfere in any manner with the discharge of their political duties." These rules reflected Itō's ideal of a party that maintained a distinction between itself and the cabinet, promoted national unity, and was led with clear authority and discipline. He advocated for a "salon-like" or club-style organization for the party's local branches to encourage broad participation and the free exchange of ideas, while simultaneously insisting on strong central leadership.

Soon after its founding, Itō formed his fourth cabinet in October 1900, with most ministerial posts filled by Seiyūkai members. However, this cabinet was short-lived, plagued by internal disunity, difficulties in managing party members' demands for posts, and conflict with the House of Peers, where ex-bureaucratic followers of Yamagata were particularly hostile to the inclusion of party politician Hoshi in the cabinet. After Hoshi was forced to resign, Itō's cabinet faced an internal conflict over financial policy, and he resigned as prime minister in June 1901, having failed to secure the approval of the other elder statesmen for a new, reorganized cabinet. He continued as president of the Seiyūkai but faced ongoing challenges in instilling his ideals of party discipline and national-level focus. Disappointment over issues like the government's signing of the Anglo-Japanese Alliance (which he had opposed in favor of a Russo-Japanese entente) and internal party conflicts led to his resignation as Seiyūkai president in July 1903, at which point he was reappointed President of the Privy Council. He was succeeded as party leader by Saionji Kinmochi.

== Constitutional Reforms of 1907 ==
Even after stepping down from active party leadership, Itō continued to be deeply involved in shaping Japan's constitutional framework. From 1903, as reappointed president of the Imperial Household Research Committee (which he had first headed in 1899), he embarked on a major project of constitutional reforms, culminating in significant legislative changes in 1907. These reforms aimed to consolidate the national structure, clarify the emperor's role, and strengthen the cabinet's authority in governance.

The committee's primary task, under Itō's guidance and with the detailed work of legal scholar Ariga Nagao, was to restructure the imperial household system and integrate it more fully as an organ of the state, rather than a separate entity. This involved revising the Imperial Household Law and establishing a unified system of national laws that clearly positioned the imperial household within the state's constitutional framework. The Kōshikirei Order (Order concerning Forms of Imperial Rescripts, Statutes, and Other State Documents) of 1907 was a key outcome, establishing procedures for issuing imperial edicts and revising fundamental laws, including the Meiji Constitution and the Imperial Household Law itself.

A crucial aspect of these reforms was the effort to bolster the power of the prime minister and the cabinet, particularly in relation to the military. The revised Cabinet Organization Order, implemented alongside the Kōshikirei Order, restored the requirement for the Prime Minister to countersign all laws and imperial ordinances, an attempt to curb the military's practice of iaku jōsō (direct appeal to the emperor on military matters, bypassing the cabinet). Itō envisioned a system of responsible government led by a strong cabinet, with the emperor acting as a constitutional monarch whose prerogatives were exercised in accordance with law and through designated state organs.

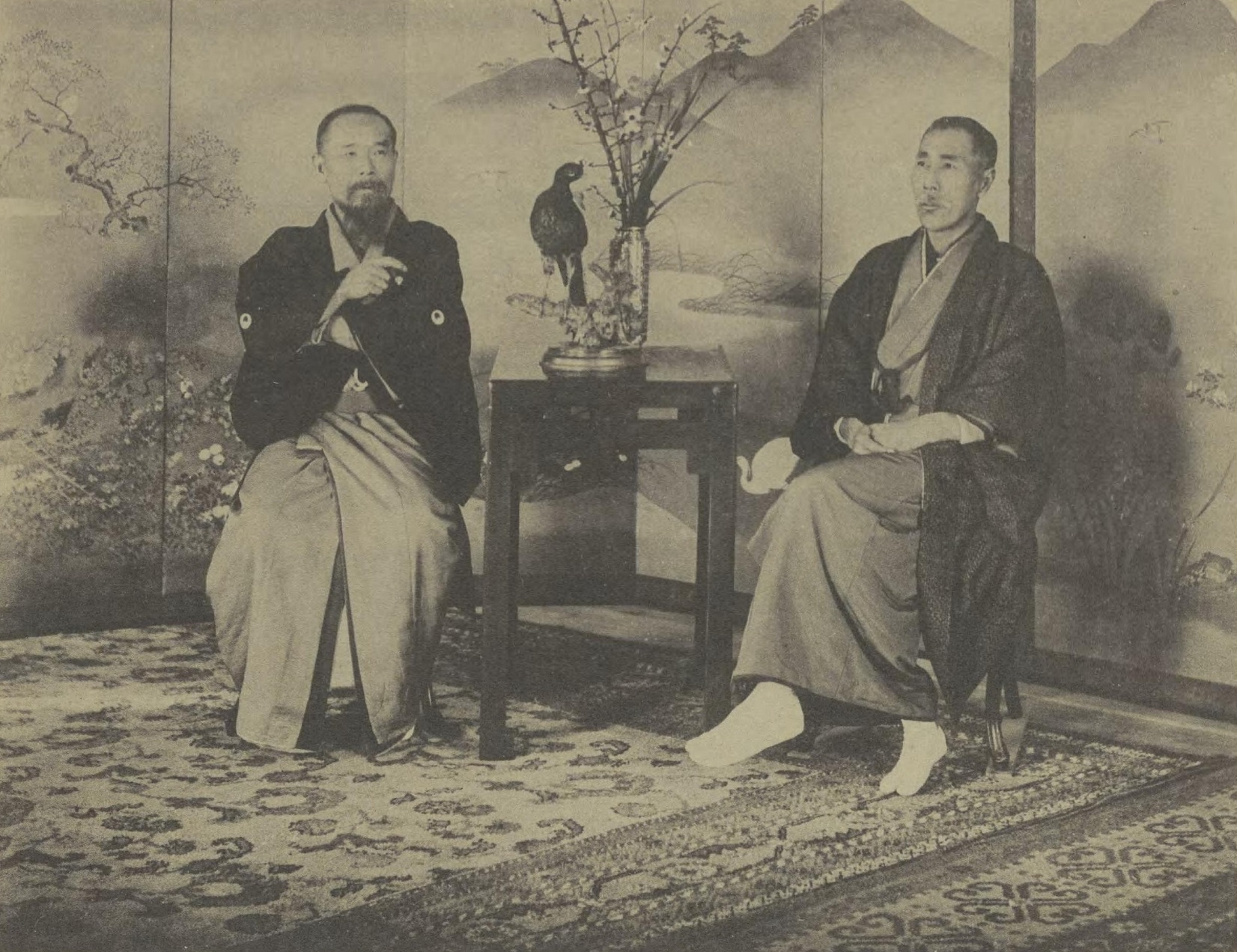
Itō (left) with Yamagata Aritomo, 1896

However, these efforts to subordinate the military to cabinet control met with strong resistance from army leaders, particularly Yamagata Aritomo. The ensuing compromise resulted in the promulgation of Military Ordinance No. 1 ("On Military Ordinances") in September 1907, which, while intended by some in government (like Home Minister Hara Takashi) to codify and thus limit iaku jōsō, effectively institutionalized the military's right of direct appeal for "supreme command-related matters". This outcome, though a partial setback for Itō's goal of full cabinet supremacy, was seen by him as a step towards clarifying the military's constitutional position, with the ongoing intent to bring military administration under greater legal and cabinet oversight, particularly during his subsequent role in Korea. The 1907 reforms, therefore, represented a complex and somewhat ambiguous development in Meiji constitutionalism, aiming to create a more integrated and powerful state but also inadvertently solidifying a degree of military independence.

== Resident-General of Korea ==
While seeking to expand his nation's claims in the Asian mainland, Itō Hirobumi sought to avoid conflict with the Russian Empire through the policy of Man-Kan kōkan, the proposed surrender of Manchuria to Russia's sphere of influence in exchange for the recognition of Japanese hegemony in Korea. However, his attempts at diplomacy failed, thereby resulting in the Russo-Japanese War (1904–1905). Itō's final major role was as the first Resident-General of Korea, a position he assumed in March 1906 following the establishment of Japan's protectorate over Korea via the Japan–Korea Treaty of 1905 in November 1905. This period of his career is among the most controversial, directly preceding Japan's full annexation of Korea in 1910.

=== Dual role and objectives ===
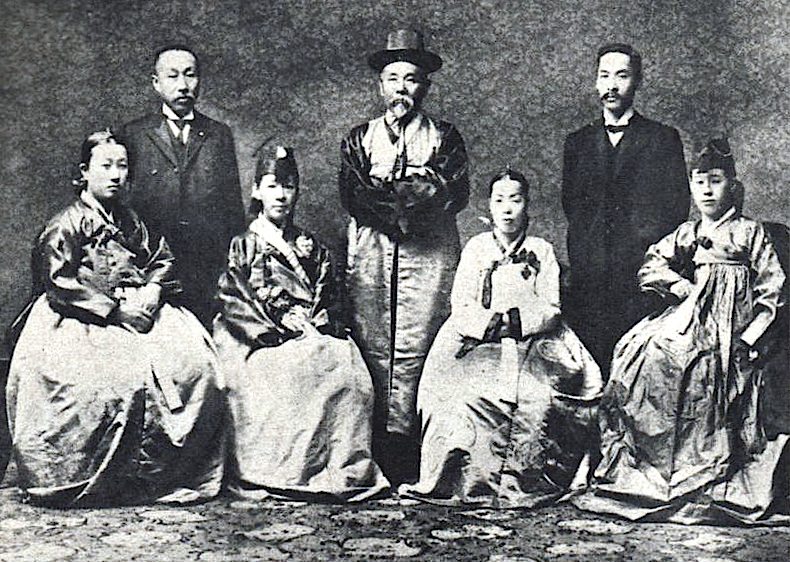
Itō (center) in Korean dress, during his tenure as Resident-General

During his tenure as Resident-General, Itō simultaneously continued his work on constitutional reforms in Japan as president of the Imperial Household Research Committee. He approached the governance of Korea with the goal of modernizing the country through gradual reforms in its political, economic, and social structures. In a 1906 statement to the Korean cabinet, he argued that Japan did not wish to "swallow up Korea", viewing the creation of an independent and reliable ally under Japanese guidance as a more cost-effective policy than direct colonial rule. He initially expressed a more optimistic view of Koreans' potential for self-government than other Japanese leaders, arguing that their backwardness was a product of a corrupt elite rather than any inherent racial characteristic. His strategy was reform through "self-rule", which required finding reliable Korean collaborators.

=== Policies and challenges ===
A central part of Itō's agenda was educational reform. He advocated for the introduction of Western-style practical science and the establishment of a modern education system, aiming to move Korea away from its traditional Confucian-centric learning, which he viewed as anachronistic and detrimental to progress. He sought to depoliticize the Korean imperial court and integrate it into a rationalized state structure, similar to his efforts with the Japanese imperial system.

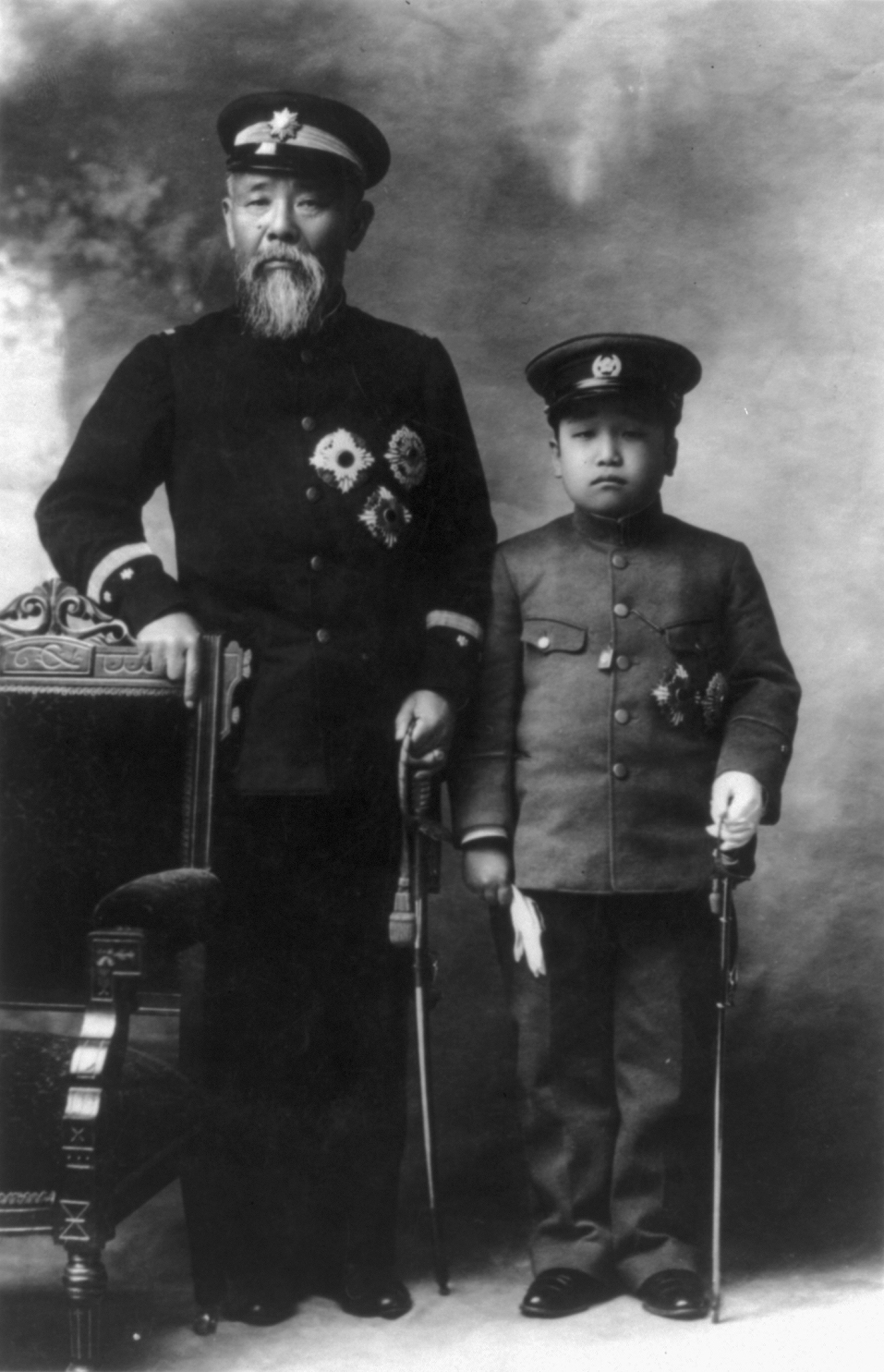
Itō with Korean Crown Prince Yi Un, 1908

However, Itō's policies faced immense challenges. His relationship with Emperor Gojong quickly deteriorated into mutual animosity, as Itō constantly reminded the emperor of his precarious hold on power while Gojong continued to resist Japanese authority through secret appeals to other foreign powers. The Hague Secret Emissary Affair in 1907, where Gojong attempted to appeal to international powers against the protectorate, was the "final straw" for Itō. On 3 July, he confronted the emperor and then urged the Korean cabinet, led by Yi Wan-yong, to secure the emperor's abdication, which occurred on 19 July. This led to the signing of the Japan–Korea Treaty of 1907, which significantly expanded the Resident-General's powers and effectively brought Korean domestic administration under Japanese control, including the installation of Japanese vice-ministers and the abolition of the Korean army.

Itō also worked to assert civilian control over the Japanese military garrison in Korea, a continuation of his efforts in Japan to subordinate the military to the cabinet. The ordinance establishing the Residency-General, which Itō himself drafted, granted him the authority to command the Japanese troops in Korea, a rare power for a civilian official. He used this authority to limit military expansion and check arbitrary actions by the army. His efforts were undermined by the growing anti-Japanese resistance. The righteous army movement escalated into a widespread guerrilla insurgency following the disbandment of the Korean army in 1907. Itō initially underestimated the strength of the popular antipathy but by early 1908 had become pessimistic. He backed the Japanese military's often brutal harsh tactics, including reprisals that affected civilians, admitting that the measures had been "too severe".

=== Shift towards annexation and resignation ===
The spread of the "righteous army" movement suggested to Itō and other officials that the policy had not secured broad support. Concluding that the policy of "nurturing self-rule" was no longer seen by him as workable, he resigned as Resident-General in June 1909. He had never ruled out annexation as an option, telling Foreign Minister Hayashi Tadasu in 1907 that it would be "good policy" to secure Russia's assent in advance. In April 1909, he gave his approval to the annexation plan proposed by Prime Minister Katsura Tarō and Foreign Minister Komura Jutarō. This shift is attributed by Takii to Japan's decision to secure Korea in exchange for ceasing its pursuit of interests in Manchuria, a compromise reached amidst international pressures, particularly concerning the Gando Convention with China. For Itō, preventing deeper military entanglement in Manchuria became a paramount concern. His final acquiescence, driven by the failure of his policies in Korea and concerns about increasing hostility and resistance in Korea.

Even as he agreed to annexation, his dictated memo outlined a post-annexation structure for Korea that included a two-house parliament with elected Korean representatives and a responsible cabinet composed of Koreans, supervised by a Japanese viceroy. This suggests that even in the context of annexation, Itō envisioned a degree of Korean autonomy and popular participation, though whether this was a realistic or achievable plan remains debatable.

== Assassination ==
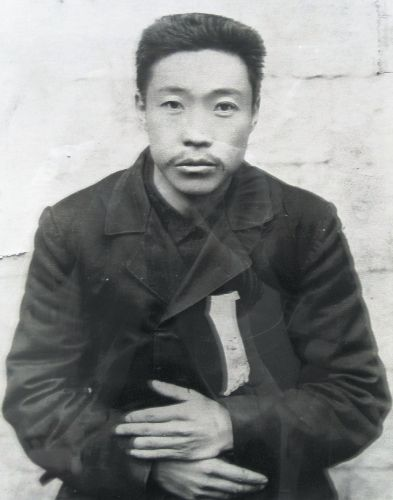
An Jung-geun, who assassinated Itō in 1909

On 26 October 1909, Itō Hirobumi was assassinated at the Harbin railway station in Manchuria. He was there to meet with Vladimir Kokovtsov, a Russian representative, to discuss regional issues, including Manchuria. As Itō stepped off the train to review the Russian guards, he was shot six times by An Jung-geun, a Korean nationalist and independence activist; three of the shots were fatal. An, who was arrested by Russian guards, cited fifteen crimes Itō had committed, including the murder of Empress Myeongseong, forcing the abdication of Emperor Gojong, and plundering Korea. An stated he had assassinated Itō as a "lieutenant general of the righteous army" because Itō, by disturbing the peace of East Asia, had estranged Japan and Korea. He hoped that relations between the two countries would become closer, as a model for the world. He also maintained that he had intentionally deceived Emperor Meiji, who desired peace in East Asia and Korean independence.

Itō's death sent shockwaves through Japan and the international community. Upon hearing the news, Emperor Meiji expressed grief. His assassination removed a powerful, albeit controversial, voice from Japanese politics and is considered by some historians to have accelerated Japan's path towards the full annexation of Korea, which occurred in August 1910.

== Personal life ==
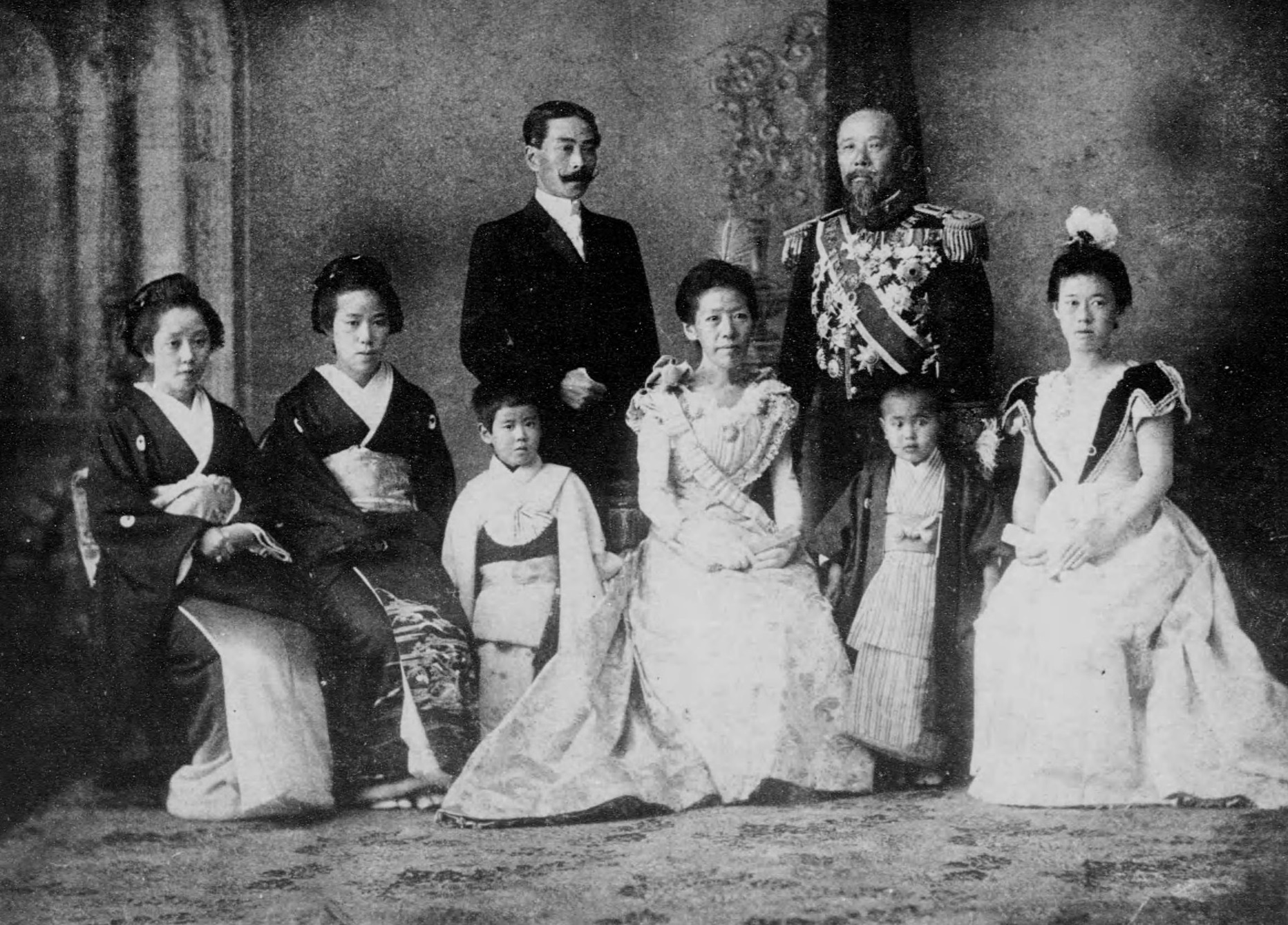
Itō with his family, 1899

Itō Hirobumi married Itō Umeko, who was the daughter of Kida Kyūbei of Jōnokoshi, Shimonoseki, in 1866. He had previously been married to Irie Sumiko from 1863, but they divorced in 1866. He had a son-in-law, Suematsu Kenchō, and an adopted son, Yūkichi (1870–1931). An emotional man, Itō was known to break down in tears when faced with difficult situations.

== Legacy ==
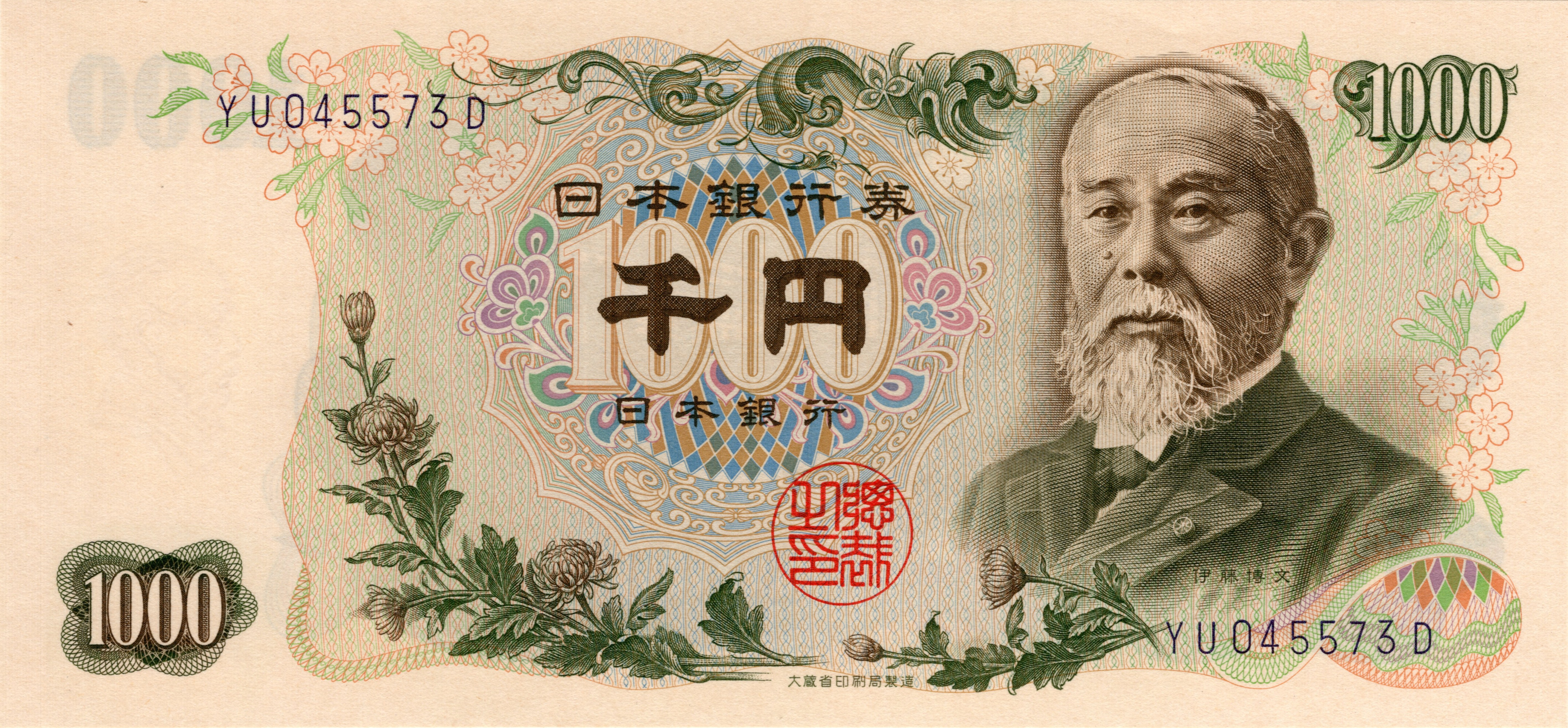
Itō appeared on the 1,000-yen banknote between 1963 and 1986.

Itō Hirobumi remains a significant and complex figure in modern Japanese history. Historians have described him as an architect of Meiji-era institutions, including the Meiji Constitution and the cabinet system. His achievements include the establishment of key institutions such as the cabinet system, the Imperial University, the Diet, and the Privy Council, all of which contributed to institutions that shaped Japan’s later governance. Affable and garrulous, in contrast to the stern and private Yamagata Aritomo, he was an able and many-sided statesman. He was a quintessential "Meiji bureaucrat as politician", contrasting with Yamagata, who was more of an "ideologue". A French editorial at the time of his death noted that while Itō was an intelligent and active statesman, his "principal work... was to be the head of state, the living symbol of the national life".

His founding of the Rikken Seiyūkai was an important development in the development of party politics in Japan. His decision in 1898 to facilitate the creation of Japan's first party cabinet, and his subsequent formation of the Rikken Seiyūkai in 1900, mark his recognition of the practical necessity of combining bureaucratic expertise with party-based political support, scholars have described the resulting party–bureaucracy relationship as influential in later Japanese politics.

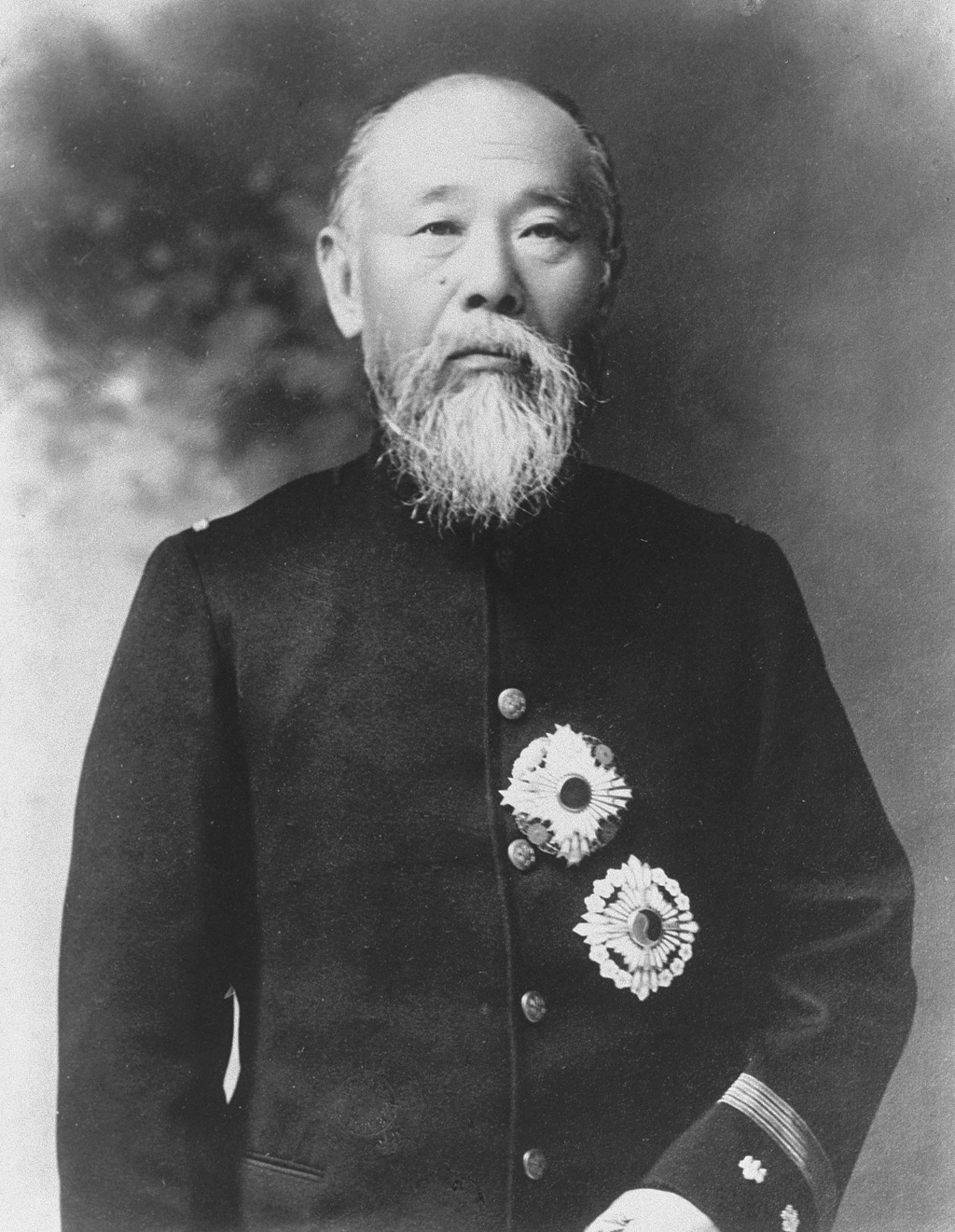
Itō c. 1908

However, his legacy is also deeply controversial, particularly due to his role as Resident-General of Korea and his part in the process that led to Korea's annexation. While some interpretations, such as that of Takii Kazuhiro, emphasize his commitment to gradualism, civilization-building, and constitutionalism, even in his approach to Korea, he is widely viewed in Korea as a symbol of Japanese imperialism. The ideology of Japanese imperialism in Korea during his time developed a distinctive cultural cast; the shared history and ethnicity with Koreans permitted the Japanese to imagine a degree of commonality not available to Western colonialists. Itō and others used rhetoric like the "family metaphor" to justify Japanese political and social subordination of Korea as a "natural" hierarchy between an "older" and "younger" brother.

Takii Kazuhiro's scholarship presents Itō not as an unprincipled opportunist, but as a "statesman of knowledge" (chi no seijika) who consistently pursued a vision of a strong, civilized, and constitutional Japanese state. This interpretation highlights Itō's lifelong emphasis on education, the acquisition of practical knowledge, and the gradual development of popular participation in government as essential components of nation-building. His efforts to integrate the imperial institution into a modern constitutional framework and to balance executive power with parliamentary mechanisms were central to his political project.

=== Historic sites ===
The house where Itō lived from age 14 in Hagi after his father was adopted by Itō Naoemon still exists, and is preserved as a museum. It is a one-story house with a thatched roof and a gabled roof, with a total floor area of 29 tsubo and is located 150 meters south of the Shōkasonjuku Academy. The adjacent villa is a portion of a house built by Itō in 1907 in Oimura, Shimoebara-gun, Tokyo (currently Shinagawa, Tokyo). It was a large Western-style mansion, of which three structures, a part of the entrance, a large hall, and a detached room, were transported Hagi. The large hall has a mirrored ceiling and its wooden paneling uses 1000-year old cedar trees from Yoshino. The buildings were collectively designated a National Historic Site in 1932.

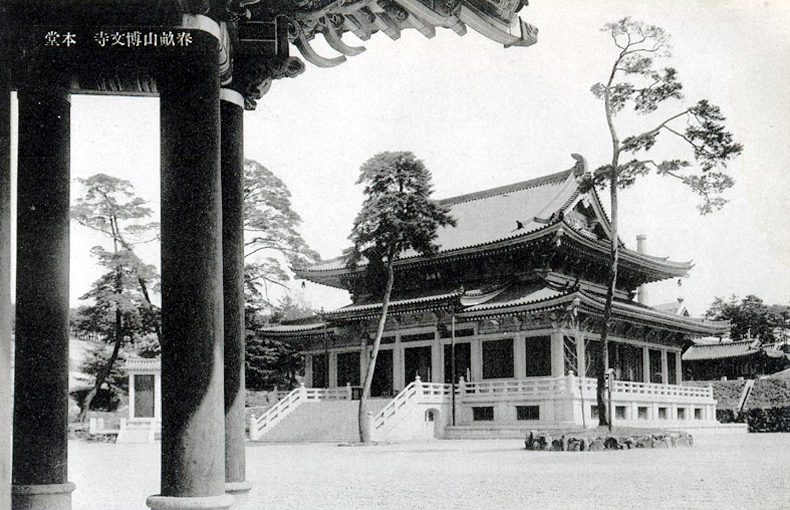
Former Hakubun-ji Buddhist Temple in Seoul

In 1932, the Japanese unveiled the Hakubun-ji Buddhist Temple (博文寺) in Seoul, dedicated to Itō as the "Prince Itō Memorial Temple (伊藤公爵祈念寺院)". Situated in then Susumu Tadashidan Park on the north slope of Namsan, which after liberation became Jangchungdan Park 장충단 공원. From October 1945, the main hall served as student home, ca. 1960 replaced by a guest house of the Park Chung-Hee administration, then reconstructed and again a student guest house. In 1979 it was incorporated into the grounds of the Shilla Hotel then opened. Several other parts of the temple are still at the site.

== Honours ==
=== Japanese ===
==== Peerages and other titles ====
- Count (7 July 1884)
- Genrō (1 November 1889)
- Marquess (5 August 1895)
- Prince (21 September 1907)

==== Decorations ====
- Grand Cordon of the Order of the Rising Sun (2 November 1877)
- Grand Cordon of the Order of the Rising Sun with Paulownia Flowers (11 February 1889)
- Imperial Constitution Promulgation Medal (25 November 1889)
- Medal of Honor with Yellow ribbon (20 June 1890)
- Grand Cordon of the Order of the Chrysanthemum (5 August 1895)
- First Sino-Japanese War Medal (18 November 1895)
- Collar of the Order of the Chrysanthemum (1 April 1906)
- Russo-Japanese War Medal (1 April 1906)
- Crown Prince's Voyage to Korea Commemorative Medal (18 April 1909)

==== Court ranks ====
- Fifth rank, junior grade (1868)
- Fifth rank (1869)
- Fourth rank (1870)
- Senior fourth rank (18 February 1874)
- Third rank (27 December 1884)
- Second rank (19 October 1886)
- Senior second rank (20 December 1895)
- Junior First Rank (26 October 1909; posthumous)

=== Foreign ===
- German Empire:
  - Knight 1st Class of the Order of the Crown (29 December 1884)
  - Grand Cross of the Order of the Red Eagle (22 December 1886); in Brilliants (December 1901)
  - Saxe-Weimar-Eisenach: Grand Cross of the Order of the White Falcon (29 September 1882)
- Russian Empire:
  - Knight of the Order of the White Eagle (17 September 1883)
  - Knight of the Order of St. Alexander Nevsky (19 March 1896); in Brilliants (28 November 1901)
- Sweden-Norway: Commander Grand Cross of the Order of Vasa (25 May 1885)
- Austria-Hungary: Knight 1st Class of the Order of the Iron Crown (27 September 1885)
- Kingdom of Portugal: Grand Cross of the Order of the Immaculate Conception of Vila Viçosa (25 August 1887)
- Siam: Grand Cross of the Order of the Crown of Siam (24 January 1888)
- Spain: Grand Cross of the Order of Charles III (26 October 1896)
- Belgium: Grand Cordon of the Royal Order of Leopold (4 October 1897)
- France: Grand Cross of the Legion of Honour (29 April 1898)
- Qing dynasty: Order of the Double Dragon, Class I Grade III (5 December 1898)
- United Kingdom: Honorary Grand Cross of the Order of the Bath (civil division) (14 January 1902)
- Kingdom of Italy: Knight of the Supreme Order of the Most Holy Annunciation (16 January 1902)
- Korean Empire: Grand Cordon of the Order of the Golden Ruler (18 April 1904)

== See also ==
- Japanese students in Britain
- Satsuma Rebellion

Political offices
Preceded by Ōkubo Toshimichi	Lord of Home Affairs; 1874	Succeeded by Ōkubo Toshimichi
Preceded by Ōkubo Toshimichi	Lord of Home Affairs; 1878–1880	Succeeded by Matsukata Masayoshi
New office	Prime Minister of Japan; 1885–1888	Succeeded by Kuroda Kiyotaka
Preceded by Inoue Kaoru	Minister for Foreign Affairs (Japan); 1887–1888	Succeeded by Ōkuma Shigenobu
New office	President of the Privy Council; 1888–1889	Succeeded by Oki Takato
New office	President of the House of Peers; 1890–1891	Succeeded by Hachisuka Mochiaki
Preceded by Oki Takato	President of the Privy Council; 1891–1892	Succeeded by Oki Takato
Preceded by Matsukata Masayoshi	Prime Minister of Japan; 1892–1896	Succeeded by Kuroda Kiyotaka as Acting Prime Minister
Preceded by Matsukata Masayoshi	Prime Minister of Japan; 1898	Succeeded by Ōkuma Shigenobu
Preceded by Yamagata Aritomo	Prime Minister of Japan; 1900–1901	Succeeded by Saionji Kinmochi as Acting Prime Minister
Preceded by Saionji Kinmochi	President of the Privy Council; 1903–1905	Succeeded by Yamagata Aritomo
New office	Resident General of Korea; 1905–1909	Succeeded by Sone Arasuke
Preceded by Yamagata Aritomo	President of the Privy Council; 1909	Succeeded by Yamagata Aritomo
