= Motoda Nagazane =

Japanese statesman (1818–91)

Junior Second Rank Motoda Nagazane
- 元田 永孚
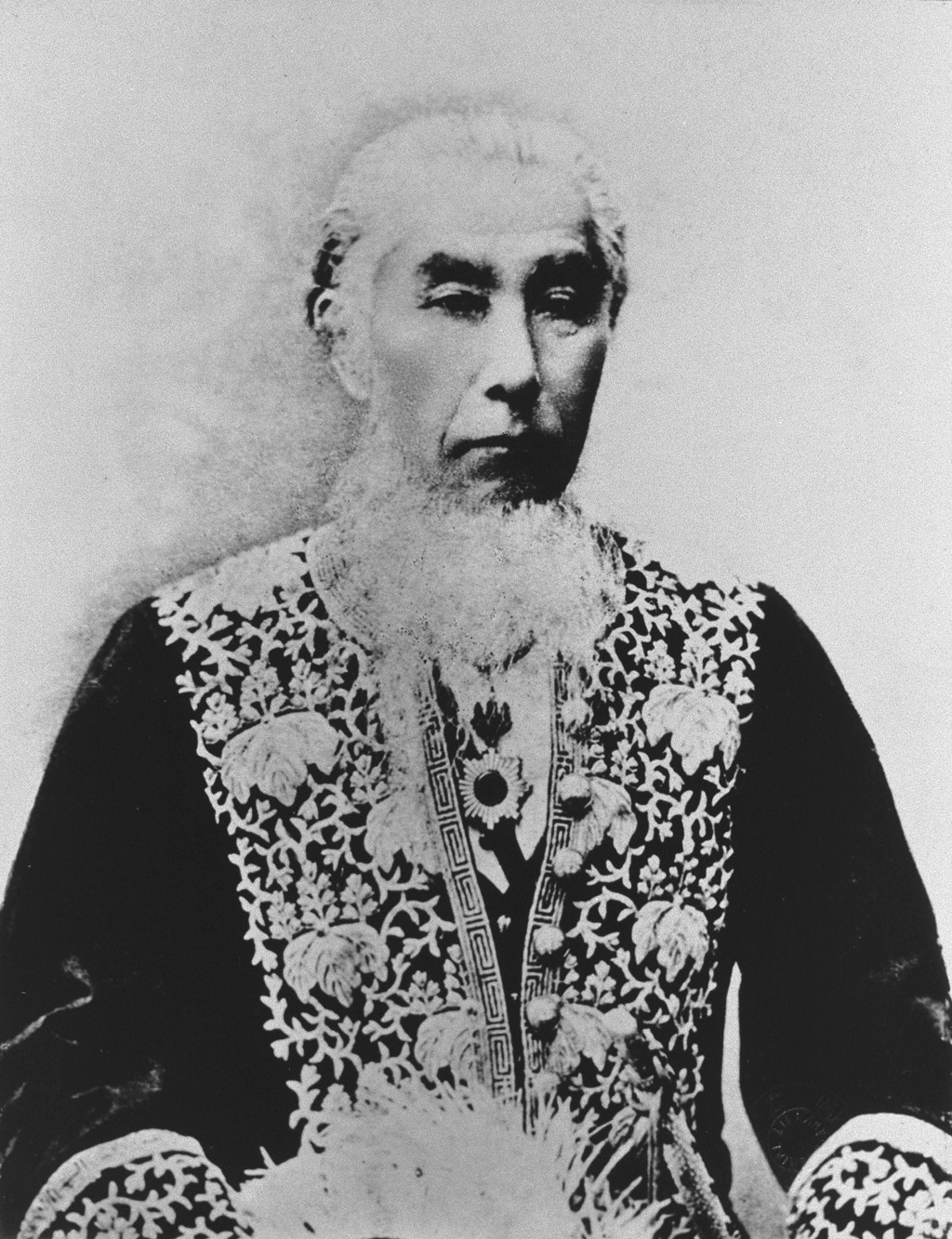

Personal details
- Born: October 30, 1818 Higo Province, Japan
- Died: December 22, 1891 (aged 73) Empire of Japan
- Occupation: Samurai, Confucian scholar
- Known for: Drafting the Imperial Rescript on Education

Motoda Nagazane (元田 永孚) (30 October 1818 – December 22, 1891) was a Japanese samurai and Confucian scholar. He was also known as "Eiji" and his childhood name was "Daikichi".

== Early life ==
Motoda was born in 1818 in Higo Province as the eldest son of a retainer to the Kumamoto Domain. He first took up study at Jishūkan, where he focussed on practical sciences and was influenced by men such as Yoshiyama Sariyō and Yokoi Shōnan, and was good friends with the latter. He was also introduced to the jitsugaku school of neo-Confucianism. His father disapproved though, as it was frowned upon by the domain's current daimyo

== Meiji period ==
Motoda became the tutor for the former Kumamoto daimyo, known at that time as governor after the abolition of the han system. On the recommendation of men such as Ōkubo Toshimichi, Motoda was appointed as tutor to Emperor Meiji. He also played a part in drafting the Imperial Rescript on Education.

== Views on education ==
Motoda had very conservative views when it came to education, as shown in the Imperial Rescript on Education. He also insisted that, while Western knowledge was superior, East Asian ethics was far superior to that found in the West.

== Illness and death ==
In 1891, there was an epidemic of influenza. Even Motoda wasn't safe from this, and, after a short illness, died on December 22, 1891, aged 73. It is also said that the emperor wept after hearing of Motoda's death. He was posthumously raised to the Junior Second Rank and named as Danshaku (Baron).
