= Shotouka-Chiri =

Japanese elementary geography textbook

Shotouka-Chiri (Shotōka Chiri, 初等科地理) is a geography book for elementary schools that was published in Japan in 1943. It was the official geography text for obligatory use in the Kokumin Gakkou, or National School. It complemented the Japanese history present in Shinmin no Michi and Kokutai no Hongi official texts amongst the Imperial Rescripts on Education.

== Introduction ==
This text book was divided in two parts: Chapter I "the Geography of Japan" and Chapter II "the Geography of the World".

The content of the first chapter of part 1 the Japanese island are explained in relation with to the Asia-Pacific Region specially the Greater East Asia Region. The physical environments of Japan was explained in detail in Chapter 2. The geography of each region in Japan is presented from chapter three onwards and Karafuto, Chosen, Formosa, Kantoshu in China, in addition to the Japan mainland. These were part of Japan at that time. The contents of each chapter from chapter two onwards are chronological, mainly relating to products from each region.

== Contents of Shotouka-Chiri text ==
- Part I 1 Map of Japanese Empire
- 2-Honshū, Kyushu and Shikoku
- 3-Kanto Plains, in which the capital of Empire situated
- 4-From Tokyo to Kobe
- 5-From Kobe to Shimonoseki
- 6-Kyushu and small island surrounded
- Part II 1 Greater East Asia Map
- 2-Syonan (Singapore) and Malay peninsula
- 3-The Islands of East India (Andaman and Nicobar)
- 4-The Philippines Archipielago
- 5-Manshokoku (Manchukuo)
- 6-Moukyo (Mengchiang) the northeast part of China

== Patriotic and nationalist ideas in the text ==
Description in chapter one is as follows:

"The shape with which each of the islands, the Chisima-To in the north, the Main island Honshu in the center, and the Ryu-Kyu islands in the south, protrude into the Pacific Ocean like a bow, makes all of Japan's islands tighten much better. We can feel something of the strong powers from this shape. The shape of the Japan islands is not ordinary. We can imagine the shape of going forward to the Pacific Ocean bravely standing in front of the Asian continent. The Japan islands also may be considered as playing the role of defending the continent from the Pacific Ocean. In this way, we feel that God truly created our country, Japan, which is blessed with matchless territory in this location and its shapes".

And the last paragraph in the chapter described this:

"The high population density and high increasing rate of population in Japan is quite rare in the world. This indicate the plenitude of State Power and makes us feel reassured."

In the second chapter is presented a world view centred on Asia. Its contents are restricted to Asia and Oceania.

The Dai-Toa region is presented, and then each region is described in turn: Singapore, the Malay Peninsula, the Philippines, Manchuria, Mengchiang, etc.

In the final Chapter III, the book states the following:

"It is our country, Nihon, from which the sun rises up, that is located in the center of Dai-Toa (Greater East Asia), which includes the Pacific Ocean region and its islands from the Asian Continent to the Indian Ocean. According with the Emperor's will, a hundred million of our brethren who are born in Japan should accomplish the great task of building the Dai-Toa region, in which we should not be a disappointment to our ancestors. We should give and share with all people the pleasure of eternal world peace and Co-Prosperity to all countries in the world."

== See also ==
- Imperial Rescript on Education
- Kokutai
- Shinmin no Michi
- Education in the Empire of Japan
