= Shinmin no Michi =

WW2-era ideological manifesto issued by the Japanese Ministry of Education

Shinmin no michi, 1941

The Shinmin no michi (臣民の道, "Way of Subjects") was an ideological manifesto issued by the Ministry of Education of Japan during World War II aimed at Japan's domestic audience to explain in clear terms what was expected of them "as a people, nation and race".

== Origins ==
During the summer of 1941, Prime Minister Fumimaro Konoe ordered the Minister of Education of Japan to compose a "Bible of the Japanese People", under the title of Shinmin no michi, which was also sometimes called Hito-do (Subject's Way), or Shinja-do (The Way of the Follower). The first edition of 30,000 was issued in August 1941 and distributed to all schools in Japan.

The Shinmin no michi offered three chapters which required only a few minutes of reading, explaining how subjects of the Emperor were to behave. It also presented a brief overview of world history from the Japanese viewpoint in the first third of the first chapter.

== Themes ==
One of the main theme of the book dwelled on the direct descent of Emperor Shōwa from the goddess Amaterasu and the religious characterization of the Kokutai which was identified as a "theocracy" in which "The way of subjects of the Emperor issues from polity of the Emperor, and is to guard and maintain the Imperial Throne coexistent with the Heavens and the Earth." Emperor Shōwa and his war (seisen) were described as "holy". The virtues he embodied were unique and immutable.

"The Imperial Family is the fountain source of Japanese nation, and national and private life issue from this. The way of the subject is to be loyal to the Emperor in disregard of self, thereby supporting the Imperial Throne coexistensive with the Heavens and the Earth."

Filial piety and loyalty were the supreme virtues of the subjects of the imperial state and the book denounced the "individualism", liberalism, utilitarianism and materialism that imperiled those virtues.

"the country was contaminated by perverted thinking and our sacred duty is to clean this and to return to the virtuous customs of our ancestors. It is by working with harmony and cooperation and making manifest our national dignity that the Heavenly Spirits of our Ancestors should be obeyed in a dutiful manner, which, by working in harmony with others, is for the greater glory of the Throne".

The Shinmin no michi also argued that the Allied powers had bent on world domination for centuries, and had been quite successful as evidenced by the fact that only a few thousand Europeans now ruled over 450 million Asians. The western values system, based on greed and self-indulgence, was seen as to blame for countless bloody wars of aggression, and for the current world economic crisis. America was singled out for special criticism, with mention made of black slavery and the mistreatment of minorities and immigrants.

"the entry of Western countries in all parts of whole world, including the Far East, has given them international domination, and also led them to believe that they themselves possess the right to commit injurious acts against others".

Regarding the "holy" war in China:

"Viewed from the standpoint of world history, the China Affair is a step toward the construction of a world of moral principles by Japan. The building up of a new order for securing lasting peace of the world will be attained by the disposal of the China Affair as a stepping stone." (...) The China Affair is a bold task for Japan to propagate the ideals of the Empire founding throughout East Asia and the world over (...) Japan is the fountain source of the Yamato race, Manchukuo its reservoir, and East Asia is its paddy field."

The United States and Great Britain were accused in the Shinmin no michi of impeding the establishment of a state of general peace between Japan and China.

The other sections refer to correct social and moral customs, some racial and eugenic ideas, theology and religion, martial doctrines and other aspects of local customs.

== Way of the Family ==
The Shinmin no michi (Way of Subjects) was supplemented in 1942 by the Ie no michi (家の道 or formally, 家の道：文部省戦時家庭教育指導要項解説 Ie no michi: Monbushō senji katei kyōiku shidō yōkō kaisetsu), which elaborated on sections of the Kokutai no hongi (国体の本義 "Cardinal Principles of the National Entity") pertaining to traditional hierarchical familial relationships. Family harmony is maintained by having each member fulfill his/her proper function in the family structure, and likewise this principle applies also to the community as a whole, as well as to the State.

== See also ==
- Imperial Rescript on Education
- Minzoku
- Shotouka-Chiri
- An Investigation of Global Policy with the Yamato Race as Nucleus
