= Hitokiri (film) =

- Film poster
- Directed by: Hideo Gosha
- Written by: Shinobu Hashimoto
- Produced by: Shichiro Murakami; Takashi Norimoto
- Starring: Shintaro Katsu; Tatsuya Nakadai; Yukio Mishima; Yujiro Ishihara
- Cinematography: Fujio Morita
- Edited by: Kanji Suganuma
- Music by: Masaru Sato
- Production companies: Fuji Telecasting; Katsu Productions
- Distributed by: Daiei Film (Japan); Japanese Film Exchange (USA); Daiei International Films (USA)
- Release date: 9 August 1969 (Japan)
- Running time: 140 minutes
- Country: Japan
- Language: Japanese

Hitokiri (Japanese: 人斬り) (released as Tenchu! in the United States) is a 1969 Japanese samurai film directed by Hideo Gosha set during the end of the Tokugawa shogunate and based on the lives of the historical Four Hitokiri of the Bakumatsu. It is notable for starring the famous author Yukio Mishima.

== Plot ==
Okada Izō is a rōnin born into poverty who joins the Tosa Kinnō-tō, a group of Imperial loyalists based in Tosa and headed by Takechi Hanpeita. Izō soon becomes a well known and successful killer, and he is stubbornly loyal to Hanpeita. However, Sakamoto Ryōma warns him that he is merely "Takechi's dog" and that Hanpeita will end up betraying him. After Izō fouls a night attack by the Kinnō-Tō on Ishibe Station by revealing his identity, Hanpeita's wrath at his blunder and resentment at his own subordinacy begins to test Izō's loyalty. Eventually abandoning Hanpeita, the regretful Izō returns and apologizes. He is then ordered to assassinate the aristocrat Anegakōji Kintomo outside the Sarugatsuji using the sword of Tanaka Shinbei. During his interrogation over Anegakōji's death, Tanaka commits harakiri after his recovered sword is presented to him as evidence. As Hanpeita becomes increasingly determined to succeed in his plan to become daimyo of Tosa by eliminating his opponents, it becomes necessary to sacrifice Izō, which he does by betraying him after he is arrested as a rōnin by the Aizu Mimawarigumi and later by trying to poison him with amygdalin-drugged sake (座枯らし). Izō survives, but, disillusioned, confesses to his murders for the Kinnō-Tō, and is condemned to crucifixion. Before being killed, he is told that Hanpeita will be forced to commit harakiri.

== Cast ==
- Shintaro Katsu as Okada Izō
- Tatsuya Nakadai as Takechi Hanpeita
- Yujiro Ishihara as Sakamoto Ryōma
- Yukio Mishima as Tanaka Shinbei
- Mitsuko Baisho as Omino
- Ichirō Nakatani
- Kunie Tanaka
- Noboru Nakaya as Anegakōji Kintomo
- Tsutomu Shimomoto as Matsuda
- Yūsuke Takita as Hiramastu
- Takumi Shinjo as Minakawa

== Production ==
- Yoshinobu Nishioka - Art direction
