= Ryōmaden =

- Written by: Yasushi Fukuda
- Directed by: Keishi Ōtomo
- Starring: Masaharu Fukuyama; Teruyuki Kagawa; Nao Ōmori; Yūsuke Iseya; Yōko Maki; Ryōko Hirosue; Shinobu Terajima; Yū Aoi; Shihori Kanjiya; Takeru Satoh; Munetaka Aoki; Yo Oizumi; Shōsuke Tanihara; Jun Kaname; Tamiyo Kusakari; Tetta Sugimoto; Ikkei Watanabe; Hirotarō Honda; Ryo Ishibashi; Chieko Matsubara; Keizō Kanie; Katsumi Takahashi; Kimiko Yo; Takaya Kamikawa; Tetsuya Takeda; Masaomi Kondō; Mitsuko Baisho; Isao Natsuyagi; Kiyoshi Kodama; Kōtarō Satomi
- Narrated by: Teruyuki Kagawa
- Theme music composer: Junichi Hirokami
- Opening theme: Lisa Gerrard and NHK Symphony Orchestra
- Composer: Naoki Satō
- Country of origin: Japan
- Original language: Japanese
- No. of episodes: 48

Production
- Executive producers: Kei Suzuki; Kanako Iwatani
- Running time: 46 x 45 minutes 2 x 75 minutes

Original release
- Network: NHK
- Release: January 3 – November 28, 2010

Ryōmaden (龍馬伝) is the 49th NHK Taiga drama. It was shown on NHK from January 3 to November 28, 2010, spanning 48 episodes. The story centers on the life of 19th-century Japanese historical figures Iwasaki Yatarō and Sakamoto Ryōma. It has been announced that the series will be aired in several other countries, for example Hong Kong, South Korea, Taiwan and Thailand.

== Production ==
Production Credits

- Original – Yasushi Fukuda
- Music – Naoki Satō
- Titling – Shishū
- Narrator – Teruyuki Kagawa
- Historical research – Manabu Ōishi, Tatsuya Yamamura
- Architectural research – Sei Hirai
- Clothing research – Kiyoko Koizumi
- Beauty and costume direction – Isao Tsuge
- Sword fight arranger - Kunishirō Hayashi
- Production coordinator – Kei Suzuki, Kanako Iwatani
- Casting – Keishi Ōtomo

== Cast ==
- Masaharu Fukuyama as Sakamoto Ryōma (坂本龍馬)
  - Tatsuomi Hamada as young Ryōma

Sakamoto family

- Shinobu Terajima as Sakamoto Otome (坂本乙女) – older sister of Ryōma - later Okaue Otome (岡上乙女)
  - Tao Tsuchiya as young Otome
- Kiyoshi Kodama as Sakamoto Hachihei (坂本八平) – father of Ryōma
- Tetta Sugimoto as Sakamoto Gonpei (坂本権平) – oldest brother of Ryōma
- Wakako Shimazaki as Sakamoto Chino (坂本千野) – Gonpei's wife
- Atsuko Maeda as Sakamoto Harui (坂本春猪) – Gonpei's daughter
  - Tamaki Matsumoto as young Harui
- Rei Ōtori as Sakamoto Chizu (坂本千鶴) – oldest sister of Ryōma – later Takamatsu Chizu (高松千鶴)
- Chieko Matsubara as Sakamoto Iyo (坂本伊與) – stepmother of Ryōma
- Tamiyo Kusakari as Sakamoto Kō (坂本幸) – mother of Ryōma
- Yōko Maki as Narasaki Ryō (a.k.a. Oryō) (楢崎龍) – Ryōma's wife

Iwasaki family

- Teruyuki Kagawa as Iwasaki Yatarō (岩崎弥太郎) – the founder of Mitsubishi, born in Tosa
- Keizō Kanie as Iwasaki Yajirō (岩崎弥次郎) – Yatarō's father
- Mitsuko Baisho as Iwasaki Miwa (岩崎美和) – Yatarō's mother
- Maiko as Iwasaki Kise (岩崎喜勢) – Yatarō's wife

Tosa clan

- Masaomi Kondō as Yamauchi Yōdō (山内容堂) - the 15th head of the Tosa Domain
- Munetaka Aoki as Gotō Shōjirō (後藤象二郎) – nephew of Yoshida Tōyō
- Min Tanaka as Yoshida Tōyō (吉田東洋)
- Nao Ōmori as Takechi Hanpeita (武市半平太) – leader of the Tosa Kinnō-tō
- Ryōko Hirosue as Hirai Kao (平井加尾) – first crush of Ryōma
- Hiroyuki Miyasako as Hirai Shūjirō (平井収二郎) – older brother of Kao
- Takeru Satoh as Okada Izō (岡田以蔵) – assassin of the Bakumatsu period
- Takaya Kamikawa as Nakaoka Shintarō (中岡慎太郎) – brethren of Ryōma, born in Tosa Domain
- Pierre Taki as Mizobuchi Hironojō (溝渕広之丞)

Chōshū clan

- Katsuhisa Namase as Yoshida Shōin (吉田松陰) – master of Katsura Kogorō
- Shōsuke Tanihara as Katsura Kogorō (桂小五郎) – disciple of Yoshida Shōin
- Yūsuke Iseya as Takasugi Shinsaku (高杉晋作)
- Toshio Kakei as Miyoshi Shinzō (三吉慎蔵)
- Kyōsuke Yabe as Kusaka Genzui (久坂玄瑞)
- Hiroyuki Onoue as Itō Shunsuke (伊藤俊輔)

Satsuma clan

- Katsumi Takahashi as Saigō Kichinosuke (西郷吉之助)
- Mitsuhiro Oikawa as Ōkubo Toshimichi (大久保利通)
- Kenichi Takitō as Komatsu Tatewaki (小松帯刀)

Chiba Dojo

- Shihori Kanjiya as Chiba Sana (千葉佐那) – daughter of Chiba Sadakichi
- Kōtarō Satomi as Chiba Sadakichi (千葉定吉) – management of sword school Chiba Dōjō
- Ikkei Watanabe as Chiba Jūtarō (千葉重太郎) – older brother of Chiba Sanako

Tokugawa Bakufu

- Tetsushi Tanaka as Tokugawa Yoshinobu (徳川慶喜) – the 15th and last shōgun of the Tokugawa shogunate
- Nakamura Hayato as Tokugawa Iemochi (徳川家茂) – the 14th shōgun of the Tokugawa shogunate
- Tetsuya Takeda as Katsu Rintarō (勝麟太郎) – a Japanese naval officer and statesman
- Tortoise Matsumoto as John Manjirō (ジョン万次郎) – one of the first Japanese people to visit the United States
- Tomoharu Hasegawa as Matsudaira Katamori

Shinsengumi

- Taizō Harada as Kondō Isami (近藤勇) – the commander of the Shinsengumi
- Satoshi Matsuda as Hijikata Toshizō (土方歳三) – the vice-commander of Shinsengumi
- Rakuto Tochihara as Okita Sōji (沖田総司) – the captain of the first unit of the Shinsengumi

Kyoto Mimawarigumi

- Ichikawa Kamejirō II as Imai Nobuo (今井信郎)
- Tatsuya Nakamura as Sasaki Tadasaburō (佐々木只三郎)
- SION as Watanabe Atsushi (渡辺篤)

Kaientai

- Yō Ōizumi as Kondō Chōjirō (近藤長次郎) – son of a bun store owner in Kōchi
- Jun Kaname as Sawamura Sōnojō (沢村惣之丞)
- Yūta Hiraoka as Mutsu Munemitsu (陸奥陽之助) – a statesman and diplomat in Meiji period, born in Wakayama domain
- Kenta Kiritani as Ike Kurata (池内蔵太)
- Daijirō Kawaoka as Takamatsu Tarō (高松太郎) – Ryōma's adopted child
- Atsushi Korechika as Chiya Toranosuke (千屋寅之助)

People in Nagasaki

- Yū Aoi as Moto (元) – geisha girl of restaurant in Maruyama
- Hirotarō Honda as Kozone Kendō (小曽根乾堂) – business tycoon in Nagasaki
- Kimiko Yo as Ōura Kei (大浦慶) – business tycoon
- Terry Itō as Ueno Hikoma (上野彦馬) – photographer

Foreigners

- Timothy Harris as Matthew C. Perry – the Commodore of the U.S. Navy
- Randy Buinz as Townsend Harris – a successful New York City merchant and minor politician
- Tim Wellard as Thomas Blake Glover – trading merchant in Nagasaki, born in Scotland
- Jeffrey Rowe as William Alt
- Patrick Harlan as Ernest Satow
- Daniel Foley as Rutherford Alcock
- Péter Frankl as Léon Roches
- Dennis Zomerhuis as Anton L. C. Portman

== Season overview ==
The box set is available in a general DVD version, and a Blu-ray Disc version.

Season	Episode	DVD release dates	Discs
Season 1	1-13	September 22, 2010	4
Season 2	13-28	November 26, 2010	4
Season 3	29-38	January 28, 2011	3
Season 4	39-48	March 25, 2011	3
Highlight	1-48	April 22, 2011	3

The 1st episode and last episodes are 75 minutes long. The others are 45 minutes long, excepting commercials.

SEASON 1 RYOMA THE DREAMER
Episode	Title	Directed by	Travelogue	Original airdate	Rating
1	"Jōshi to kashi" (上士と下士, Samurai Social Hierarchy)	Keishi Ōtomo	Kōchi, Kōchi about Sakamoto Ryōma	January 3, 2010	23.2%
2	"Taikibansei?" (大器晩成?, Late Bloomer?)	Keishi Ōtomo	Kōchi, Kōchi about Sakamoto Ryōma	January 10, 2010	21.0%
3	"Nisetegata no tabi" (偽手形の旅, The Travel of Fake Bill)	Hitoshi Manabe	Aki, Kōchi about Iwasaki Yataro	January 17, 2010	22.6%
4	"Edo no onikomachi" (江戸の鬼小町, A Demon Girl in Edo)	Keishi Ōtomo	Chiyoda, Tokyo about Sakamoto Ryōma	January 24, 2010	23.4%
5	"Kurofune to ken" (黒船と剣, Black Ship and Sword)	Hitoshi Manabe	Shinagawa, Tokyo about Sakamoto Ryōma	January 31, 2010	24.4%
6	"Shōin wa dokoda?" (松陰はどこだ?, Where is Shōin?)	Hitoshi Manabe	Shimoda, Shizuoka about Yoshida Shōin	February 7, 2010	21.2%
7	"Haruka naru nūyōka" (遥かなるヌーヨーカ, Distant Newyork)	Kazuki Watanabe	Kōchi, Kōchi about Kawada Shōryō	February 14, 2010	20.2%
8	"Yatarō no namida" (弥太郎の涙, Tears of Yatarō)	Kazuki Watanabe	Aki, Kōchi about Iwasaki Yataro	February 21, 2010	22.3%
9	"Inochi no nedan" (命の値段, A Price of Human Life)	Keishi Ōtomo	Chiyoda, Tokyo about Yamamoto Takuma	February 28, 2010	21.0%
10	"Hikisakareta ai" (引きさかれた愛, The Broken Love)	Hitoshi Manabe	Kōchi, Kōchi about Hirai Kaho	March 7, 2010	20.4%
11	"Tosa futtō" (土佐沸騰, The Passion in Tosa)	Kazuki Watanabe	Kōchi, Kōchi about Yoshida Tōyō	March 14, 2010	21.4%
12	"Ansatsu shirei" (暗殺指令, Mission To Kill)	Kazuki Watanabe	Hagi, Yamaguchi about Kusaka Gensui	March 21, 2010	17.7%
13	"Saraba Tosa yo" (さらば土佐よ, Farewell, Tosa)	Keishi Ōtomo	Kōchi, Kōchi about Sakamoto Ryōma	March 28, 2010	18.8%
SEASON 2 RYOMA THE ADVENTURER
Episode	Title	Directed by	Travelogue	Original airdate	Rating
14	"Otazunemono Ryōma" (お尋ね者龍馬, The Outlaw)	Kazuki Watanabe	Kōchi, Kōchi about Takechi Hanpeita	April 4, 2010	18.5%
15	"Futari no kyō" (ふたりの京, Kyōto for Only Two People)	Keishi Ōtomo	Kyoto about Takechi Hanpeita	April 11, 2010	18.4%
16	"Katsu Rintarō" (勝麟太郎, Katsu Rintarō)	Keishi Ōtomo	Sumida, Tokyo about Katsu Rintarō	April 18, 2010	21.9%
17	"Kaibutsu, Yōdō" (怪物、容堂, The Monster, Yōdō)	Tōjō Kajiwara	Tosashimizu, Kōchi about John Manjirō	April 25, 2010	21.8%
18	"Kaigun o tsukurō" (海軍を作ろう!, Let's establish Our Navy)	Kazuki Watanabe	Osaka about Sakamoto Ryōma	May 2, 2010	18.4%
19	"Jōi kekkō" (攘夷決行, Going on, Jōi)	Tōjō Kajiwara	Shimonoseki, Yamaguchi about Battles for Shimonoseki	May 9, 2010	19.0%
20	"Shūjirō, Munen" (収二郎、無念, The Last Moment of Shūjirō)	Keishi Ōtomo	Fukui, Fukui about Matsudaira Shungaku	May 16, 2010	20.4%
21	"Kokyō no tomoyo" (故郷の友よ, The Brethren of Old Home)	Kazuki Watanabe	Kōchi, Kōchi about Yamanouchi Yōdō	May 23, 2010	20.0%
22	"Ryō toiu onna" (龍という女, A Woman called Ryō)	Keishi Ōtomo	Kyoto about Oryō	May 30, 2010	19.5%
23	"Ikedaya ni hashire" (池田屋に走れ, Hurry up to the Ikedaya)	Hitoshi Manabe	Kobe about Katsu Kaishū	June 6, 2010	19.2%
24	"Ai no hotaru" (愛の蛍, The Sentimental Fireflies)	Tōjō Kajiwara	Kyoto about Shinsengumi	June 13, 2010	20.1%
25	"Teradaya no haha" (寺田屋の母, The Mother at Teradaya)	Kazuki Watanabe	Kyoto around the Kinmon Incident	June 20, 2010	20.3%
26	"Saigō Kichinosuke" (西郷吉之助, Saigō Kichinosuke)	Kazuki Watanabe	Kōchi, Kōchi about Okada Izō	June 27, 2010	17.9%
27	"Ryōma no ōshibai" (龍馬の大芝居, The Acting of Ryōma)	Keishi Ōtomo	Tama, Tokyo about Tanaka Mitsuaki	July 4, 2010	17.3%
28	"Takechi no yume" (武市の夢, The Dream of Takechi)	Keishi Ōtomo	Kōchi, Kōchi about Takechi Hanpeita	July 11, 2010	17.0%
SEASON 3 RYOMA THE NAVIGATOR
Episode	Title	Directed by	Travelogue	Original airdate	Rating
29	"Shintenchi, Nagasaki" (新天地、長崎, Our New World, Nagasaki)	Keishi Ōtomo	Nagasaki about Omoto	July 18, 2010	15.8%
30	"Ryōma no hisaku" (龍馬の秘策, The Secret Plan of Ryōma)	Kazuki Watanabe	Nagasaki about Glover	July 25, 2010	17.9%
31	"Saigō wa madaka" (西郷はまだか, Waiting for Saigō)	Toshitake Fukuoka	Nagasaki about Kameyama Shachū	August 1, 2010	16.0%
32	"Nerawareta Ryōma" (狙われた龍馬, Chased Ryōma)	Tōjō Kajiwara	Muroto, Kōchi about Nagaoka Shintarō	August 8, 2010	16.7%
33	"Kameyama Shachū no ōshigoto" (亀山社中の大仕事, The Big Job of Kameyama Shachū)	Keishi Ōtomo	Ureshino, Saga about Ōura Kei	August 15, 2010	13.7%
34	"Samurai, Chōjirō" (侍、長次郎, Samurai, Chōjirō)	Hitoshi Manabe	Nagasaki about Kondō Chōjirō	August 22, 2010	16.3%
35	"Satchō dōmei zeyo" (薩長同盟ぜよ, Satchō Alliance)	Kazuki Watanabe	Kyoto about Satchō Alliance	August 29, 2010	15.4%
36	"Teradaya sōdō" (寺田屋騒動, The Incident at Teradaya)	Keishi Ōtomo	Kyoto about Teradaya sōdō	September 5, 2010	16.8%
37	"Ryōma no tsuma" (龍馬の妻, The Wife of Ryōma)	Tōjō Kajiwara	Hagi, Yamaguchi about Takasugi Shinsaku	September 12, 2010	17.6%
38	"Kirishima no chikai" (霧島の誓い, The Promise in Kirishima)	Kazuki Watanabe	Kagoshima about Sakamoto Ryōma and Oryō	September 19, 2010	15.8%
FINAL SEASON RYOMA THE HOPE
Episode	Title	Directed by	Travelogue	Original airdate	Rating
39	"Bakan no kiseki" (馬関の奇跡, The Miracle in Bakan)	Keishi Ōtomo	Kitakyūshū about Kiheitai	September 26, 2010	13.7%
40	"Seifūtei no taiketsu" (清風亭の対決, The Confrontation in Seifūtei)	Kazuki Watanabe	Nagasaki about Sakamoto Ryōma	October 2, 2010	14.3%
41	"Saraba, Takasugi Shinsaku" (さらば高杉晋作, Farewell, Takasugi Shinsaku)	Keishi Ōtomo	Shimonoseki, Yamaguchi about Takasugi Shinsaku	October 10, 2010	16.3%
42	"Iroha maru jiken" (いろは丸事件, The Incident of Iroha Maru)	Tōjō Kajiwara	Fukuyama, Hiroshima about Kaientai	October 17, 2010	16.1%
43	"Senchū hassaku" (船中八策, The Eight Plans in Ship)	Kazuki Watanabe	Kyoto about Sakamoto Ryōma	October 24, 2010	18.0%
44	"Ame no tōbōsha" (雨の逃亡者, The Fugitive in Rain)	Toshitake Fukuoka	Nagasaki about Kakure Kirishitan	October 31, 2010	16.2%
45	"Ryōma no kyūjitsu" (龍馬の休日, The Holiday of Ryōma)	Takegorō Nishimura	Yokosuka, Kanagawa about Oryō	November 7, 2010	15.3%
46	"Tosa no ōshōbu" (土佐の大勝負, The Big Game of Tosa)	Tōjō Kajiwara	Kōchi, Kōchi about Sakamoto Ryōma	November 14, 2010	15.7%
47	"Taisei hōkan" (大政奉還, Taisei Hōkan)	Kazuki Watanabe	Kyoto about Taisei hōkan	November 21, 2010	17.6%
48	"Ryū no tamashii" (龍の魂, The Spirit of the Dragon)	Keishi Ōtomo	Kyoto about Sakamoto Ryōma	November 28, 2010	21.3%
Average rating 18.72% – Rating is based on Japanese Video Research (Kantō region).

=== Highlight ===
Season	Original airdate	Original airtime	Rating
Season 1	December 29, 2010	21:00–21:59	5.2%
Season 2	December 29, 2010	22:00–22:59	4.3%
Season 3	December 30, 2010	21:00–21:59	6.1%
Season 4	December 30, 2010	22:00–22:59	5.8%

- Navigator: Munetaka Aoki (Season 1, 2), Teruyuki Kagawa (Season 3, 4)

=== International ===
Country	Translation	Network(s)	Notes
Taiwan	Subtitled	Videoland Television Network	November 15, 2010 –
South Korea	Subtitled	Channel J	January 17, 2011 –
Thailand	Subtitled	Thai PBS	March 17, 2011 – September 1, 2011
Hong Kong	Dubbed/Subtitled	i-CABLE Entertainment Channel	May 9, 2011 –
United States	None	TV Japan	2010
Canada	None	TV Japan	2010
Puerto Rico	None	TV Japan	2010
Brazil	None	NHK	2010

== Soundtrack and books ==
=== Soundtrack ===
- NHK Taiga Drama Ryōmaden Original Soundtrack Vol.1 (January 27, 2010)
- NHK Taiga Drama Ryōmaden Original Soundtrack Vol.2 (May 26, 2010)
- NHK Taiga Drama Ryōmaden Original Soundtrack Vol.3 (September 8, 2010)

=== Books ===
Official guide

- NHK Taiga Drama Story Ryōmaden First Part ISBN 978-4-14-923353-6 (December 8, 2009)
- NHK Taiga Drama Story Ryōmaden Latter Part ISBN 978-4-14-923354-3 (June 30, 2010)
- NHK Taiga Drama Story Ryōmaden Last Part ISBN 978-4-14-923355-0 (October 22, 2010)
- NHK Taiga Drama, Historical Handbook, Ryōmaden ISBN 978-4-14-910730-1 (November 19, 2009)

Novel

- Ryōmaden I SEASON1 RYOMA THE DREAMER ISBN 978-4-14-005572-4 (November 28, 2009)
- Ryōmaden II SEASON2 RYOMA THE ADVENTURER ISBN 978-4-14-005573-1 (March 25, 2010)
- Ryōmaden III SEASON3 RYOMA THE NAVIGATOR ISBN 978-4-14-005574-8 (July 17, 2010)
- Ryōmaden IV SEASON4 RYOMA THE HOPE ISBN 978-4-14-005575-5 (October 9, 2010)

Photo album

- Masaharu Fukuyama - Sakamoto Ryōma Photo Album ISBN 978-4-06-216230-2 (July 1, 2010)
- Oryō - Yōko Maki Photo Album ISBN 978-4-14-081435-2 (September 22, 2010)
- 2010 Years, the Journey with Masaharu Fukuyama and Ryōma Sakamoto ISBN 978-4-06-216734-5 (December 9, 2010)

Comics and other

- Ryōmaden, Comic Version, First Volume ISBN 978-4-7767-2881-8 (January 25, 2010)
- Ryōmaden, Comic Version, Second Volume ISBN 978-4-7767-2919-8 (April 19, 2010)
- Ryōma Design. ISBN 978-4-344-01906-5 (November 2010)

== Reception ==
=== Impact ===
Ryōmaden made a huge impact in Japan. Kōchi, Sakamoto Ryoma's birthplace reported an increase in tourism when the drama started airing. The Bank of Japan (Koichi Branch) initially estimated the economic benefit to be around 23.4 billion yen. However, they have revised the estimation to 40.9 billion yen in April 2010, due to an increase in tourism because of 'Ryoma Fever.' The final estimation is around 52.5 billion yen, 2.3 times the value from the initial estimation. The Nagasaki Branch also estimated around 21 billion yen of economic benefit to Nagasaki, the place where Ryoma was in the Kaientai business. Copies of the necklace Ryoma wore are selling well, and it is the number one selling item in the NHK gift shop.

== Accolades ==
- 2010 Teamwork of the Year Award
- Hashida Sugako Awards ja:橋田賞 - Fukuyama Masaharu in Ryomaden
- Japan Tourism Agency Commissioner Award for Domestic Tourism- Fukuyama Masaharu
- TV Navi Awards for Best Principal Male Actor 2010 – Fukuyama Masaharu
- 4th Int'l Drama Festival, Tokyo Drama Award: Best Drama (Series Drama)
- 4th Int'l Drama Festival, Tokyo Drama Award: Best Performance by an Actor in a Supporting Role – Kagawa Teruyuki
- 4th Int'l Drama Festival, Tokyo Drama Award: Special Award – Filming staff of "Ryomaden"
- 2011 Elan d'Or Awards: Best Series (TV Guide Award)
- 2011 Elan d'Or Awards: Best Producer (TV) – Suzuki Kei
- 2011 Elan d'Or Awards: Newcomers of the Year – Kiritani Kenta & Sato Takeru
- 2011 Elan d'Or Awards: Special Prize – Terajima Shinobu
- 2011 Galaxy Awards: Special Award for Contribution to Art (Television category) Individual Award – Fukuyama Masaharu
