= Okada Izō =

Japanese samurai (1838–1865)

- Born: Okada Yoshifuru; February 14, 1838
- Died: July 3, 1865 (aged 27)
- Occupation: samurai
- Known for: Assassination of Honma Seiichiro

Okada Izō (岡田 以蔵; February 14, 1838 – July 3, 1865) was a Japanese samurai of the late Edo period, feared as one of the four most notable assassins of the Bakumatsu period. He was a member of Tosa Kinnō-tō (Tosa Imperialism party, a loyalist clique of Tosa) in his hometown, Tosa Domain. Izō and Tanaka Shinbei were active in Kyoto as assassins under the leadership of Takechi Hanpeita.

His personal name (imina (諱)) was Yoshifuru.

== Biography ==
Okada Izō was born in Iwamura, Kami, Tosa as the eldest son of a country samurai Okada Yoshihira. He had a younger brother named Okada Keikichi who also joined the Tosa Kinnō-tō.

First self-taught in swordplay, Okada later became a pupil of Takechi Hanpeita under Nakanishi-ha Ittō-ryū (中西派一刀流) school, a branch of Ono-ha Ittō-ryū school. Following Takechi, in September 1856 Okada went to Edo and studied Kyōshin Meichi-ryū at Shigakukan, which was the training hall of Momonoi Shunzō. He returned to Tosa the following year.

In 1860, Okada followed Takechi and practiced martial arts in Chūgoku and Kyushu regions. Takechi considered that house of Okada would have difficulties with covering travel expenses and so asked the feudal lord of Oka domain in Bungo province to accommodate his student. In Oka, Izō studied Jikishi-ryu school of kendo. Around May 1861, he left to Edo and returned to Tosa in April of the following year. The same year he joined Tosa Kinnō-tō, organized by Takechi and loyal to the Sonnō Jōi movement. For some reason however, he was later crossed off from the name list, along with Ike Kurata and 弘田恕助.

Starting with Inoue Saichiro, who was the shita metsuke (low class inspector of foot soldiers) of the Tosa Domain, Izō assassinated Honma Seiichiro who was his comrade, Ikeuchi Daigaku, Mori Magoroku, Ogawara Juzo, Watanabe Kinzan, and Ueda Jonosuke, who were government officials and yoriki (police sergeants) that belonged to the Kyoto City Magistrate, Tada Tatewaki (son of Nagano Shuzen who commanded Ansei no Taigoku [suppression of extremists by the Shogunate] and Murayama Kazue, who during the assassination was tied to a bridge and made a public display alive). Those killings were conducted in the name of "Heaven's punishment" (天誅, Tenchū), as Takechi called it. Izō became known as 'Hitokiri (man-slayer) Izō' and feared, with a fellow hitokiri Tanaka Shinbei of Satsuma Province.

Izō later worked as a bodyguard; in 1863 Izō, owing to the mediation of Sakamoto Ryōma, was hired by Katsu Kaishu. Three assassins attacked Kaishu, but when Izō cut one of them down and gave a roar, the remaining two assassins ran away. Katsu, confident in Izō's skill as his own bodyguard, made him become a bodyguard of Nakahama Manjirō. When they went to a western style grave that Manjirō had built, four assassins tried to attack Manjirō, but Izō had sensed the two ambushes that were hiding, and told Manjirō not to escape impulsively but to stay put with his back against the gravestone, and slew the two attackers down. The remaining two attackers made an escape.

After the Coup of August 18 in 1863, the Tosa Kinnō-tō lost its momentum. Around June 1864, he was captured by a shogunate official, and on the charge of being tattooed, he was banished from the capital Kyoto; at the same time, an official of the Tosa Domain captured him, and deported him to his hometown.

In 1865 however, he was involved in yet another assassination, that of Yoshida Tōyō, the regent of Tosa whom he killed before his rise to power. In the Tosa Domain, all his comrades of the Tosa Kinnō-tō were arrested for that assassination and the series of assassinations that took place in the capital Kyoto. With the exception of Takechi, who was a Joshi (superior warrior) rank, they all underwent severe torture. Takechi, who learned of Izō's arrest, wrote in a letter to his home, 'it is better for such a fool to die soon, and how his parents would lament over him for returning unashamedly to his hometown,’ which indicates his ill feeling towards Izō. Letters which were considered to be written by Tauchi Keikichi (Takechi’s real younger brother) and so on tell that since his house stood in Shichiken machi, Izō was also disdainfully referred to as '七以.’ On learning of Izō's arrest, some comrades both in and out of prison, including the Yamauchi family who was behind Yoshida's assassination, became afraid that Izō's confession may put them on line, and planned to poison Izō; however, Takechi successfully argued against the plan. Izō endured severe torture, but he finally made a full confession and was beheaded on May 11, 1865, and his head was put on public display.

His death poem read 'My mind that served for you came to nothing, and will only clear up after you've gone.' (君か為 尽す心は 水の泡 消にしのちそ すみ渡るべき)

His grave is the family grave in the mountains near Azo Station at Kōchi City, Kōchi Prefecture. He was buried under his personal name, Okada Yoshifuru.

There are some photographs passed around as photos of Izō, but most of them show Chojiro Kondo and Seizo Okada. There are no known photographs of actual Izō.

== Izō in fiction ==
Several films feature Okada Izō as protagonist, most notably Hideo Gosha's Hitokiri (1969) (portrayed by Shintaro Katsu) and Takashi Miike's Izo (2004) (portrayed by Kazuya Nakayama). The NHK Taiga drama Ryōmaden (2009) featured him several times (portrayed by Takeru Sato) as one of Sakamoto Ryōma's friends and Takechi Hanpeita's assassins.

In manga, Nobuhiro Watsuki based the character Kurogasa Udō Jin-e of his series Rurouni Kenshin on Izō; the author admits that the character bears little resemblance to Izō. Hideaki Sorachi also based Nizo Okada, a character in his work Gintama, on Izō. Masami Kurumada, author of the popular Saint Seiya manga series, more recently added a character to his work, called Capricorn Izō, who is inspired by Okada. The manga Assassin by Hiroshi Hirata is based on the same story depicted in the film Hitokiri.

In the video game Way of the Samurai 4, one of the characters, Kogure, may be inspired by Izō Okada.

Okada also appeared in Kengo, a video game based on nine legendary swordsmen. In the game, his full name is revealed to be Okada Izō Nobutoshi and it is explained he uses a Goken style of swordsmanship, meaning to overpower the opponent through physical strength and audacious assaults, much like the Jigen-ryu used by some other hitokiri of the Bakumatsu period.

Okada appears as a character in the 2014 video game Ryū ga Gotoku Ishin!, as well as its 2023 remake, bearing similarities with Yakuza series character Akira Nishikiyama.

In 2018 he appeared in the mobile game Fate/Grand Order as an Assassin-class Servant.

Okada appears as a character in the 2024 video game "Rise of the Rōnin". His name is done as Izo Okada.
