= Like a Dragon: Ishin! =

2014 video game

Ryū ga Gotoku Ishin!
- Developer: Ryu Ga Gotoku Studio
- Publisher: Sega
- Director: Hiroyuki Sakamoto
- Producer: Masayoshi Yokoyama
- Programmer: Koji Tokieda
- Artist: Nobuaki Mitake
- Writer: Masayoshi Yokoyama
- Composers: Chihiro Aoki; Hidenori Shoji
- Series: Like a Dragon
- Platforms: PlayStation 3; PlayStation 4
- Release: JP: February 22, 2014
- Genres: Action-adventure, hack and slash
- Mode: Single-player

Ryū ga Gotoku Ishin! (Note: Japanese: 龍が如く 維新！; lit. "Like a Dragon: Restoration!") is a 2014 action-adventure video game developed by Ryu Ga Gotoku Studio and published by Sega for the PlayStation 3 and PlayStation 4. A spin-off of the Like a Dragon / Yakuza series, it was released on February 22, 2014, exclusively in Japan, serving as a launch title for the PlayStation 4. A remake, Like a Dragon: Ishin!, (Note: Known in Japan as Ryū ga Gotoku Ishin! Kiwami (Japanese: 龍が如く 維新！ 極; lit. "Like a Dragon: Restoration! Extreme")) was released in February 2023 for PlayStation 4, PlayStation 5, Windows, Xbox One, and Xbox Series X/S. It was developed using Unreal Engine 4, and received a worldwide release unlike the original game.

Set in the chaotic Bakumatsu (1853–1867) phase of the Late Edo period, players take on the role of Sakamoto Ryōma, who is distressed resulting from conflicting pressures and uncertainty about one's self and role in the society. Being embroiled in the middle of a Tosa coup d'état and bent on finding the murderer who assassinated his father figure, Ryōma burrows himself with a hidden identity in the streets of Kyo and joins the grim Shinsengumi.

== Gameplay ==
Like other titles in the Like a Dragon series, Ishin! utilizes a robust combat system, notably similar to its predecessor Yakuza 5. Players control the sole playable protagonist, Sakamoto Ryōma, and have access to a total of four fighting styles: Swordsman (which uses a katana as the primary weapon), Gunman (which uses pistols), Brawler (which uses hand-to-hand combat, more similar to the traditional combat style), and Wild Dancer (which uses a combination of katana and pistol). The game introduces a new system, Virtue, which can be gained by completing side-quests, story events, gaining Completion Points, and other tasks. Virtue points can be exchanged for abilities. The game features new types of side content, the biggest of which being Battle Dungeon, a dungeon crawling mode which utilizes special ability cards (also known as Trooper Cards), and Another Life, a side-story where Ryōma must pay off the debts of Haruka, a girl in debt due to illness. There are also returning series staples like Gambling, Singing Bar (Karaoke), and a fighting arena, among other minigames.

== Synopsis ==
=== Setting and characters ===
Ryū ga Gotoku Ishin! is set in the 1860s Japan during the Bakumatsu era at the end of the Edo period. Japan is thrown into turmoil after the arrival of Western ships, galvanizing the imperialist ideals of the Shishi, who wish to rebuild the nation around the Emperor by overthrowing the Bakufu and expelling foreigners. The game features an open world focusing on a powerful feudal domain and castle town in east Japan, Tosa, and Japan's capital city at the time, Kyo. Kyo is divided into several key areas: the hospitality district Fushimi, the red light district Gion, the bustling Rakunai, the deserted Rakugai, and the perilous Mukurogai. The Shinsengumi, a notorious police force organized by the Bakufu, are headquartered in Kyo, where the majority of the game takes place.

Ishin! features an ensemble cast, the majority of whom are loosely based on real Japanese historical figures. The majority of the characters' appearances are adapted from various existing characters in the Like a Dragon franchise. The primary protagonist of the game is Sakamoto Ryōma (Takaya Kuroda), a disgraced rōnin from Tosa who seeks to avenge his murdered adoptive father, Yoshida Tōyō (Unshō Ishizuka). Escaping to Kyo as a wanted man, Ryōma joins the Shinsengumi using the alias Saitō Hajime, in order to track down Tōyō's murderer. Notable members of the Shinsengumi include: Chief Kondō Isami (Eiichiro Funakoshi/Akio Otsuka), Deputy Chief Hijikata Toshizō (Nakamura Shidō II), Military Advisor Itō Kashitarō (George Takahashi/Hitoshi Ozawa), Inspector Yamazaki Susumu (Nobutoshi Canna/Yuichi Nakamura), and the Division Captains: Okita Sōji (Hidenari Ugaki), Nagakura Shinpachi (Rikiya Koyama), Matsubara Chūji (Hiroki Tōchi), Takeda Kanryūsai (Shun Sugata/Riki Takeuchi), Inoue Genzaburō (Shunsuke Sakuya), Tani Sanjūrō (Kenji Hamada/Masanori Takeda), Tōdō Heisuke (Shunsuke Daito/Nobuhiko Okamoto), Suzuki Mikisaburō (Ryōta Takeuchi/Ayumi Tanida), and Harada Sanosuke (Hiroki Yasumoto).

Ryōma is also supported by other allies, including: Katsura Kogorō (Koichi Yamadera), leader of the Chōshū Loyalist Party; Saigō Kichinosuke (Masami Iwasaki), General Commander of the Satsuma Domain Army; Nakaoka Shintarō (Kazuhiro Yamaji), Tōyō's former retainer who cooperates with Ryōma to investigate Tōyō's death; Otose (Romi Park), the proprietor of Teradaya Inn where Ryōma stays at during his time in Kyo; Oryō (Nanami Sakuraba/Manami Sugihara), a young woman who works at Teradaya as Otose's apprentice; the Bathkeeper of Sai (Yoshiaki Fujiwara), a renowned information broker in Kyo; and Ikumatsu (Aya Hirano), a geisha who operates as a spy for the Chōshū Loyalist Party.

The primary antagonist of Ishin! is Takechi Hanpeita (Katsunori Takahashi/Hideo Nakano), Ryōma's sworn brother who commands the Tosa Loyalist Party following Tōyō's death. Takechi is supported by his right-hand man, Okada Izō (Kazuhiro Nakaya), a notorious assassin also known as "Izō the Butcher". Other antagonists include: Sasaki Tadasaburō (Rintarō Nishi), commander of the shogunate police force Mimawarigumi; Katsu Rintarō (Kenyu Horiuchi/Kohsuke Toriumi), Admiral of the Bakufu Navy; Tokugawa Yoshinobu (Satoshi Tokushige), the 15th Shogun of the Tokugawa clan; and Yamauchi Yōdō (Hiroaki Yoshida), the ruthless daimyo of the Tosa Domain.

=== Plot ===
In 1866, after finishing sword training in Edo, Sakamoto Ryōma returns to his hometown in Tosa and reunites with his adoptive father, Yoshida Tōyō, and his sworn brother, Takechi Hanpeita. Tōyō, who is a government magistrate, seeks to end the rigid social class system in Tosa, and implores Ryōma to aid his cause by joining the Tosa Loyalist Party. Ryōma, Takechi and Tōyō meet at Kōchi Castle, where they discuss plans to negotiate with the ministers. However, a masked assassin appears and mortally wounds Tōyō, and escapes after defeating Ryōma and Takechi in combat. Having been accused of murdering Tōyō, Ryōma escapes captivity, vowing to return to Tosa to prove his innocence once he captures the assassin.

One year later, Ryōma resides in Kyo, going by the alias Saitō Hajime. He wanders several renowned dojo, inquiring information about the Tennen Rishin, a fighting style which was used by Tōyō's assassin. After encountering an individual who calls himself Niibori Matsusuke, Ryōma is introduced to the Bathkeeper of Sai, an information broker who reveals to him that the Tennen Rishin style is practiced by the founders of the Shinsengumi. Believing that the assassin is one of the founding members, Ryōma decides to join their ranks. Ryōma later reunites with Takechi in the Mukurogai district, where he learns that the latter had become a jōshi and allied himself with the elders of Tosa. Takechi expresses disapproval of Ryōma's decision to join the Shinsengumi, causing the latter to denounce their brotherhood and depart.

The next day, Ryōma goes to the Shinsengumi's headquarters in Mibu to enlist. After impressing Second Division Captain Nagakura Shinpachi in a duel, Ryōma personally meets with the Deputy Chief, Hijikata Toshizō, who appoints him as Third Division Captain after executing the previous captain, Yamanami Keisuke, for desertion. Ryōma is later contacted by Nakaoka Shintarō, Tōyō's former retainer who believes Takechi is the real mastermind behind Tōyō's assassination. After surviving an ambush by Tosa loyalists, Ryōma and Nakaoka part ways as they agree to cooperate. In one of his first assignments, Ryōma accompanies several Shinsengumi captains to apprehend Okada Izō, Takechi's right-hand man who has gained notoriety for assassinating several Bakufu leaders. Ryōma defeats Izō after he kills two Shinsengumi captains, and allows Kyo's police to detain him. Ryōma later learns that Izō is to be taken to Tosa to face Lord Yamauchi Yōdō, possibly implicating Takechi and the loyalists. Some time later, Ryōma joins the Shinsengumi to raid a loyalist meeting at Ikedaya Inn. Ryōma encounters Niibori, who reveals his true identity as Katsura Kogorō, leader of the Chōshū Loyalist Party. At Katsura's request, Ryōma pretends to fight him and lose, allowing him to escape the Shinsengumi.

Ryōma eventually learns that there is an imposter using his name, who has been making arms deals with the British, with the backing of Navy Admiral Katsu Rintarō. He attempts to interrogate Satsuma Domain Army commander Saigō Kichinosuke, though the latter refuses to divulge any information. Ryōma is summoned by Shinsengumi Chief Kondō Isami, who is also aware of the former's identity. Kondō reveals that he plans to stage an attack that would leave Kyo in ruins, forcing Emperor Meiji to relocate to Edo and make it Japan's new capital; he requests Ryōma to aid his cause, promising to reveal Tōyō's killer to him, but Ryōma refuses. First Division Captain Okita Sōji, who overheard the conversation, later challenges Ryōma to a fight while pretending to be the killer, and ultimately loses. Ryōma then receives a letter from Nakaoka, informing him that Takechi had been executed in Tosa. In a drunken state of depression, Ryōma manages to stop a scuffle between Katsura and Saigō, allowing the two of them to befriend one another and end their ancestral feud.

The next day, Ryōma learns that Sixth Division Captain Inoue Genzaburō had been killed, causing unrest within the Shinsengumi. Okita accuses Ryōma of having carried out the murder, but Kondō intervenes and reveals the truth: Inoue, whose true identity was Serizawa Kamo, was hired by Ryōma's imposter to assassinate Tōyō a year prior; he, alongside his fellow exiled Mito comrades Hirayama Gorō and Hirama Jūsuke, were targeted by the real Okita, Inoue and Nagakura, but Serizawa killed them in self-defense. Kondō and Hijikata agreed to keep this event a secret, and had Serizawa, Hirayama and Hirama take up the identities of Inoue, Okita and Nagakura, while also passing down their fighting technique to other Shinsengumi captains as the Tennen Rishin style. Kondō reveals further that the fake Ryōma had been staying at Teradaya Inn, and the Shinsengumi was planning to raid the area. Ryōma and Okita arrive at Teradaya and confront the imposter; amidst their fight, Ryōma notices a scar on the imposter's back, resembling that of Takechi. The imposter escapes, while the Mimawarigumi arrive, declaring that the Shinsengumi is barred from pursuing this case further as they take over. Ryōma later reports to Kondō and learns that Katsura and Saigō have united their armies to form the Satchō Alliance, as they prepare to wage war with the Bakufu. Ryōma and Okita travel to Edo and storm Edo Castle, where they confront Shogun Tokugawa Yoshinobu. Ryōma hands Yoshinobu a letter from Kondō, setting the terms for the Great Restoration, which would end the Tokugawa's reign and restore power to the Imperial Court, as well as abolish the class system. Yoshinobu agrees to concede, preventing all-out war with the loyalists.

Ryōma and Okita return to Kyo and find it engulfed in flames. After finding a dying Kondō, Ryōma confronts his killer, Izō, and defeats him. In his final breath, Izō confirms that Takechi has been posing as Ryōma as part of his plot to ignite a war between the Emperor and the Bakufu. The next day, Hijikata summons the remaining Shinsengumi captains and exposes Military Advisor Itō Kashitarō for his complicity in Kondō's death. Itō, alongside captains Takeda Kanryūsai and Tōdō Heisuke, announce their defection as they form a new organization, the Goryo Eji, comprising a large number of Shinsengumi troops. Tōdō later reveals to Ryōma, Hijikata, Okita, and Nagakura that he has been spying on Itō, per Kondō's order. Upon learning that Takechi and Itō intend to set up a meeting with loyalist representatives, the Shinsengumi attempts to stage a trap. Tōdō, however, is fatally wounded by Takeda, who is killed by Ryōma in retaliation. Meanwhile, Takechi had anticipated the Shinsengumi's attack and set up a decoy to attend the meeting in his place. As the Shinsengumi raids the meeting, Katsura and Saigō manage to escape while Nakaoka is injured. Ryōma kills the decoy, but is stopped by Itō and Mimawarigumi commander Sasaki Tadasaburō, while Takechi escapes, telling Ryōma to meet him at Tosa.

Ryōma and the Shinsengumi captains stage an assault on Takechi's stronghold in Tosa, fighting through Mimawarigumi and Goryo Eji forces, as well as Takechi's British allies. Ryōma confronts Takechi alone and defeats him but cannot bring himself to kill his sworn brother. Takechi finally realizes that he cannot save Japan through force of arms alone and reveals Yōdō as the true mastermind behind his plan. Yōdō arrives and shoots both Ryōma and Takechi, boasting his intention to allow the British to use Tosa as their foothold to turn Japan into a British colony. As his allies arrive to corner Yōdō, Ryōma declare that Japan is capable of maintaining independence, and subsequently kills Yōdō. Two years later, it is revealed that Takechi has assumed Yōdō's identity and used his position to usher in the Meiji Restoration, restoring imperial rule in Japan. Nakaoka, who managed to recover from his injuries, begins to write a novel about Ryōma under the pen name Sakazaki Shinran. Meanwhile, Ryōma has decided to discard his name and live as Saitō, retiring to a quiet life in the countryside.

In an epilogue, taking place in the present day, a man and his son are seen observing a statue of Ryōma. The man encourages his son to follow him until he can find his own path, comparing themselves to the people of Japan following Ryōma's ideals. (Note: The present-day epilogue was cut from the remake version.)

== Development and release ==
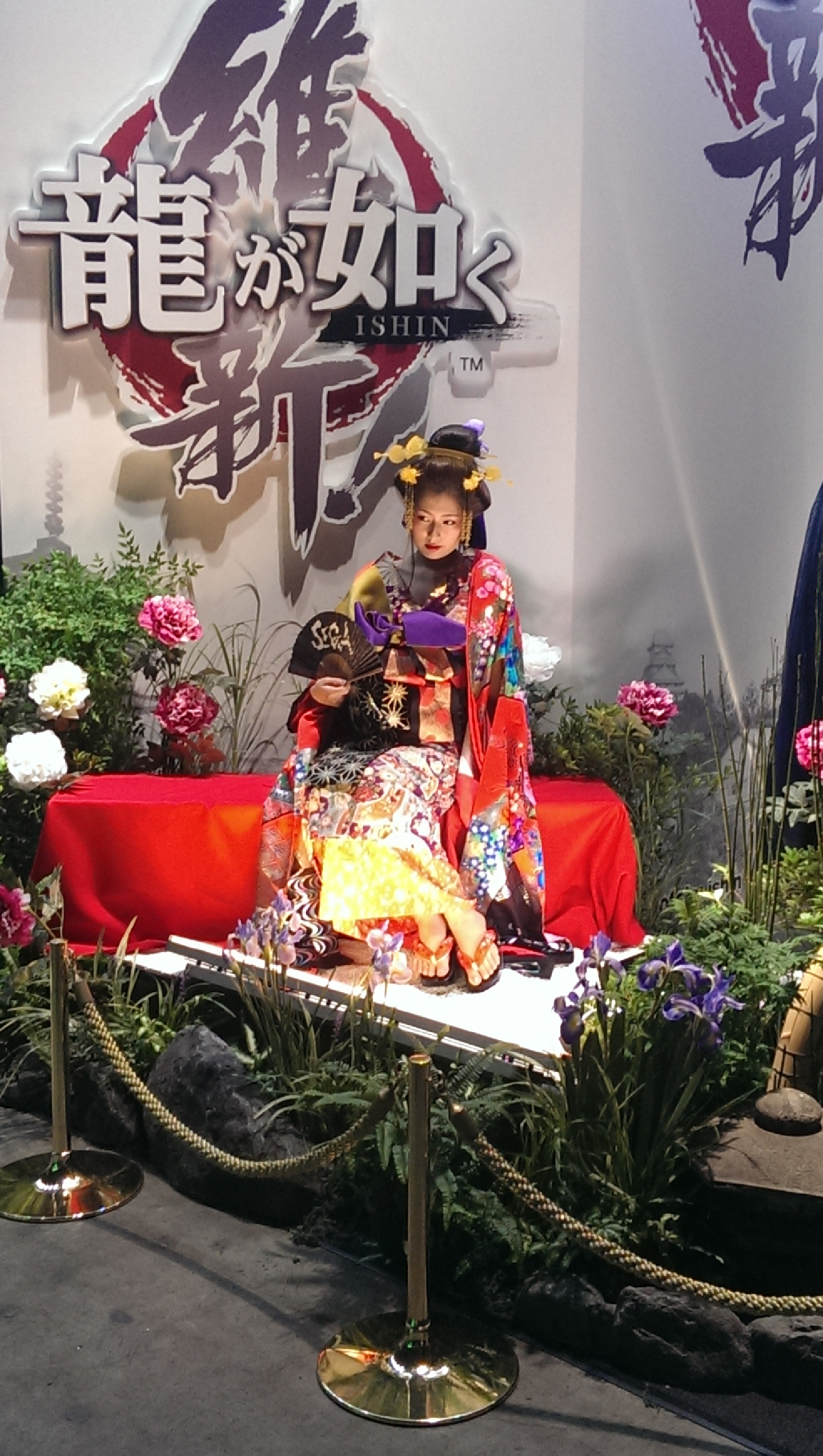
Promotion at TGS 2013

A 2.4GB playable demo named Ryū ga Gotoku Ishin! Demo Version (龍が如く 維新！ 体験版) was made available for download on the Japanese PlayStation Store on February 13, 2014.

On February 13, 2014, a 2.6GB free version named Ryū ga Gotoku Ishin! Free App for PlayStation Vita (龍が如く 維新！ 無料アプリ for PlayStation Vita) was made available for download on the Japanese PlayStation Store.

On February 22, 2014, a 200KB DLC named Digest Narration Voice (ダイジェストナレーションボイス) was made available on the Japanese PlayStation Store priced at ¥300.

Ryū ga Gotoku Ishin! sold 138,158 copies on PlayStation 3 and 82,540 copies on PlayStation 4, for a total of 220,698 copies on its first two days on sale. As of March 31, 2014, the game has sold 390,000 copies. The original Ishin! was awarded near-perfect scores of 38/40 and 39/40 on PlayStation 3 and PlayStation 4 respectively by Famitsu.

== Remake ==
Like a Dragon: Ishin!
- Developer: Ryu Ga Gotoku Studio
- Publisher: Sega
- Director: Yasuaki Uehara
- Producer: Hiroyuki Sakamoto
- Programmer: Tatsuya Kato
- Artist: Daisuke Fukagawa
- Writer: Masayoshi Yokoyama
- Composers: Hidenori Shoji; Chihiro Aoki
- Series: Like a Dragon
- Engine: Unreal Engine 4
- Platforms: PlayStation 4; PlayStation 5; Windows; Xbox One; Xbox Series X/S
- Release: WW: February 21, 2023; AS: February 22, 2023
- Genres: Action-adventure, hack and slash
- Mode: Single-player

On September 14, 2022, the Ryu Ga Gotoku Studio official Twitter account announced a remake of Ryū ga Gotoku Ishin! titled Like a Dragon: Ishin!, which was released on February 21, 2023. The decision to bring over Ishin! was influenced by success of Western titles like Ghost of Tsushima, which also shared the premise of a historical samurai setting. Actual development began in September 2021, after the team conducted basic research on Unreal Engine development, and lasted for about 18 months.

The remake of Ishin! retains most of the gameplay system from the original game, with the exception of the Trooper Cards, which can now be used optionally in regular combat. Certain enemy encounters are also adjusted by giving boss enemies special abilities. In addition, several characters of the game were also recast with new actors, who have previously portrayed other characters in the mainline titles, notably from Yakuza 0, Yakuza 6: The Song of Life, and Yakuza: Like a Dragon. The singing bar (karaoke) minigame features two songs not featured in the original: a new arrangement of the series' fan favorite karaoke track, "Baka Mitai" (ばかみたい, I've Been a Fool), and an entirely new track, "Ichizu Samurai" (い・ち・ず・侍, Truehearted Samurai), alongside the five songs featured in the original game, with translated lyrics in not only English, Traditional Chinese and Korean, but French, German, Italian, Spanish and Simplified Chinese, a first in the series. An option to switch between the Japanese kanji & romaji (if set to English, French, German, Italian, Spanish, Simplified Chinese, Traditional Chinese or Korean; Japanese kanji only if set to Japanese) lyrics and the translated lyrics, which is previously in the Yakuza Remastered Collection, is also available for all languages besides Japanese.

Despite the studio's recent titles released prior such as Yakuza: Like a Dragon and the Judgment series feature a multi-language voice-over dubbing support, this feature was excluded in the remake of Ishin!, resulting it is only playable in the Japanese voice-over audio, much like the original game. In an interview at the 2022 Tokyo Game Show, Ryu Ga Gotoku Studio's director Masayoshi Yokoyama explained the decision was made due to the complexity of translating the dialogue of the Bakumatsu era, stating "that would make the lines incredibly long so it just wouldn’t work".

In January 2023, Sega announced a downloadable content bundle for Ishin!, titled "Elite General Trooper Cards", which contains six Trooper Cards based on certain celebrities, including All Elite Wrestling's Kenny Omega, actor Rahul Kohli and VTuber Nyatasha Nyanners.

On February 16, 2023, the Sega official Twitter announced a Combat Demo for PlayStation 5, Xbox Series X/S, and Steam.

=== Reception ===
Reception

Aggregate scores
Aggregator	Score
Metacritic	(PC) 80/100 (PS5) 81/100 (XSXS) 79/100
OpenCritic	86% recommend (Note: Based on 138 reviews)

Review scores
Publication	Score
Destructoid	8/10
Digital Trends	3.5/5
Game Informer	8.25/10
GameSpot	8/10
GamesRadar+	4.5/5
IGN	7/10
NME	4/5
PC Gamer (US)	78/100
Push Square	8/10
RPGFan	85/100
Shacknews	8/10
Video Games Chronicle	4/5
VG247	5/5

Like a Dragon: Ishin! received "generally favorable" reviews, according to review aggregator Metacritic.

Eurogamer liked the game's side stories but felt it retained much of its early eighth-gen DNA, "Despite being rebuilt from the ground up in Unreal Engine 4, it feels as though the team has stuck with the same building plans as the original, where loading screens separate interiors and neighbouring locations, while NPCs retain the awkward, late-PS3 marionette look and movements". Polygon praised the game's depiction of 19th century Kyoto, writing, "The environments are gorgeously rendered, with unpaved roads punctuated by maple trees and streams that run through the city".

==== Sales ====
Like a Dragon: Ishin! sold 35,897 physical copies on PlayStation 4, and 31,439 physical copies on PlayStation 5, resulting in a total of 67,336 physical copies sold within its first 5 days of release in Japan. Both versions remained in the top 30 by their fourth week of release, selling a cumulative total of 85,725 physical copies.
