= Samurai Sensei =

- Also known as: Samurai Teacher
- サムライせんせい
- Genre: Drama, comedy
- Created by: Esusuke Kuroe (manga)
- Written by: Tsutomu Kuroiwa
- Directed by: Osamu Katayama; Hisashi Kimura
- Starring: Ryo Nishikido; Ryunosuke Kamiki; Manami Higa
- Opening theme: Samurai Song by Kanjani Eight
- Country of origin: Japan
- Original language: Japanese
- No. of episodes: 8

Production
- Producer: Satoko Uchiyama
- Running time: 60 min (Japan)

Original release
- Network: TV Asahi
- Release: 23 October – 11 December 2015

Samurai Sensei (サムライせんせい) is a 2015 Japanese television drama based on the manga written by Esusuke Kuroe about a samurai who time-travelled 150 years to modern day Japan. The series was broadcast by TV Asahi from 13 October to 11 December 2015.

== Plot ==
While committing seppuku during the Bakumatsu period in Japan, Takechi Hanpeita (Ryo Nishikido) finds himself unwittingly transported to modern-day rural Japan. The disconcerted samurai is taken in by a kind-hearted elderly man who runs a tuition centre, much to the dismay of the latter's grandchildren Haruka and Toranosuke. Despite making little effort to conceal his disdain for the Westernisation of his beloved homeland, Hanpeita finds himself slowly adapting to his new life while figuring ways to get back to his wife.

== Cast ==
- Ryo Nishikido as Takechi Hanpeita
- Ryunosuke Kamiki as Sakamoto Ryōma
- Manami Higa as Haruka Saeki
- Ryusei Fujii as Toranosuke Saeki
- Yuina Kuroshima as Sachiko Akagi
- Nicole Ishida as Rio Shinohara
- Zen Kajihara as Kiichi Komiyama
- Leo Morimoto as Makoto Saeki
