= Devil's door =

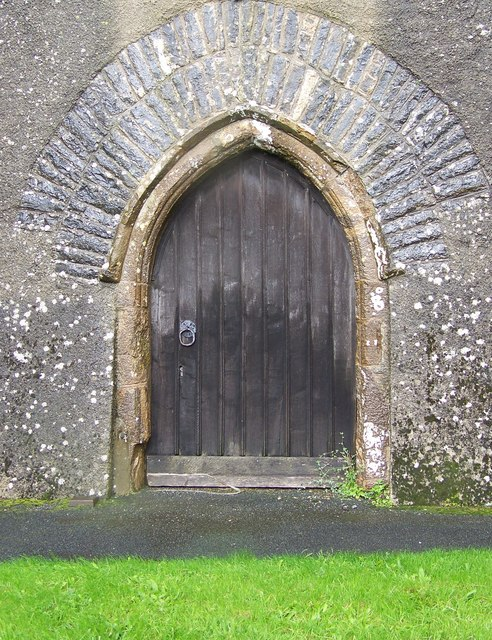
The Devil's door at the Church of St Peter and St Paul, Broadhempston, Devon

A devil's door is a structural feature found in the north wall of some medieval and older churches in the United Kingdom. They are particularly common in the historic county of Sussex, where more than 40 extant churches have one. They supposedly have their origins in the early Christian era, when pre-Christian worship was still popular, and were often merely symbolic structures—although they were sometimes used as genuine entrances.

In a 2023 study, historian Geoffrey Sedlezky argues that the idea of a devil's door is a late 19th-century invention. Although the idea refers to medieval liturgical practices, the assumption that the northern church door was associated with the devil is a retrospective reconstruction, largely fuelled by 19th-century preoccupation with the occult. In addition, there was a great interest in the historicisation of medieval churches, which led to the search for an explanation for the frequent occurrence of closed-up northern entrances.

== Functions ==
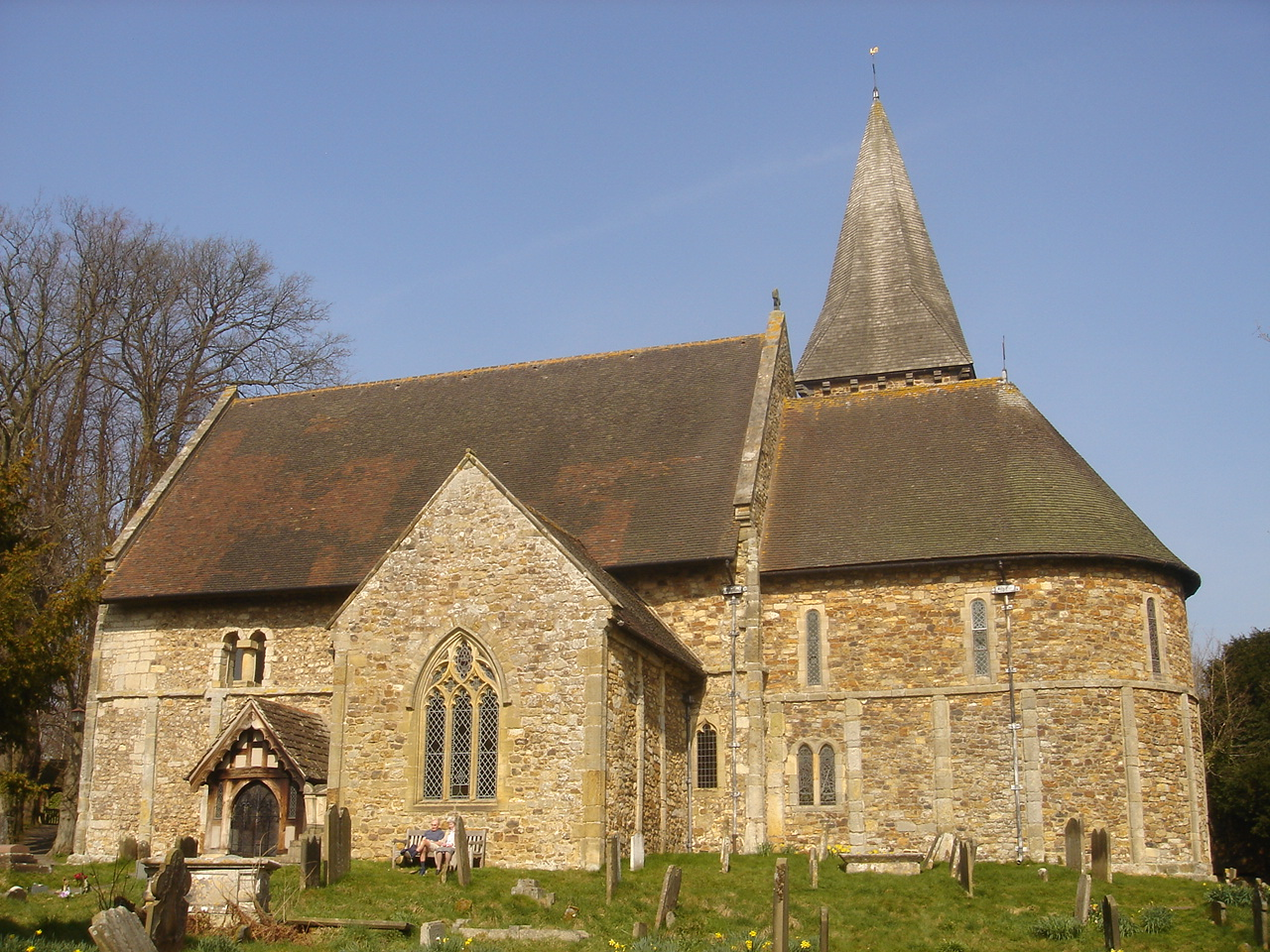
The Saxon-era St Nicholas' Church at Worth, West Sussex, has a devil's door

Before and during the Middle Ages, the north face of a church was considered to belong to the Devil and to people considered heathen. Churches were generally built to the north of roads and tracks, to ensure their main entrance was on the south side. It was also common for them to be built on pre-Christian sacred sites. Such places were still considered sacred by their former worshippers, who would often continue to visit them. A doorway would often be inserted in the "heathen" north side of the church to allow them to enter and worship on the site. Because of the association of that side with the Devil, the name "Devil's door" became established.

A later, and more common, purpose (especially in Sussex) was to allow the Devil to escape from the church. A widespread belief in the Middle Ages held that the Devil resided in an unbaptised child's soul; at the baptism, the Devil would be driven out of the child and had to be able to leave. Accordingly, a door was often built into the north wall for this purpose. These doors were often too small to have any real use, and were therefore only figurative. Most of the doors that remain have been bricked up—reputedly to prevent the Devil re-entering.

== Examples ==
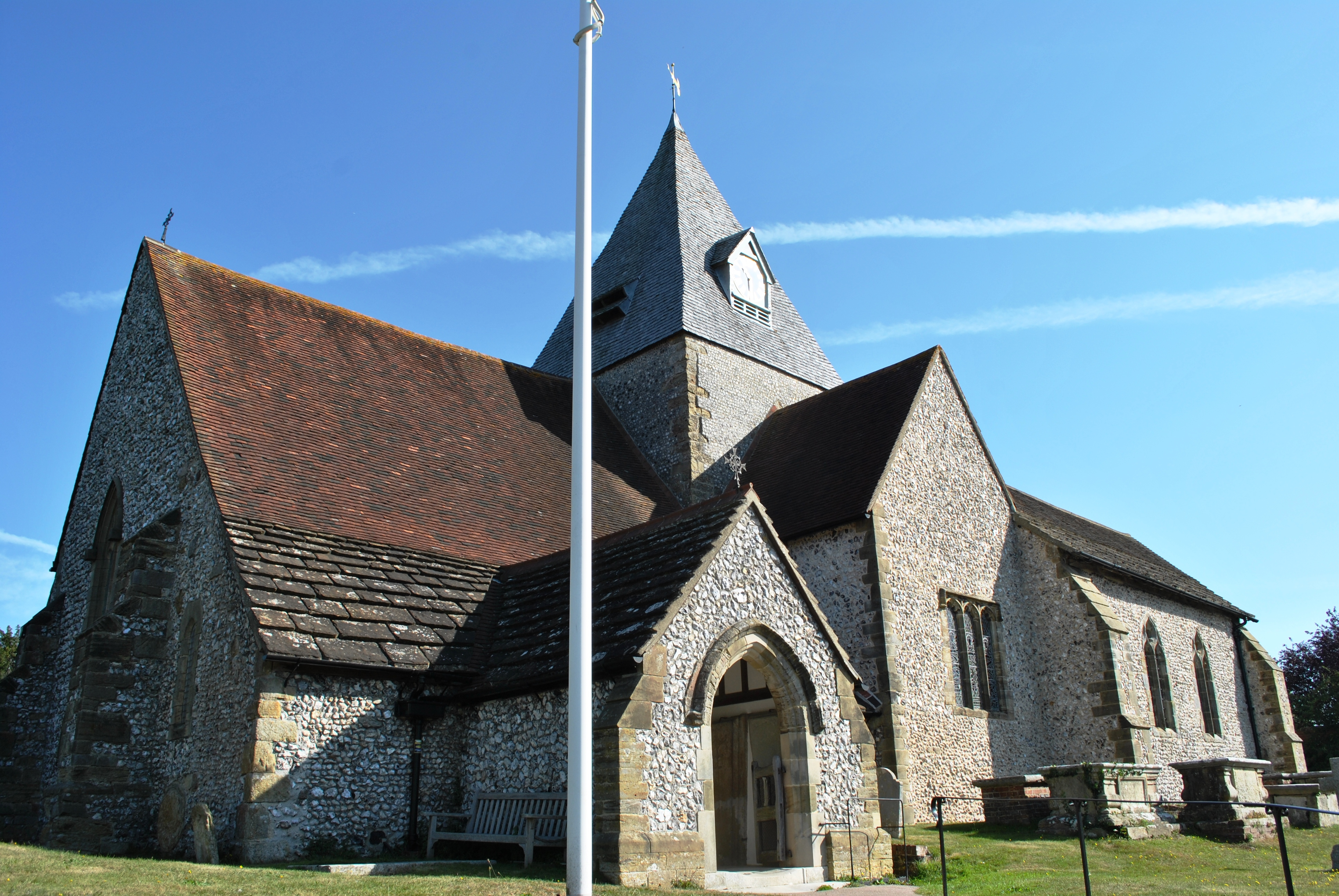
St Margaret's Church, Ditchling, Devil's door

Devil's doors can be found throughout Britain, but are concentrated in the county of Sussex, where notable examples include:

- St Margaret's Church, Ditchling
- St Peter's Church, Hamsey
- St Helen's Church, Hangleton
- All Saints Church, Patcham
- St Mary the Blessed Virgin, Sompting
- St Nicholas' Church, Worth

== See also ==
- Sarugatsuji
