= Sarugatsuji =

Northeast corner of the wall of the Kyoto Imperial Palace

Coordinates: 35°01′38″N 135°45′49″E

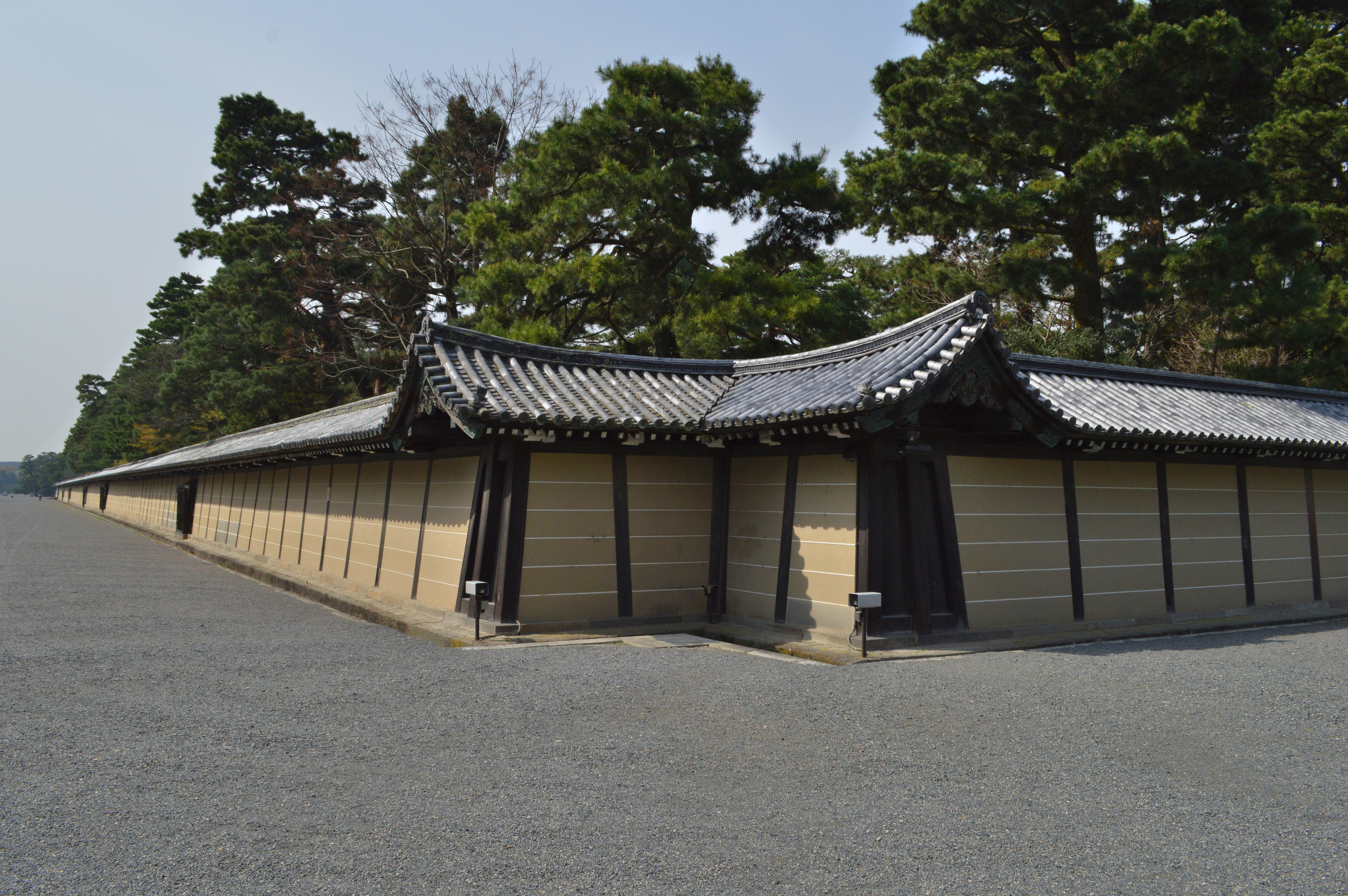
The Sarugatsuji in 2016, looking southwest.

The Sarugatsuji (猿ヶ辻; lit. 'monkey's crossroads') is the northeast corner of the wall of the Kyoto Imperial Palace.

== Summary ==
Under the influence of the Chinese geomancy imported by the Imperial Court in ancient times, the northeast direction (艮) became an object of superstition. In any building, the exterior corner facing northeast, called a kimon (鬼門; lit. 'ghost gate'), was believed to provide a means by which evil spirits and bad luck could enter.

In order to prevent such things from entering the palace grounds, the northeast corner was built in an unusual concave shape. By avoiding a convex vertex pointing in the direction of the kimon, the wall, and indeed the entire palace, could be regarded as technically having no "northeast corner". This was long regarded as a reliable apotropaic technique for "sealing" the kimon.

A wooden sculpture of a monkey wearing an eboshi hat was placed under the eaves of the Sarugatsuji. This is believed to have been done because the shinshi of Hiei Shrine, located northeast of the palace, was said to have appeared in the shape of a monkey. The monkey of Hiei Shrine was named Masaru (まさる; lit. 'honest monkey'), which is a homophone of ma saru (魔去る; lit. 'evil spirits begone').

In 1868, during the Battle of Toba–Fushimi, the Nishi Hongan-ji sent 100 men led by the monk Tokunyo (徳如) to protect the Sarugatsuji.

== 1863 murder of Anegakōji Kintomo ==
On the night of July 5, 1863, the senior official Anegakōji Kintomo was assassinated near the Sarugatsuji in what became known as the Sakuheimon incident. Tanaka Shinbei's sword was found at the scene of the murder, but he denied killing Anegakōji and performed harakiri during his interrogation. The real culprit was never identified. The Sakuheimon incident was dramatically depicted in the 1969 film Hitokiri.

== See also ==
- Devil's door
