= Four Hitokiri of the Bakumatsu =

Group of Japanese samurai

The Four Hitokiri of the Bakumatsu (幕末四大人斬り, Bakumatsu Yondai Hitokiri) was a term given to four samurai during the Bakumatsu era in Japanese history. The four men were Kawakami Gensai, Kirino Toshiaki (also known as Nakamura Hanjirō), Tanaka Shinbei, and Okada Izō. They opposed the Tokugawa shogunate (and later, supported the Meiji Emperor). These four samurai were warrior elite and widely considered undefeatable by normal people. The word hitokiri literally means "manslayer" or "man cutter," as the kanji 人 means person, while 斬 can alternatively mean slay or cut.

== In fiction ==
- Hitokiri is a 1969 film directed by Hideo Gosha and starring Shintaro Katsu as Okada Izo and Yukio Mishima as Tanaka Shinbei.
- The manga series Rurouni Kenshin is about a former hitokiri named Himura Kenshin, who is based loosely on Kawakami Gensai. Kenshin is also known as Hitokiri Battosai (人斬り抜刀斎), or "Sword-drawing Manslayer".
- Hideaki Sorachi's manga Gintama involves fictionalized versions of three of the four hitokiri (particularly Okada, Shinbei, and Kawakami), set in an alternate version of Bakumatsu-era Japan.
- The Hitokiri is a playable character in the video game For Honor, serving as a heavy hero of the Samurai faction and fighting with a two-handed axe.
- The 2014 video game Ryū ga Gotoku Ishin! features Okada Izo as one of the main antagonists. The 2023 remake version, Like a Dragon: Ishin!, also features Kawakami Gensai, Tanaka Shinbei and Nakamura Hanjiro as minor antagonists appearing in side missions.
- The 2025 Netflix television series Last Samurai Standing follows a former hitokiri named Shujiro Saga, also known as Hitokiri Kokushu. The fictional series is adapted from the novel of the same name by Shogo Imamura.
