= Tanaka Shinbei =

One of the Four Hitokiri of the Bakumatsu, elite samurai (1832–1863)

Tanaka Shinbei (田中 新兵衛; 1832 – 11 July 1863) was one of the Four Hitokiri of the Bakumatsu, elite samurai, active in Japan during the late Tokugawa shogunate in the 1860s.

== Biography ==
The Hitokiri Tanaka worked under the command of Takechi Hanpeita, the leader of the Tosa Kinnō-tō, who sought to overthrow the Tokugawa shogunate and restore the Emperor of Japan to power.

Hanpeita ordered Tanaka and the other hitokiri to enact "Heaven's punishment" (天誅, Tenchū) against supporters of the Shogunate and supporters of foreign access to Japan. A hitokiri from the Maenohama, Satsuma District, Tanaka came from a peasant background and previously a retainer for the Oribe branch of the Shimazu clan. After his first high-level assassination, he was elevated to samurai status despite the traditional samurai disdain towards peasants.

Tanaka was involved in the assassination of Ii Naosuke, the head of the Edo Council of Elders who was the head of administration for the Tokugawa shogunate in 1860. This assassination sparked years of violence in Japan especially in Kyoto where assassinations became commonplace. Of all the Hitokiris, Tanaka killed the most people. Besides Naosuke, his victims included politicians such as Shimada Sakon, Ukyo Omokuni and Homma Seiichiro. He was also suspected of murdering a young woman named Komichi. Because of this, Tanakaba was titled "ansatsu taicho" (captain of assassins). The Shinsengumi was formed in 1863 to suppress the hitokiri and Tosa loyalists and restore law and order.

Tanaka's sword was found at the scene of the assassination of senior official Anegakōji Kintomo near the Sarugatsuji. He was taken for questioning in Kyoto and asked to see the sword. He committed seppuku when he was given the sword.
