= Kaientai =

Japanese trading and shipping company and private navy

Flag of Kaientai

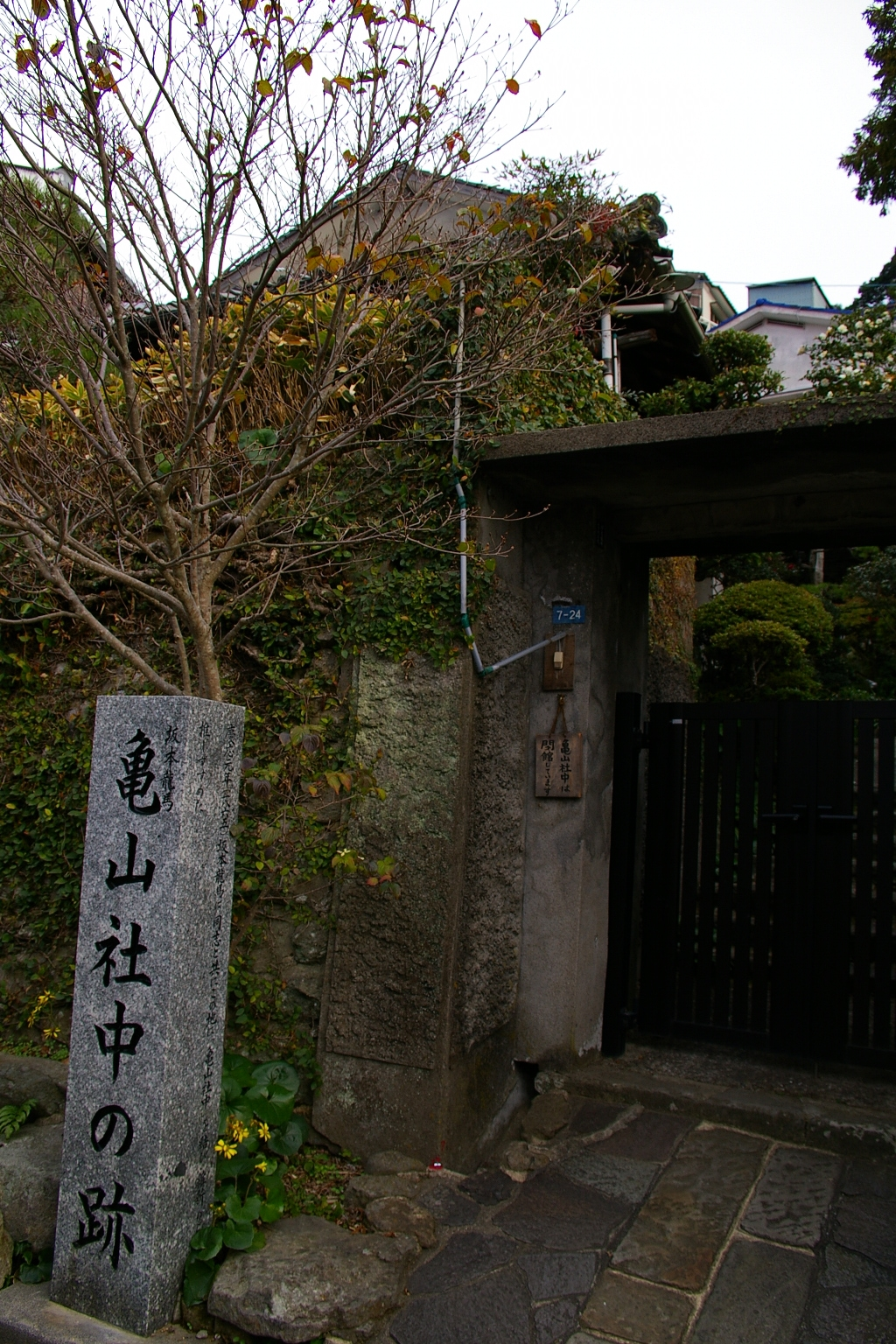
Kameyama Shachū Memorial Museum

The Kaientai (海援隊, Kaientai; "Maritime Support Force") was a trading and shipping company and private navy, considered to be the first corporation in modern Japan.

Kaientai, originally named Kameyama Shachū (亀山社中, "Kameyama Troupe"), was founded by Sakamoto Ryōma in Nagasaki in 1865 during the Bakumatsu, and it was initially funded by the Satsuma Domain and other groups and domains.

The logo of SoftBank Group is based on the idea of a "21st century Kaientai".

== Members of Kaientai ==
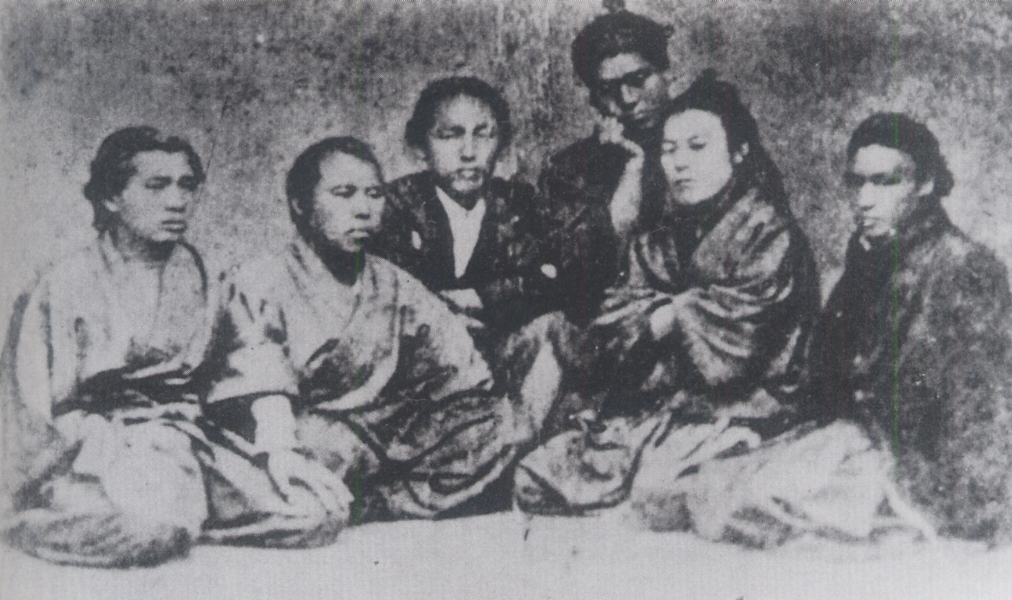
Kaientai members, around January 1867. From left: Nagaoka Kenkichi, Mizobuchi Hironojō, Sakamoto Ryōma, Yamamoto Kōdō, Sugano Kakubei, Shiramine Shunme.

=== Born in Tosa Domain ===
- Sakamoto Ryōma – Commander and founder
- Sasaki Takayuki – A second commanding officer of Kaientai after Ryōma's assassination. Would go on to become a privy councilor, cabinet minister and confidant of Emperor Meiji
- Nakaoka Shintarō
- Iwasaki Yatarou – Would go on to found Mitsubishi in 1870
- Sawamura Sōnojho
- Nagaoka Ken'ichi
- Ishida Eikichi
- Sakamoto Nao – Ryōma's adopted child
- Sugano Kakubei
- Jingū Umanosuke
- Nomura Koreaki

=== Born in Kishū Domain ===
- Mutsu Munemitsu – Minister of Foreign Affairs from 1892 – 1896

=== Born in Echizen Province ===
- Seki Yoshiomi
- Watanabe Gōhachi
- Odani Kōzō
