= Sakamoto Ryōma =

Japanese samurai and politician (1836–1867)

- 坂本 龍馬
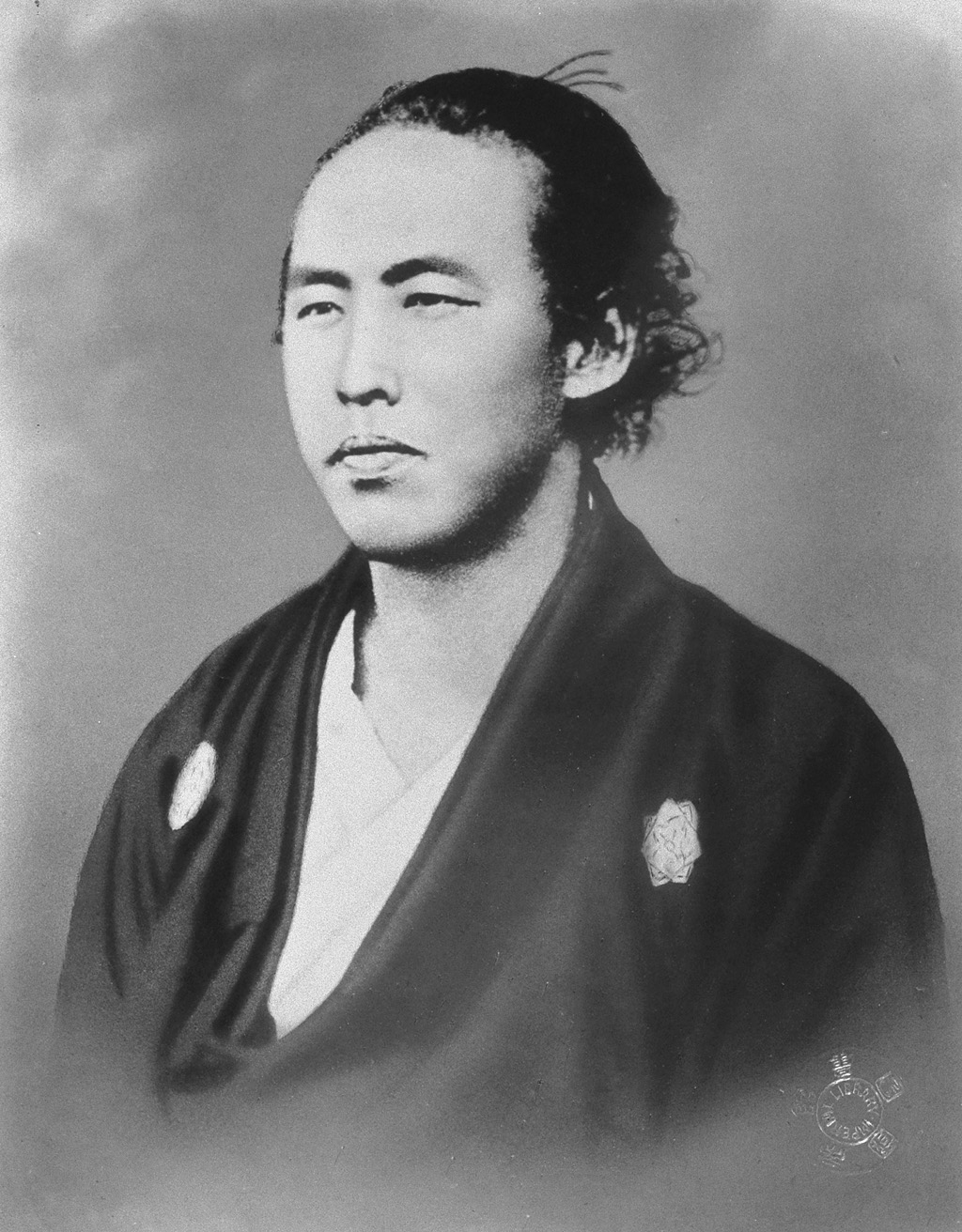
- Born: 3 January 1836; Kōchi, Tosa Province, Tokugawa Shogunate
- Died: 10 December 1867 (aged 31); Kyoto, Yamashiro Province, Tokugawa Shogunate
- Cause of death: Assassination
- Other names: Imina Naokage, Naonari
- Occupations: Samurai, politician
- Spouse: Narasaki Ryō
- Parent(s): Hachihei (Naotari), Sachi

Japanese name
- Kyūjitai: 坂本 龍馬
- Shinjitai: 坂本 竜馬

Sakamoto Ryōma (坂本 龍馬 or 坂本 竜馬; 3 January 1836 – 10 December 1867) was a Japanese samurai, a shishi and influential figure of the Bakumatsu, and establishment of the Empire of Japan in the late Edo period.

Sakamoto was a low-ranking samurai from the Tosa Domain on Shikoku and became an active opponent of the Tokugawa Shogunate after the end of Japan's sakoku isolationist policy. Under the alias Saitani Umetarō (才谷梅太郎), he worked against the Bakufu, the government of the Tokugawa shogunate, and was often hunted by their supporters and the Shinsengumi. Sakamoto advocated for democracy, Japanese nationalism, return of power to the Imperial Court, abolition of feudalism, and moderate modernization and industrialization of Japan. Sakamoto successfully negotiated the Satchō Alliance between the powerful rival Chōshū and Satsuma domains and united them against the Bakufu. Sakamoto was assassinated in December 1867 with his companion Nakaoka Shintarō, shortly before the Boshin War and the Meiji Restoration.

== Early life ==
Sakamoto Ryōma was born on 3 January 1836 in Kōchi in the han (domain) of Tosa, located in Tosa Province (present-day Kōchi Prefecture) on the island of Shikoku. By the Japanese calendar, Sakamoto was born on the 15th day of the 11th month, of the sixth year of Tenpō. The Sakamoto family held the rank of country samurai or gōshi, the lowest rank in the samurai hierarchy, which previous generations had purchased by acquiring enough wealth as sake brewers. Unlike other Japanese domains, Tosa had a strictly-enforced separation between the joshi (high-ranking samurai) and kashi (low-ranking samurai). The ranks were treated unequally and residential areas were segregated; even in Sakamoto Ryōma's generation (the third in the Sakamoto family), his family's samurai rank remained kashi.

At the age of twelve, Sakamoto was enrolled in a private school, but this was a brief episode in his life as he showed little scholarly inclination. Ryōma's older sister subsequently enrolled him in fencing classes of the Oguri-ryū when he was 14 after he was bullied at school. By the time Sakamoto reached adulthood, he was by all accounts a master swordsman. In 1853, Sakamoto was allowed by his clan to travel to Edo, the seat of the ruling Tokugawa shogunate and the de facto capital of Japan, to train and polish his skills as a swordsman. Sakamoto enrolled as a student at the famous Hokushin Ittō-ryū Hyōhō Chiba-Dōjō, which was led by its first Headmaster Chiba Sadakichi Masamichi at that time. Sakamoto received the scroll from the school that declared his mastery. Sakamoto became a shihan at the Chiba-Dōjō and taught Kenjutsu to the students together with Chiba Jūtarō Kazutane, in whom he found a close friend.

During his time at the Chiba Dojo, Sakamoto met Chiba Sana, Sadakichi's daughter. Within a few years, the two would become very close, with Ryoma requesting permission from Sadakichi to marry Sana. The two would become engaged. In 1858, Ryoma ended his training at the Chiba Dojo, returning to Tosa to further his studies. Despite their engagement, Sana and Ryoma would lose contact for several years.

== Politics ==
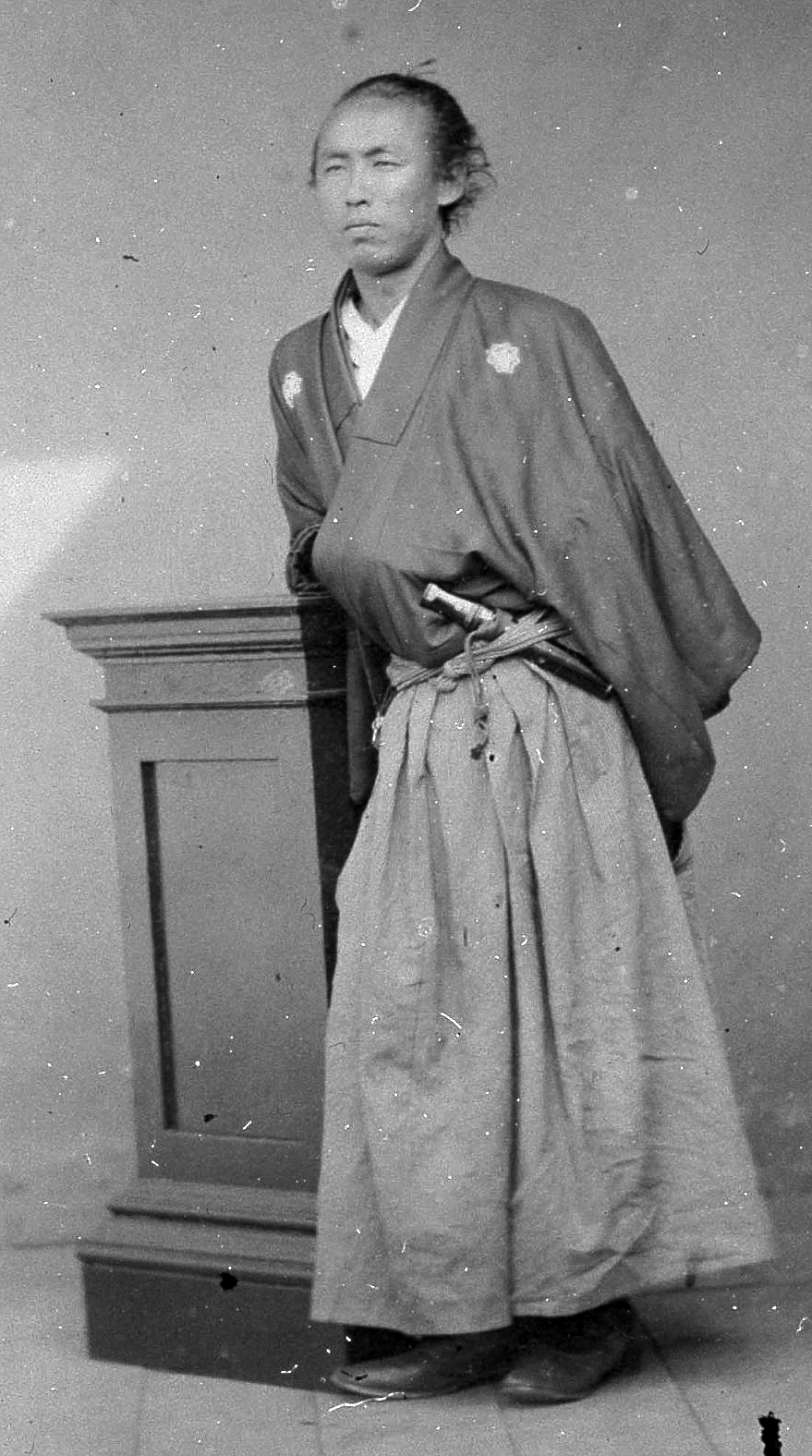
Sakamoto Ryōma standing (c. 1866 - 1867) and Ryōma's favored western footwear can be seen

=== Early Bakumatsu ===
In 1853, the Perry Expedition began while Sakamoto was studying and teaching in Edo, beginning the Bakumatsu period. Commodore Matthew C. Perry of the United States arrived in Japan with a fleet of ships to forcibly end the centuries-old sakoku policy of national isolationism. In March 1854, Perry pressured the Tokugawa to sign the Convention of Kanagawa, officially ending the sakoku policy but widely perceived in Japan as an "unequal treaty" and a sign of weakness. The prestige and legitimacy of the Shōgun, a de facto military ruler with a nominal appointment from the Emperor of Japan, was severely damaged to the public. The convention was signed by the rōjū Abe Masahiro, acting as regent for the young and sickly Shōgun Tokugawa Iesada, against the will of the Imperial Court in Kyoto, the de jure ruling authority. Anti-Tokugawa forces considered this evidence that the Shōgun could no longer fulfil the Emperor's will, and therefore no longer fit to rule for him. Sakamoto and many of the samurai class supported returning state power directly to the Imperial Court in Kyoto and began agitating for the overthrow of the Tokugawa shogunate.

In 1858, Sakamoto returned to Tosa after completing his studies, and became politically active in the local Sonnō jōi, the anti-Tokugawa movement arose in the aftermath of the Convention of Kanagawa.

In 1862, Sakamoto's friend Takechi Hanpeita (or Takechi Zuizan) organized the Tosa Loyalist Party "Kinnoto", a Sonnō jōi organization of about 2000 samurai (mostly from the lower rank) with the political slogan "Revere the Emperor, Expel the Barbarians" that insisted on the reform of the Tosa government. Yamauchi Toyoshige, the daimyō (lord) of the Tosa Domain, refused to recognize the group. In response, Tosa Kinnoto plotted to assassinate Yamauchi's governor, Yoshida Toyo, who was appointed as a reformer and modernizer. Yoshida was later assassinated by Tosa Kinnoto after Sakamoto had left Tosa. Sakamoto participated in the plot but did not advocate: he believed Tosa Kinnoto should do something for all of Japan, while Takechi demanded a revolution for only the Tosa clan. Sakamoto decided to separate from Takechi and leave Tosa without authorization. In those days, no one in Japan was permitted to leave their clan without permission under the penalty of death, known as dappan. One of Sakamoto's sisters committed suicide because she left without permission. Sakamoto later used the alias "Saitani Umetarō" (才谷 梅太郎) as he worked against the shōgun.

That same year, in 1862, Sakamoto returned to the Chiba Dojo, using it as a safe haven after running away from Tosa. While there, he reunited with Chiba Sana, and it is said that her father Sadakichi encouraged a full show of commitment to Sana from Sakamoto. With nothing else going on, Sakamoto gifted Chiba a sleeve with his family crest on it. Through this gesture, Sakamoto and Chiba were considered a married couple. Chiba would be informed of Sakamoto's death in 1868, still holding onto the belief that she was his wife, being unaware that Sakamoto had meanwhile married another woman.

Sakamoto is mentioned under the aforementioned alias in the diary of Ernest Satow for 30 September 1867: "Mr. Saedani had to be sat up for laughing at the questions put by us, evidently with the object of ridiculing us out of our case, but he got a flea in his lug and shut up making the most diabolical faces."

=== Late Bakumatsu ===
While a rōnin, Sakamoto decided to assassinate Katsu Kaishū, a high-ranking official in the Tokugawa shogunate and a supporter of both modernization and westernization. However, Katsu Kaishū persuaded Sakamoto of the necessity of a long-term plan to increase Japan's military strength in the face of Western influence which led to the Convention of Kanagawa. Instead of killing Katsu Kaishū, Sakamoto started working as his assistant and protégé.

In 1864, as the Tokugawa shogunate began taking a hard line against dissenters, Sakamoto fled to Kagoshima in Satsuma Domain, which was developing as a major centre for the anti-Tokugawa movement. In 1866, Sakamoto took part in the negotiation process of the secret Satchō Alliance between the Satsuma and Chōshū domains, which historically had been irreconcilable enemies. However, contrary to popular misconception, his position as a "neutral outsider" did not play an important role in the negotiations, as the critical role was in fact played by Komatsu Tatewaki. Sakamoto founded the private navy and trading company Kameyama Shachū in Nagasaki City with the help of the Satsuma, which later became kaientai or Ocean Support Fleet.

Chōshū's subsequent victory over the Tokugawa army in 1866 and the impending collapse of the Tokugawa shogunate made Sakamoto a valuable commodity to his former masters in Tosa, and recalled to Kōchi with honours. The Tosa Domain was anxious to obtain a negotiated settlement between the Shōgun and the Emperor, which would prevent the powerful Satchō Alliance from overthrowing the Tokugawa by force and thus emerging as a new dominant force in ruling Japan. Sakamoto again played a crucial role in the subsequent negotiations that led to the voluntary resignation of the Shogun Tokugawa Yoshinobu in 1867, thus bringing about the Meiji Restoration.

=== First assassination attempt ===
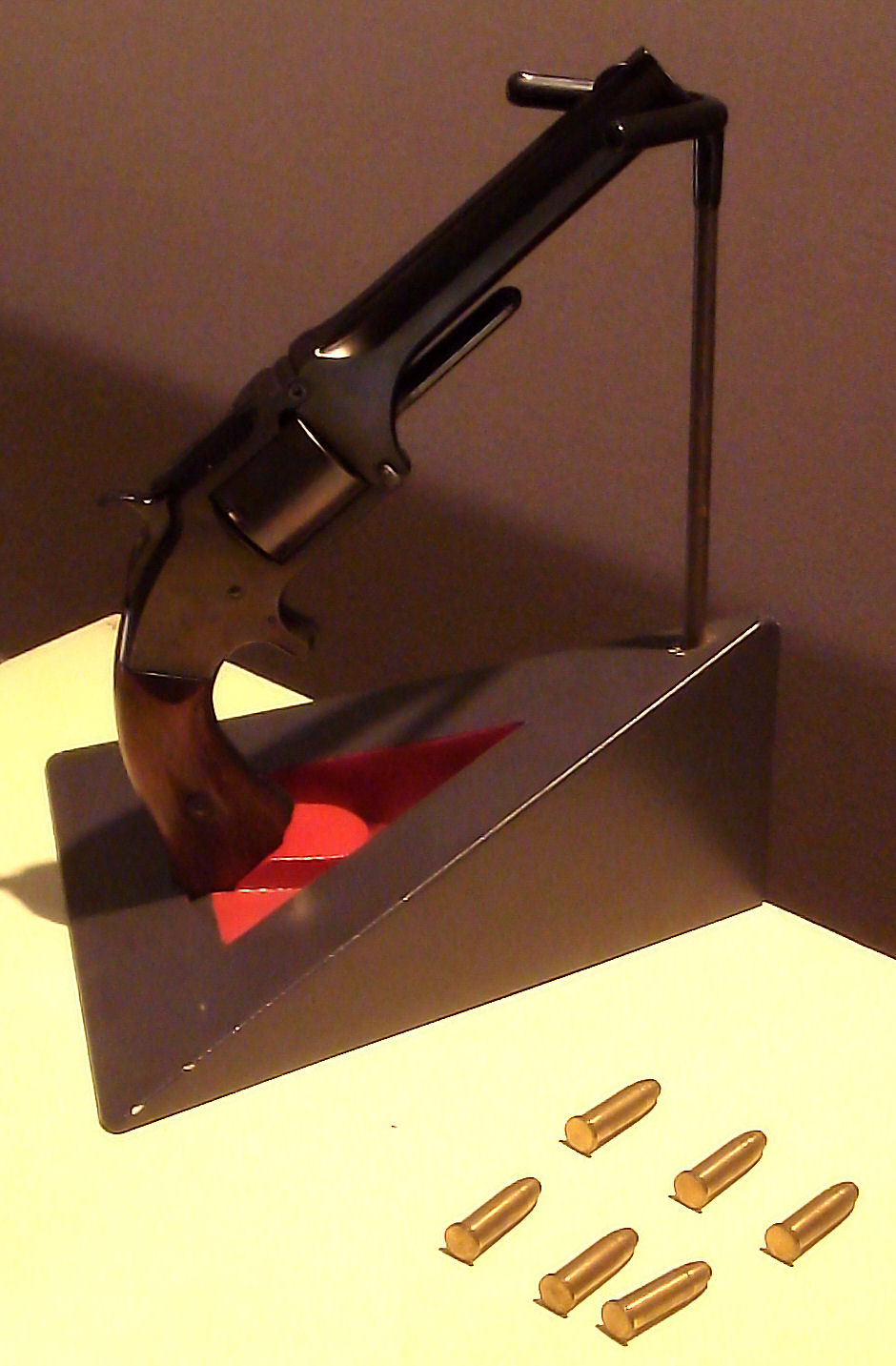
Ryōma's Nº 2 Army revolver

In March 1866, several agents of the shogunate attempted to assassinate Sakamoto Ryōma by ambushing him at the Teradaya ryokan in Kyoto. Two aspects of this have become famous. Firstly, he was alerted just in time by his future wife Narasaki Ryō (Oryō), who was surprised in her bath by the attackers and ran across a garden and up to the second floor of the inn to warn Sakamoto. Secondly, he used a Western firearm, a Smith and Wesson revolver, to fight off these attackers.

== Assassination ==
Sakamoto was assassinated at the Ōmiya Inn (Omiya) in Kyoto on 10 December 1867, not long before the Meiji Restoration took place, at the age of 31. At night, assassins gathered at the door of the inn, one approached and knocked, acting as an ordinary caller. The door was answered by Sakamoto's bodyguard and manservant Yamada Tōkichi (山田藤吉), a former sumo wrestler, who told the stranger he would see if Sakamoto was accepting callers at that hour of the evening. When the bodyguard turned his back, the visitor at the door drew his sword and fatally slashed his back. The team of assassins then rushed in past the dying bodyguard and up the stairs to the guests' rooms. Sakamoto and his associate Nakaoka Shintarō were resting and talking in one room. Hearing the scuffle on the first floor, Sakamoto opened the door to yell at his bodyguard, thinking he was wrestling with a friend. The assassins charged the room, some tearing through the paper doors, and a confused melée ensued as lamps were knocked over and the room went dark. By the end of the fight, both Sakamoto and Nakaoka lay badly wounded, and the assassins fled. Sakamoto died that night, regretting with his last words that his assassins caught him unprepared. Nakaoka succumbed to injuries two days later, never regaining enough consciousness to identify the assassins, but mentioned hearing Iyo dialect among the killers.

The night of the assassination was eventually called the Omiya Incident (近江屋事件). According to the traditional lunar calendar, Sakamoto was born on the 15th day of the 11th month, and killed on his birthday in 1867. Initial reports of Sakamoto's and Nakaoka's deaths accused members of the Shinsengumi, a special police force of swordsmen from the Bakufu (Tokugawa military government) based in Kyoto. Shinsengumi leader Kondō Isami was later executed on this charge. However, members of another pro-shōgun group, the Mimawarigumi, confessed to the murder in 1870. Although Mimawarigumi members Sasaki Tadasaburō (佐々木 只三郎) and Imai Nobuo carry the blame, the identity of the true assassin has never been proven. Okuda Matsugoro, who was known for working since his early adolescence as a spy for Kondō, was rumoured to have taken part in the assassination.

== Legacy ==
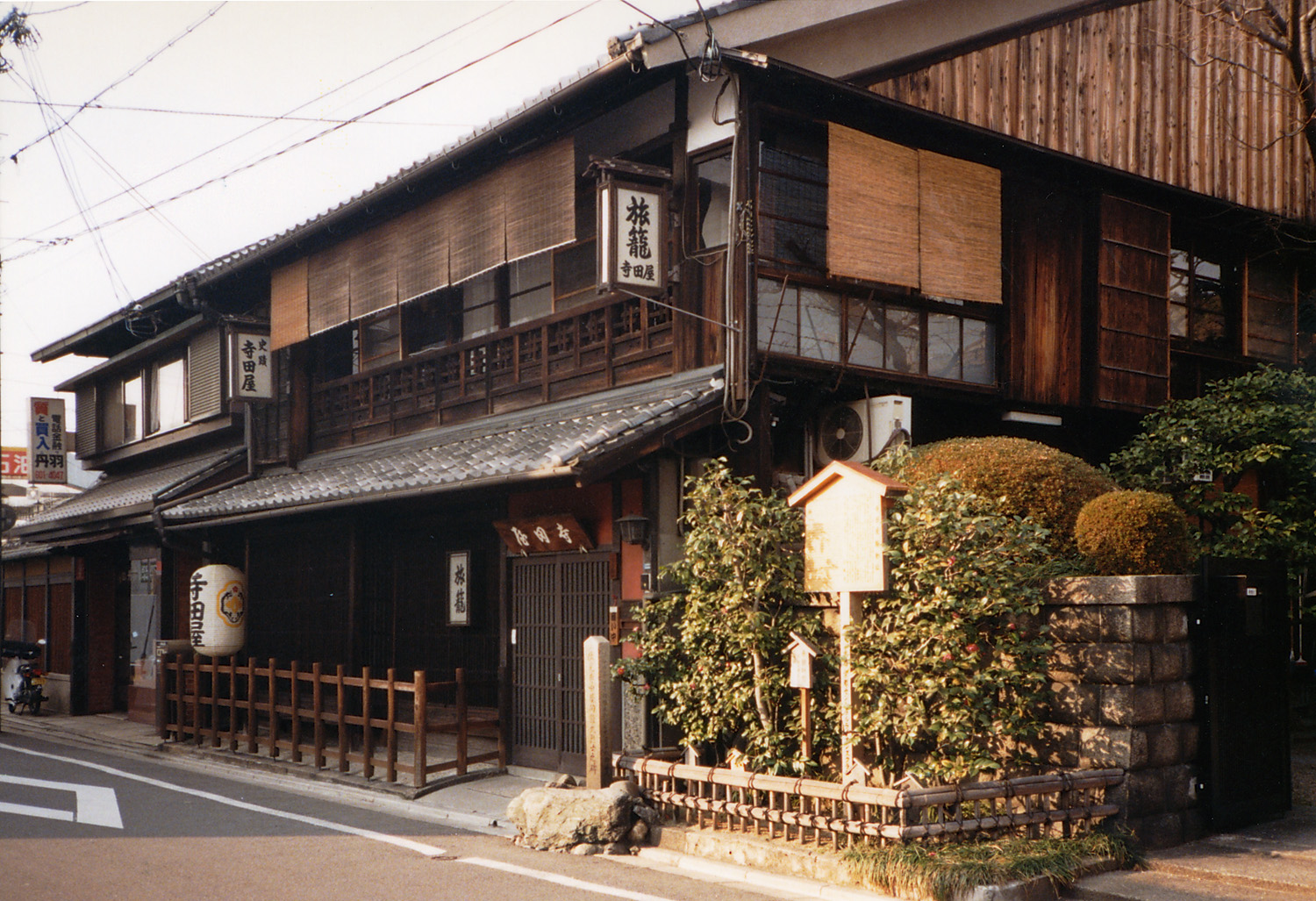
The Teradaya Inn in Kyoto, where Sakamoto was attacked in a failed assassination attempt, before being fatally injured at Omiya Inn.

Sakamoto was a visionary who dreamt of an independent Japan without feudalism or the caste system, inspired by the example of the United States where "all men are created equal". Sakamoto was an admirer of democratic principles and studied democratic governance, particularly the United States Congress and British Parliament, as a model for the governance of Japan after the Restoration. Sakamoto argued that after centuries of having little-to-no political power, the Imperial Court lacked the resources and wherewithal to run the country. Sakamoto wrote the "Eight Proposals While Shipboard" (『船中八策』) while discussing the future model of the Japanese government with Gotō Shōjirō on board a Tosa ship outside Nagasaki in 1867. Sakamoto outlined the need for a democratically elected bicameral legislature, the writing of a constitution, the formation of a national army and navy, and the regulation of the exchange rates of gold and silver. Sakamoto read about the Western world and realized that for Japan to compete with an industrially and technologically advanced outside world, the Japanese people needed to modernize. Sakamoto's proposals are thought to form the basis for the subsequent parliamentary system implemented in Japan after his death.

Sakamoto has also been seen as an intriguing mix of the traditional and modern, symbolized by his preference for samurai dress while favouring Western footwear.

Sakamoto has been heavily featured and romanticized in Japanese popular culture.

=== Honours in modern times ===
On 15 November 2003, the Kōchi Airport was renamed the Kōchi Ryōma Airport in his honour.

There is a Sakamoto Ryōma Memorial Museum (坂本龍馬記念館) south of Kōchi, with a large bronze statue of Sakamoto overlooking the sea. The city of Kōchi has a number of Sakamoto-themed attractions and locations, including the Sakamoto Ryōma Birthplace Memorial, and the Sakamoto Ryōma Hometown Museum, dedicated to showing what downtown Kōchi was like during his childhood, including relevant aspects that may have influenced his views. On 15 November 2009, the Hokkaidō Sakamoto Ryōma Memorial Museum was built in Hakodate, Hokkaido.

Asteroid 2835 Ryoma is named after him. Asteroid 5823 Oryo is named after his wife.

== In popular culture ==
=== Dramas, film and manga ===
An April 2010 Japan Times article stated "Ryōma has inspired at least seven television drama series, six novels, seven manga and five films." Actor Masaharu Fukuyama said that Ryoma's appeal stems from being "the kind of person onto whom anyone can project themselves", when describing his role as Ryoma in the NHK Taiga drama Ryōmaden.

Sakamoto Ryōma is a prominent character in the 2009–2011 TV series Jin, portrayed by actor Masaaki Uchino.

In the thirteenth episode of the anime series Arakawa Under the Bridge (2010), the character known as Last Samurai performs an impression of Ryōma. During his impression, he exclaims "my shoulder huuuuurts," to which the main character, Recruit, responds "that was an everyday Ryōma!"

He appears as a major supporting character in Rise of the Rōnin and as a secondary character in Inazuma Eleven Go Chrono Stones.

In the 2018 NHK Taiga drama Segodon, Ryoma is portrayed by Shun Oguri.

He is also the inspiration and basis for the character of Sakamoto Tatsuma in the manga and anime series Gintama created by Hideaki Sorachi.

Sakamoto Ryōma is a character in the "Shura no toki" manga.

Sakamoto Ryoma appeared in the 2024 drama "With You I Bloom: The Shinsengumi Youth Chronicle" based on the 1963 Shinsengumi manga by Osamu Tezuka. He was portrayed by Ryuji Sato.

Sakamoto Ryōma appears as a supporting character in Kamen Rider Ghost as one of the 15 heroic souls.

Sakamoto appears as the main character in The Untold Tale of the End of the Shogunate (Shin Kaishaku Bakumatsu-den), played by Tsuyoshi Muro.

=== Games ===
Sakamoto Ryōma is a playable character in the "Infiltrator" chapter of Live A Live (1994). He is held as a political prisoner by the warlord Ode Iou, but is later freed by the shinobi Oboromaru and joins him in stopping Ode's plans. He also appears as a playable character in the mobile game Fate/Grand Order, with additional appearances in other Fate media, like the manga Fate/KOHA-ACE and its revised adaptation, Fate/type Redline. Sakamoto Ryōma appears as the main protagonist of Like a Dragon: Ishin!, a spin-off of the Like a Dragon game series. He has the visual likeness and voice of Kazuma Kiryu. He also appears in Rise of the Rōnin.

== Gallery ==
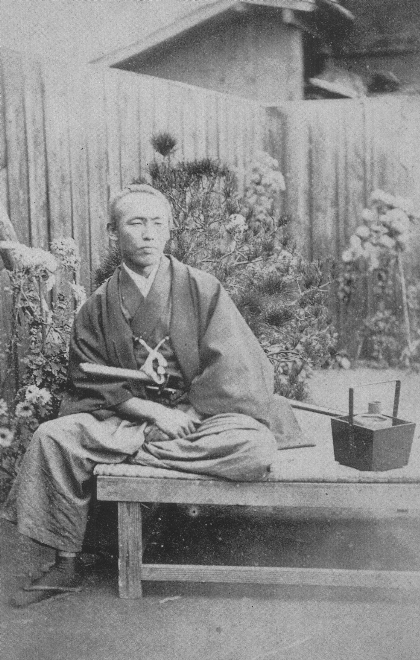
Sakamoto Ryōma in 1867

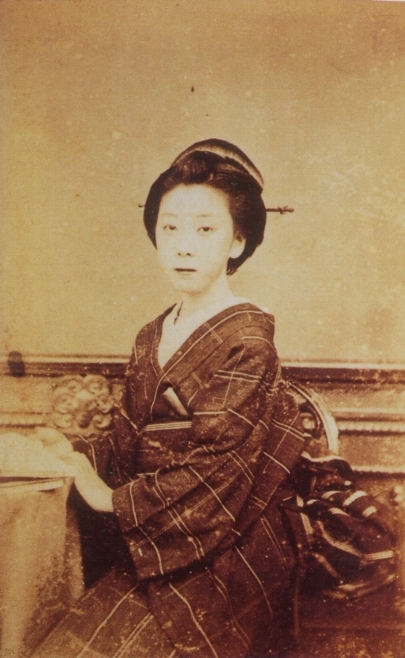
Narasaki Ryō (Oryō), born in Kyoto, Ryōma's wife

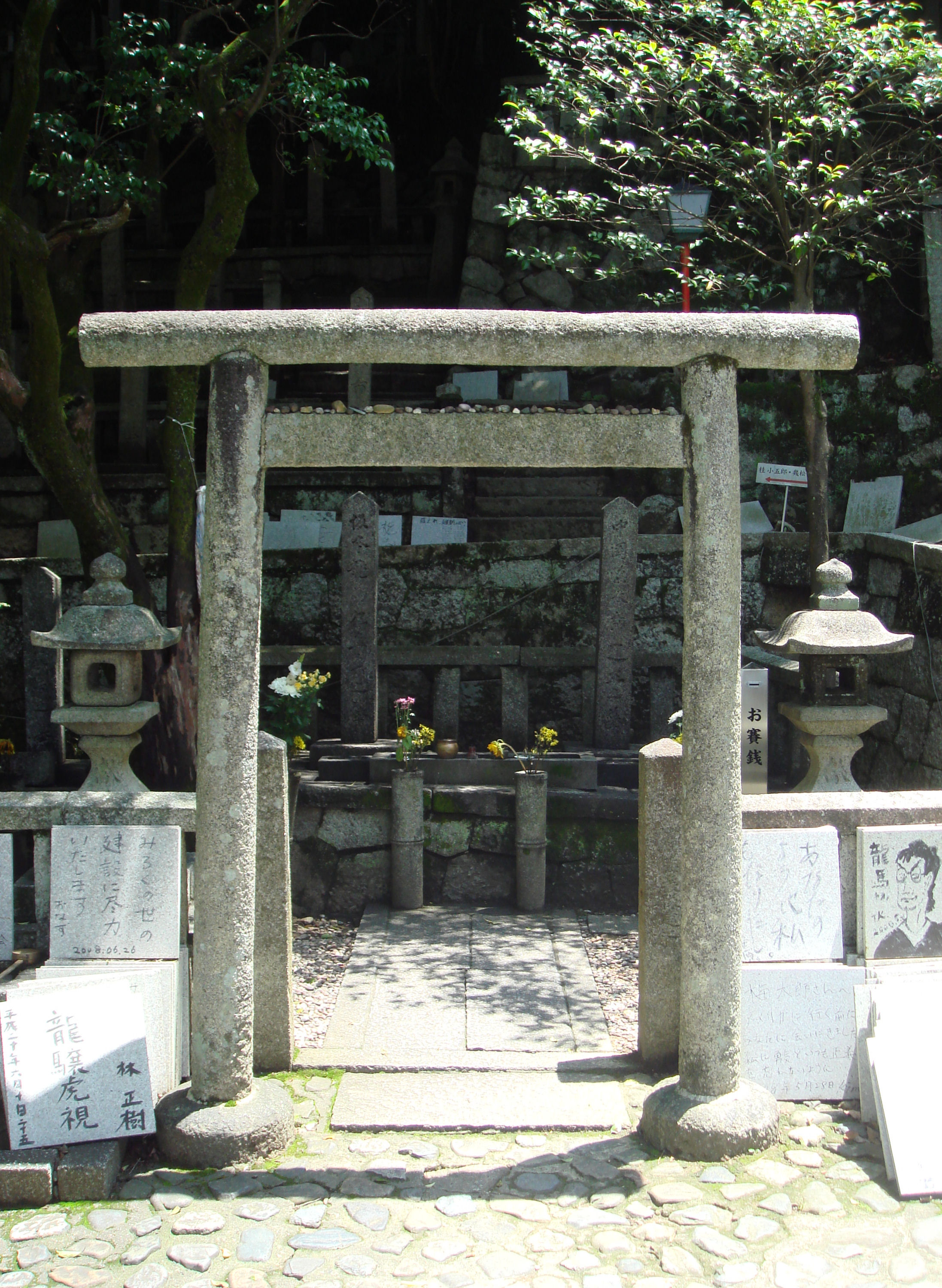
Tomb of Sakamoto Ryōma, in Ryōzen Gokoku Jinja (京都霊山護国神社), Kyoto.

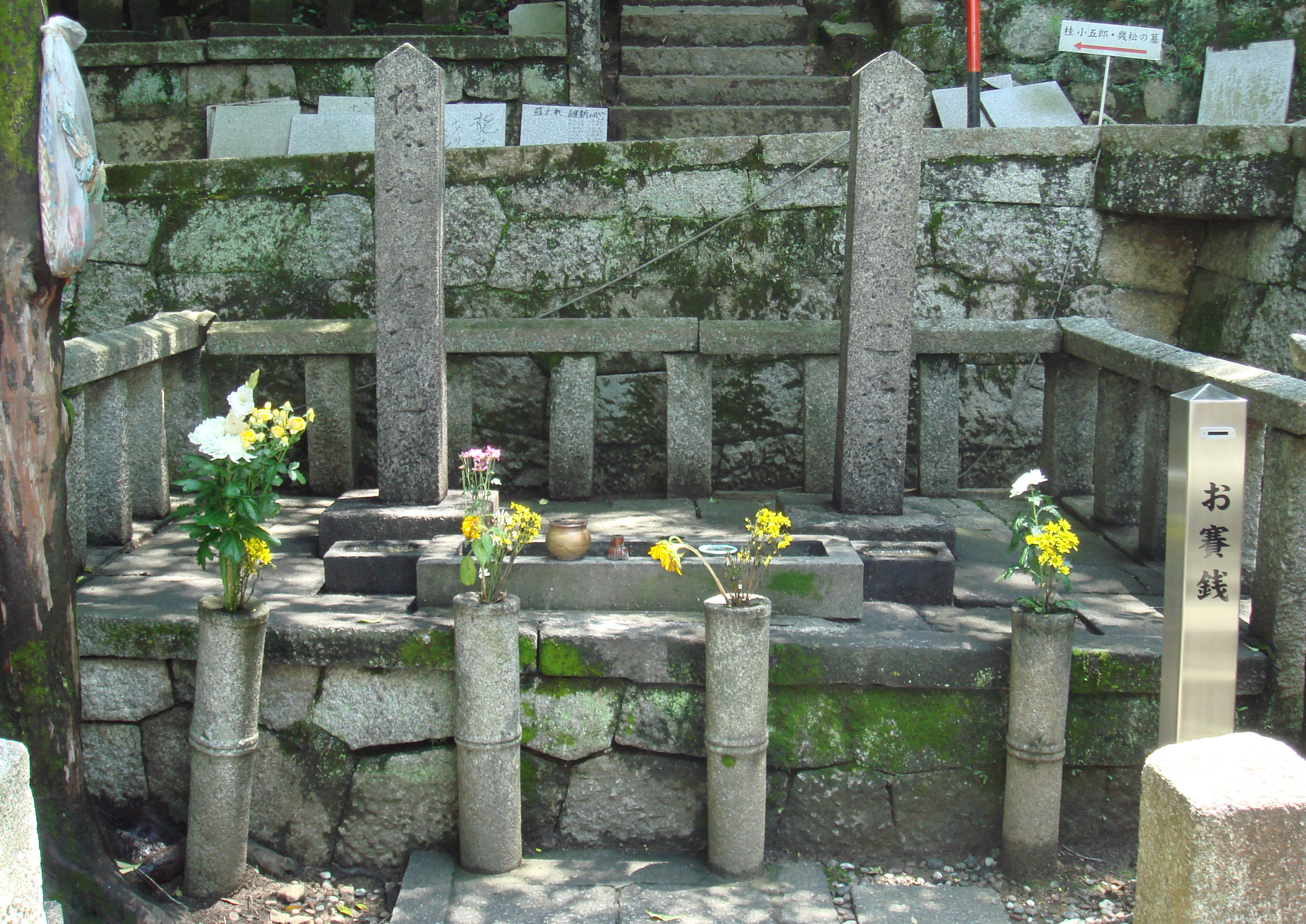
Tomb of Sakamoto Ryōma (detail)

Flag of Kaientai

Sakamoto family crest, Kikyōmon (Chinese bellflower)

== See also ==
- Nakahama Manjirō
- Shūsui Kōtoku
- List of unsolved murders
- Ryoma Ansatsu: 1974 film depicting Ryoma's last three days.
- The Top 100 Historical Persons in Japan

== General references ==
- Beasley, William G. (1972). The Meiji Restoration. Stanford: Stanford University Press. ISBN 9780804708159. OCLC 579232.
- Jansen, Marius B., and Gilbert Rozman, eds. (1986). Japan in Transition: From Tokugawa to Meiji. Princeton: Princeton University Press. ISBN 9780691054599. OCLC 12311985.
- Jansen, Marius B. (1961). Sakamoto Ryoma and the Meiji Restoration. Princeton: Princeton University Press. OCLC 413111.
