= Kyoto Mimawarigumi =

Japanese police force in Kyoto (1864–1868)

- 京都見廻組
- Active: 1864
- Disbanded: 1868
- Country: Kyoto, Japan
- Allegiance: Tokugawa bakufu
- Type: special police
- Role: To protect the Kyoto Imperial Palace
- Size: 200
- Engagements: Kinmon incident Battle of Toba-Fushimi; Battle of Hakodate

Commanders
- Notable commanders: Sasaki Tadasaburō; Imai Nobuo

The Kyoto Mimawarigumi (京都見廻組, Kyōto Mimawarigumi, lit. "Kyoto Patrolling Group") was a special police force created by the Tokugawa shogunate during the late Bakumatsu period to restore public order to Kyoto.

== History ==
In the unsettled period after the ending of the national isolation policy, the political situation in Japan became increasingly chaotic. Anti-government and anti-foreign rōnin congregated on the old imperial capital of Kyoto, and many of the daimyōs from the western feudal domains also established residences in Kyoto in an attempt to exert influence on the Imperial Court to pressure the shogunate towards the sonnō jōi movement ("Revere the Emperor, Expel the Barbarians") against the foreign powers.

=== Establishment ===
In 1864, the Kyoto Shugoshoku Matsudaira Katamori authorized the establishment of a militia of approximately 200 samurai formed into two companies under the command of Maita Hirotaka and Matsudaira Yasutada to restore public order to Kyoto. The two companies took their names from the courtesy titles of their commanders: the Sagami-no-kami-gumi and the Izumo-no-kami-gumi. The headquarters for the force was Nijō Castle in Kyoto.

The purpose of the Mimawarigumi was very similar to that of much more famous Shinsengumi.

The Mimawarigumi was composed entirely of higher-ranking samurai and sons of hatamoto-class retainers, all of whom were direct retainers to the Tokugawa Shogunate, predominantly through the Hoshina-Matsudaira clan of the Aizu domain, as opposed to the rōnin-based Shinsengumi. Indicative of this difference in status, the Mimawarigumi was assigned primarily to protect the Kyoto Imperial Palace and area around Nijo Castle, whereas the Shinsengumi was assigned to the Gion entertainment district and areas of the commoners and shopkeepers.

== Boshin War ==
In January 1868, the Mimawarigumi moved to Osaka and stationed at Honkakuji Temple. On January 8, 1868, the Mimawarigumi was renamed to Shin Yūgekitai (新遊撃隊), but later on January 19, only to rename back to Mimawarigumi.

In the Battle of Toba-Fushimi of the Boshin War, they engaged with the Satsuma Domain forces at the Toba Highway. However they were not equipped with firearms, struggled and retreated with other Shogunate forces. Later, They engaged in a battle near Hashimoto. However during the battle, Sasaki Tadasaburō, who was the leader of the unit, was fatally injured and died a few days later. The Mimawarigumi retreated back to Osaka to regroup with other Shogunate forces by January 31, 1868.

== Disbandment ==
However in the evening, Tokugawa Yoshinobu, accompanied by the daimyōs of Aizu and Kuwana, slipped away from Osaka Castle and headed to Edo. When the remnants of the forces learned that the Shōgun had abandoned them, they departed as well. The Mimawarigumi first moved to Kishū by foot, and sailed back to Edo, where they were tasked to defend the Edo Castle.

On April 10, 1868, the Mimawarigumi was renamed to Sogekitai (狙撃隊), but on the following day the Tokugawa surrendered to the new Meiji government. In June, the Meiji government decided to move the Tokugawa family to the Sunpu Castle in Suruga (present day Shizuoka). However, many of the Sogekitai members were not allowed to move to Suruga, and the unit was disbanded. Even after their unit's disbandment, Imai Nobuo and others would continue to fight alongside the Shogunate remnants of the forces against the Imperial Army. They eventually surrendered by the end of the Battle of Hakodate, the last battle of the Boshin War.

In 1870 Imai Nobuo, a former member of the Mimawarigumi confessed to a Military Judiciary Panel that he and other Mimawarigumi members, including Sasaki Tadasaburō had assassinated Sakamoto Ryōma in 1867, although the veracity of his confession remains a matter of historical debate.
