= Tosa Kinnō-tō =

19th-century Japanese political party

Tosa Kinnō-tō (土佐勤王党, Tosa Imperialism party) was a political shishi (organization) of Bakumatsu era Japan which was loyal to the ideals of the sonnō Jōi movement. It was formed by Takechi Hanpeita, influenced by the effects of the Perry Expedition. The Kinnō-tō killing of Yoshida Tōyō on 6 May 1862, led to sonnō jōi becoming the prevalent philosophy of Tosa Domain, but the party was destroyed when Takechi was imprisoned and forced to commit seppuku by the former daimyō of Tosa Domain Yamauchi Yōdō in 1865.

== History ==
=== Background ===
In February 1859, the daimyō of Tosa Domain Yamauchi Yōdō, was forced from office and placed under house arrest by the tairō Ii Naosuke for his efforts to establish Hitotsubashi Yoshinobu as successor to the shogunate. This outraged many of the Tosa samurai, who later applauded Ii's assassination in the Sakuradamon Incident of March 1860. The Sonnō jōi movement also spread quickly in Tosa, after many were alarmed by the arrival of the Perry Expedition in 1853 and what they perceived to be the weak response of the Tokugawa shogunate to this threat. In May 1860, Takechi went on a tour of Kyushu and western Japan with a number of his closest disciples, and returned with some of the works of kokugaku scholar Hirata Atsutane, which further reinforced his belief in the Sonnō jōi movement.

=== Formation ===
In April 1861, Takechi returned to Edo under the guise of practicing swordsmanship, but in reality to meet with like-minded samurai of various domains, including Katsura Kogōrō, Kusaka Genzui, and Takasugi Shinsaku of Chōshū, Kabayama Sanin from Satsuma and Iwama Kanpei from Mito. Takechi was particular interested in the teachings of Chōshū Yoshida Shōin as relayed to him by Kusaka. Increasingly concerned by the lack of action by their domain governments, the samurai of the three domains agreed to a three-point course of action: to force their domains to take action to expel the foreigners from Japan, to force their lords to enter Kyoto, and to force the Imperial Court to issue edicts against the unequal treaties with the foreign powers and Tokugawa shogunate. In August, Takechi secretly created the Tosa Kinnō-tō, recruiting 192 members, mostly from the lower-ranked samurai and some ronin formerly of Tosa Domain. Around this time, Tosa Domain was largely governed by Yoshida Tōyō, a trusted advisor to Yamauchi Yōdō. Yoshida was pursuing Yōdō's policy of supporting the opening of the country to foreign trade in order to gain western technology and weaponry which would help guard its independence, and also the Kōbu gattai policy of uniting the shogunate and imperial court. He dismissed Takechi's petitions as being childishly simplistic and unrealistic and rejected thoughts of uniting with other domains to oppose the shogunate.

=== Assassination of Yoshida Tōyō ===
While the situation did not improve for the Kinnō-tō, their saving grace was that Yoshida Tōyō's political base was also not solid. Although Tōyō originally had a weak political foundation, the former feudal lord Yamauchi Yōdō, who had been his backing, had fallen from power due to the Ansei Purge, and he was dissatisfied with his policy of reforming the domain system. It appeared that there were many conservatives among the powerful senior officers. The Kinnō-tō was originally in a position that was at odds with the conservatives, it was able to establish a cooperative relationship with the conservatives. Eventually, Takechi decided that his only course of action would be to assassinate Yoshida and to kidnap the young daimyō, Yamauchi Tomonori en route to Edo on his sankin kōtai. On April 8, 1862, three members of the Tosa Kinnō-tō murdered Tōyō before fleeing Tosa and Takechi took action to seize control of the Tosa government.

=== National affairs negotiations ===
Prior to this, Shimazu Hisamitsu of Satsuma had entered Kyoto but was soon expelled after the Teradaya incident by the forces of Chōshū, when then received an Imperial order mediate in national political affairs and to expel all foreigners from Japan. Takechi dispatched the Tosa Kinnō-tō to Kyoto to seek a similar privilege for Tosa, which was granted. The number of Tosa troops in Kyoto was increased to over 2000 and Yamauchi Yōdō established his residence there, while Tosa Kinnō-tō members (including "Man-Slayers" such as Okada Izō and Tanaka Shinbei) roamed Kyoto and its surroundings as a death squad, killing political opponents, such as supporters of the assassinated Yoshida Tōyō and members of the Shinsengumi and other Shogunal paramilitary forces in Kyoto. Takechi drafted petitions in the name of Yamauchi Tomonori to the emperor advocating a restoration of imperial rule, whereby the five provinces of the Kinai region should be placed under direct imperial control, a national military responsible to the emperor should be created, and that future ordinances should be issued from the throne and not the shogun, and that the foreigners should be immediately expelled. He was sent to Edo as an official envoy of the Emperor, and was received in audience by Shogun Tokugawa Iemochi, which gave a vague and noncommittal response. He returned to Kyoto to receive unprecedented honors; however, he also received the increasing displeasure of Yamauchi Yōdō, who soon took action to suppress the Tosa Kinnō-tō and to prohibit their political negotiations with the Court and other domains. Takechi was dismissed and ordered back to Tosa, but he continued to work towards creating the Satchō Alliance.

=== Arrests and end ===
Yamauchi Yōdō meanwhile had been searching for the assassins of Yoshida Tōyō and arrested three members of the Tosa Kinnō-tō, who confessed to the crime under interrogation. Takechi refused suggestions that he should flee Tosa, and continued to offer unsolicited political advice to Yamauchi Yōdō. In September, Takechi and other Tosa Kinnō-tō members were arrested, and although lower-ranking members were tortured, Takechi himself was initially not harmed and continued to deny involvement in Yoshida Tōyō's murder. In September the following year, an uprising of samurai sympathetic to Takechi was suppressed and the roundup of Tosa Kinnō-tō members and supporters continued. On July 3, 1865, four leaders of the Tosa Kinnō-tō were sentenced to death by decapitation, and Takechi was ordered to commit seppuku by Yamauchi Yōdō. He had been imprisoned for 1 year 8 months and 20 days.

With Takechi's death, the Tosa Kinnō-tō was destroyed. Some survivors, including Nakaoka Shintarō, left the domain, becoming ronin and continued to engage in anti-shogunate activities. Later, through Nakaoka's mediation, Tosa eventually joined the anti-shogunate alliance, and Gotō Shōjirō, a domain official who had led the suppression of the Tosa Kinnō-tō eventually became a political advisor and working with Sakamoto Ryoma towards restoration of Imperial rule. Takechi received posthumous pardons in 1877, and he was posthumous promoted to Senior Fourth Court rank by the Imperial Court in 1891.

== Bibliography ==
- Isomura, Yukio; Sakai, Hideya (2012). (国指定史跡事典) National Historic Site Encyclopedia. 学生社. ISBN 978-4311750403.(in Japanese)
- Jansen, Marius B. Sakamoto Ryoma and the Meiji Restoration. Princeton: Princeton UP, 1961. Print. ISBN 978-0231101738
