= Yoshida Tōyō =

Japanese samurai (1816–1862)

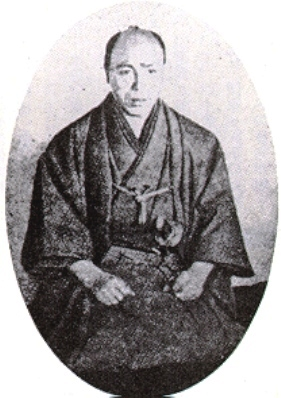
Yoshida Toyo

Yoshida Tōyō (吉田東洋; 1816 – 6 May 1862) was a Japanese samurai and Karō from Tosa Domain. Gotō Shōjirō was his nephew-in-law.

In 1853, Toyo was appointed by the head of Tosa domain Yamanouchi Toyoshige to reform and modernize the domain.

He was assassinated on 6 May 1862 by three members of Tosa Kinnō-tō, a local political reform party.
