= Narahara =

Narahara may refer to:

- Narahara (surname), a Japanese surname
- Mount Narahara, a mountain of Okinawa Prefecture, Japan
- Narahara Station, a railway station in Mimasaka, Okayama Prefecture, Japan
- 15716 Narahara, a main-belt asteroid
