= Takayama Hikokurō =

Samurai and historian

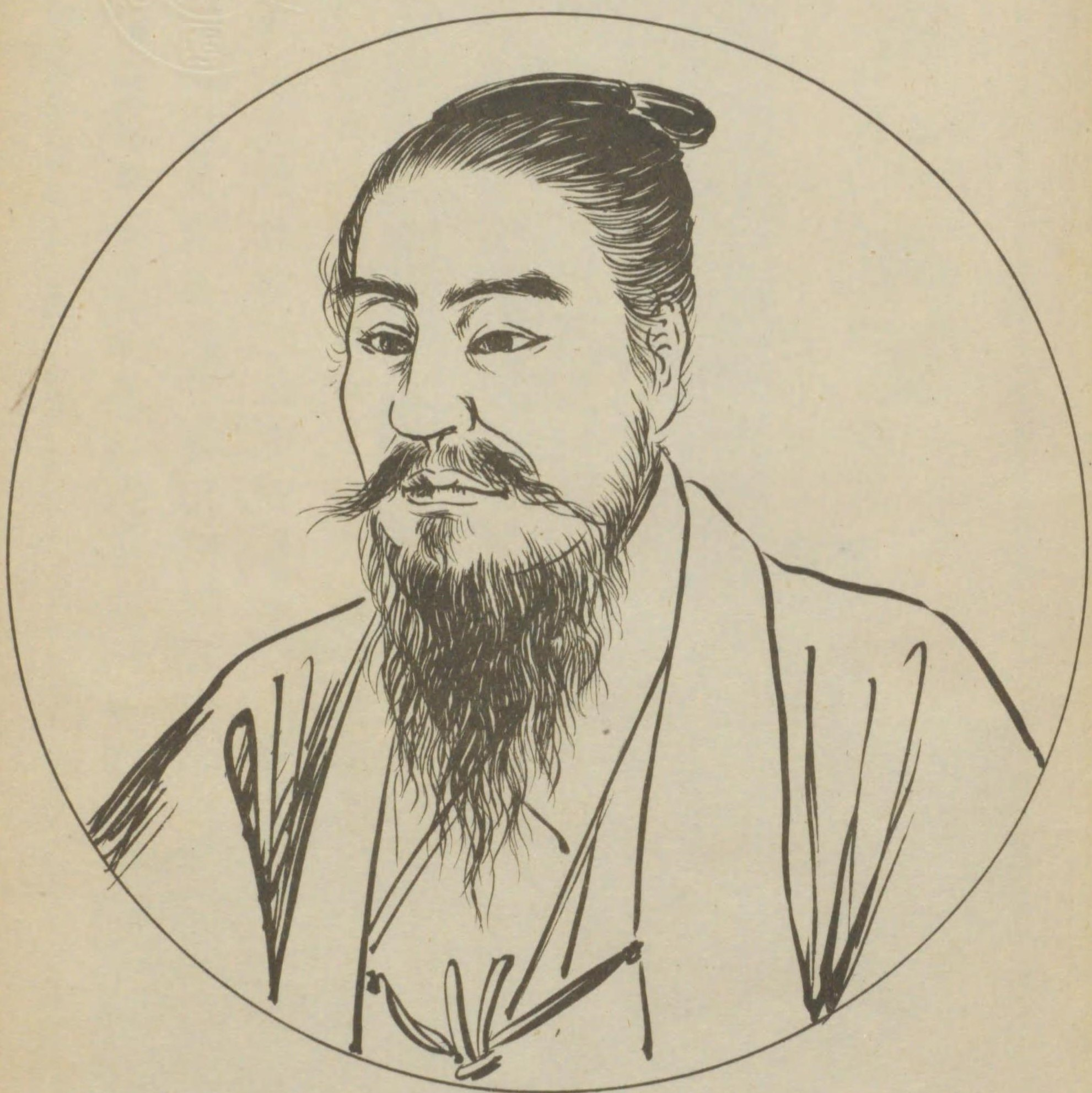
- A portrait of Hikokuro Takayama by Sui Seki, a chief retainer of the Isesaki clan. From Juri Arai's Takayama Hoshitsushi
- Born: June 15, 1747; Nitta District, Kōzuke (now Ōta, Gunma), Japan
- Died: August 4, 1793 (aged 46); Kurume, Fukuoka, Japan

Takayama Hikokurō (高山 彦九郎) (15 June 1747 – 4 August 1793) was a Japanese samurai and historian, and one of the early proponents of the sonnō jōi movement which became highly influential during the Bakumatsu period in the events leading to them Meiji restoration. He was later known as one of "Three Excelling Men of the Kansei Period" (Kansei no san-kijin 寛政の三奇人). His Dharma name was Shōin Ihaku Koji (松陰以白居士).

== Biography ==
Takayama was the son of Takayama Ryōzaemon Masakiyo, a local samurai in Hosoya Village, Kōzuke Province in what is now part of the city of Ōta, Gunma. He claimed descent from Takayama Shigehide, one of the 16 companions of Nitta Yoshisada, the famed imperial loyalist during the wars of the Nanboku-chō period. After reading the medieval chronicle Taiheiki at the age of 16 he became a Buddhist priest and at the age of 18 left home (leaving behind a suicide note) and travelled around the country spreading his theories on the supremacy of the Imperial house and illegitimacy of the Tokugawa shogunate. He studied Japanese Neo-Confucianism under Hosoi Heishu in Edo. During his travels, he cultivated a wide circle of acquaintances with whom he regularly corresponded, including Hayashi Shihei, Uesugi Harunori, Hirose Tansō and others. Thwarted in his efforts to reach Ezo due to high security by the shogunate, he turned to Kyoto instead. He resided for a time at the house of the kuge Iwakura Tomokazu, presented a memorial to Emperor Kōkaku and wrote numerous patriotic poems.

He was outraged by the treatment of Dainagon Nakayama Naruchika by the shogunate over an issue pertaining to the regnal name for Emperor Kōkaku and publicly criticized the rōjū Matsudaira Sadanobu. Forced to leave Kyoto, he travelled to Kyushu in hopes of enlisting Satsuma Domain in his efforts against the shogunate, but was rebuffed. After traveling to various parts of Kyushu, he stopped at the home of a friend, the doctor Mori Kazen, in Kurume, Fukuoka and committed seppuku.

Takayama left a diary which later influenced Yoshida Shōin and the proponents of the Meiji restoration, and following the establishment of the Meiji government, he was upheld, along with Kusunoki Masashige and Ninomiya Sontoku as examples of imperial loyalists in pre-war patriotic education.

He is best known, however, for a large bronze statue in front of Sanjō Ōhashi in Kyoto, depicting Takayama bowing in the direction of the Kyoto Imperial Palace. The statue was erected in 1924 to celebrate the accession of emperor Hirohito with an inscription by Admiral Tōgō Heihachirō. It was melted down in 1944 for metal for use in the war effort, and replaced with a stone stele with writing by Tokutomi Sohō. The statue was finally restored in 1961.

== Takayama Hikokurō former residence and hair mound ==
The location of the house where Takayama was born in Ōta, Gunma was proclaimed a National Historic Site in 1931, together with a mound in the nearby family cemetery containing his severed topknot of hair, which was brought back to his family after his suicide. The house has long been demolished and the site has reverted to farmland, but some traces of the well and hedges remain. The location is about a 10-minute walk from Hosoya Station on the Tōbu Railway Isesaki Line. The Takayama Hikokurō Memorial Museum is located a short distance away.

== Takayama Hikokurō grave ==
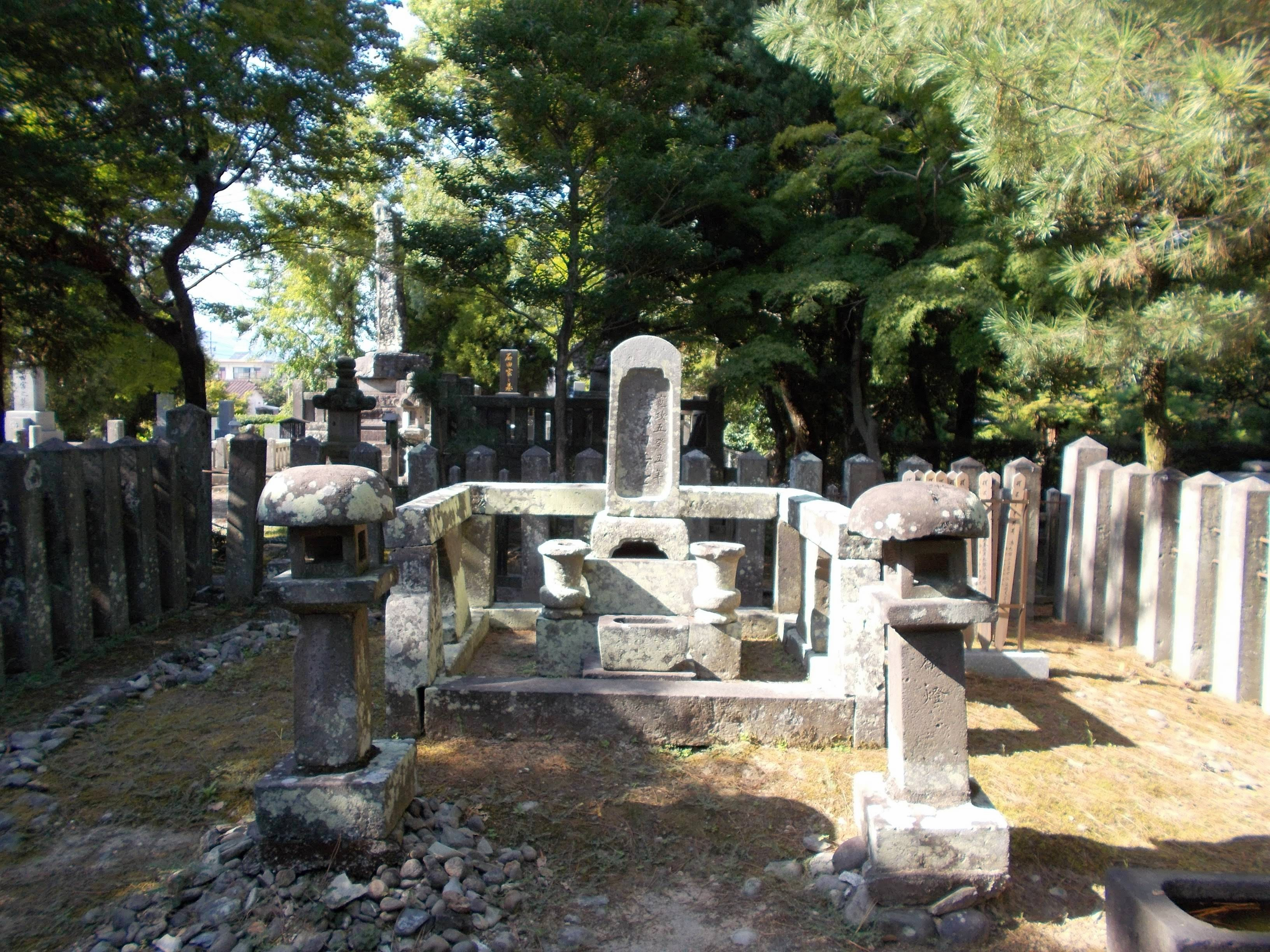
Grave of Takayama Hikokurō

Takayama Hikokurō 's grave is located in within the precincts of Henshō-in, a Shingon sect temple in the Teramachi neighbourhood near the center of Kurume. The tombstone is about 75-cm high, and is inscribed with his s Dharma name of "Shōin Ihaku Koji". This grave was designated as a National Historic Site in 1942. It is located approximately 10 minutes on foot from Nishitetsu Kurume Station on the Nishitetsu Tenjin Ōmuta Line.

== See also ==
- Hayashi Shihei
