= Gamō Kunpei =

Japanese author

Gamō Kumpei
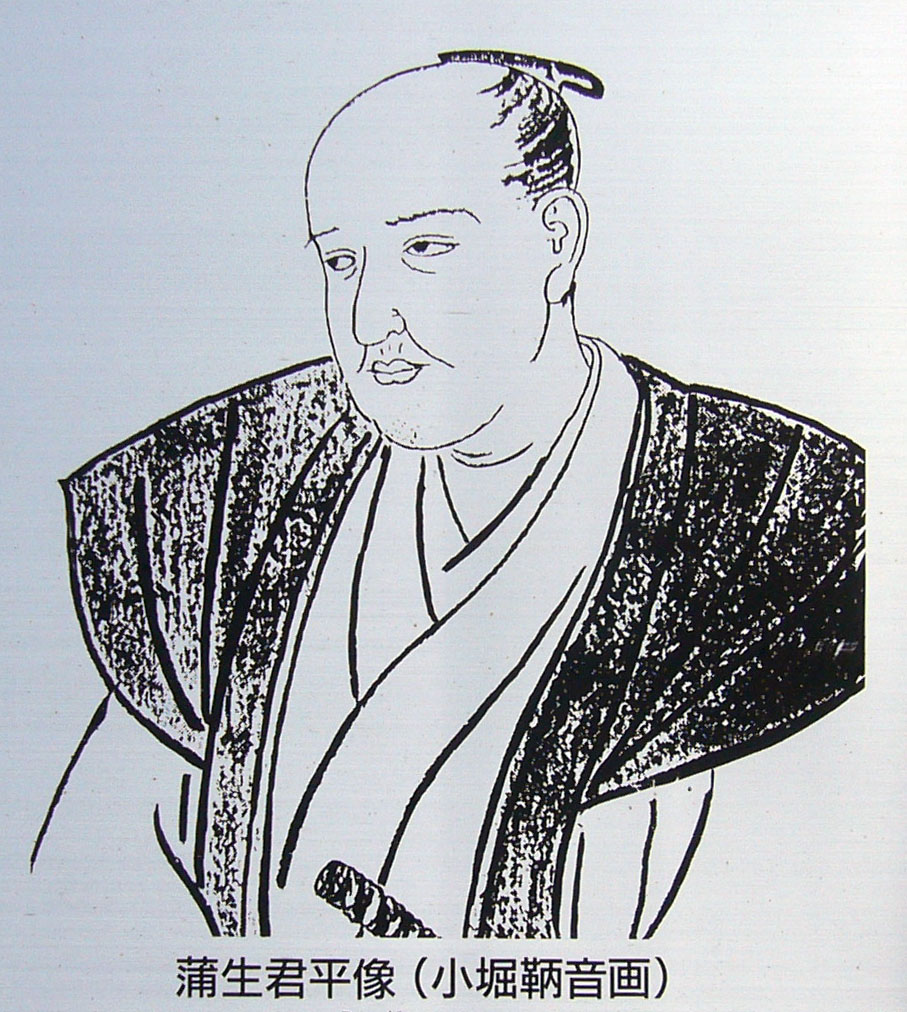
- Gamō Kumpei
- Born: 1768; Utsunomiya, Shimotsuke Province, Japan
- Died: July 13, 1813 (aged 44–45); Edo, Japan

Gamō Kumpei (蒲生君平; 1768 - July 31, 1813) was a Japanese writer, Confucian scholar and early member of the kokugaku movement which would lead to the events of the Bakumatsu period and Meiji restoration in Japanese history.

== Biography ==
Gamō Kumpei was born in Utsunomiya as the son of an oil merchant. His name was initially Fukuda Hidezane, but when he heard that his family was derived from the famous warlord Gamō Ujisato, he changed his name to Gamō Kumpei. A precocious child, he learned reading, Japanese calligraphy and the Four Books and Five Classics under the tutelage of a priest at a local Buddhist temple. In 1782, at the age of 14, he was sent to Edo to study at the Shoheizaka Gakumonsho Academy, where he studied national history and the classics, and where read the medieval chronicle Taiheiki and was inspired by the loyalty of Kusunoki Masashige and Nitta Yoshisada to Emperor Go-Daigo in the Muromachi period. During his studies he came together with Fujita Yūkoku (藤田 幽谷; 1774–1826) and other representatives of the Mito school. This increased his interest in history, and he began to deal with the "true relationship between sovereign and subject" (大義 名分 Taigi meibun) from the teaching of Confucius. He soon found that the emperor's authority was not being sufficiently appreciated. He also travelled extensively to meet with other scholars, including Hayashi Shihei in Sendai Domain in 1790, developing a reputation of eccentricity and for a total lack of consideration for his personal appearance. Although Hayashi Shihei knew of Gamō by reputation, when they first met, he mistook him for a beggar due to his disheveled appearance.

In 1795, on hearing of the appearance of Russian warships off of Japan's northern coasts, he became concerned with the issue of coastal defense, and travelled extensively in the Tōhoku region of Japan. He visited Kyoto they following year to research the imperial tombs and then returned to Mito to contribute his research to Tokugawa Mitsukuni's Dai Nihonshi encyclopedia. He continued his travels through the year 1800 to visit all of the imperial tombs in the Kinai area, and even visited the tomb of Emperor Juntoku on the island of Sado. In 1801, he set up a private school called Shusei-an near Kisshō-ji in Komagome, Edo, where he worked on his book entitled "Notes on the Imperial Tombs" (山陵 志 Sanryō-shi). In his book, he describes keyhole-shaped kofun as zenpo-koen-fun (前方後円), a term which is still used to this day. In 1807, he wrote "Fujutsu", which advocated improvements in the coastal defense of northern Japan, and presented it to the Shogunate. In January 1808, he published "Sanryoshi", which was viewed by Emperor Kokaku. These activities, which bordered on politics, drew the wrath of the Machi-bugyō, and Gamō was repeatedly investigated for sedition. He relocated to Kanda in Edo, where he continued to write numerous monographs and treatises recommending reforms to the government. In 1813, he fell ill and died of dysentery at the age of 46. His grave is at the temple of Rinkō-ji in Taitō, Tokyo. It was designated a National Historic Site in 1942.

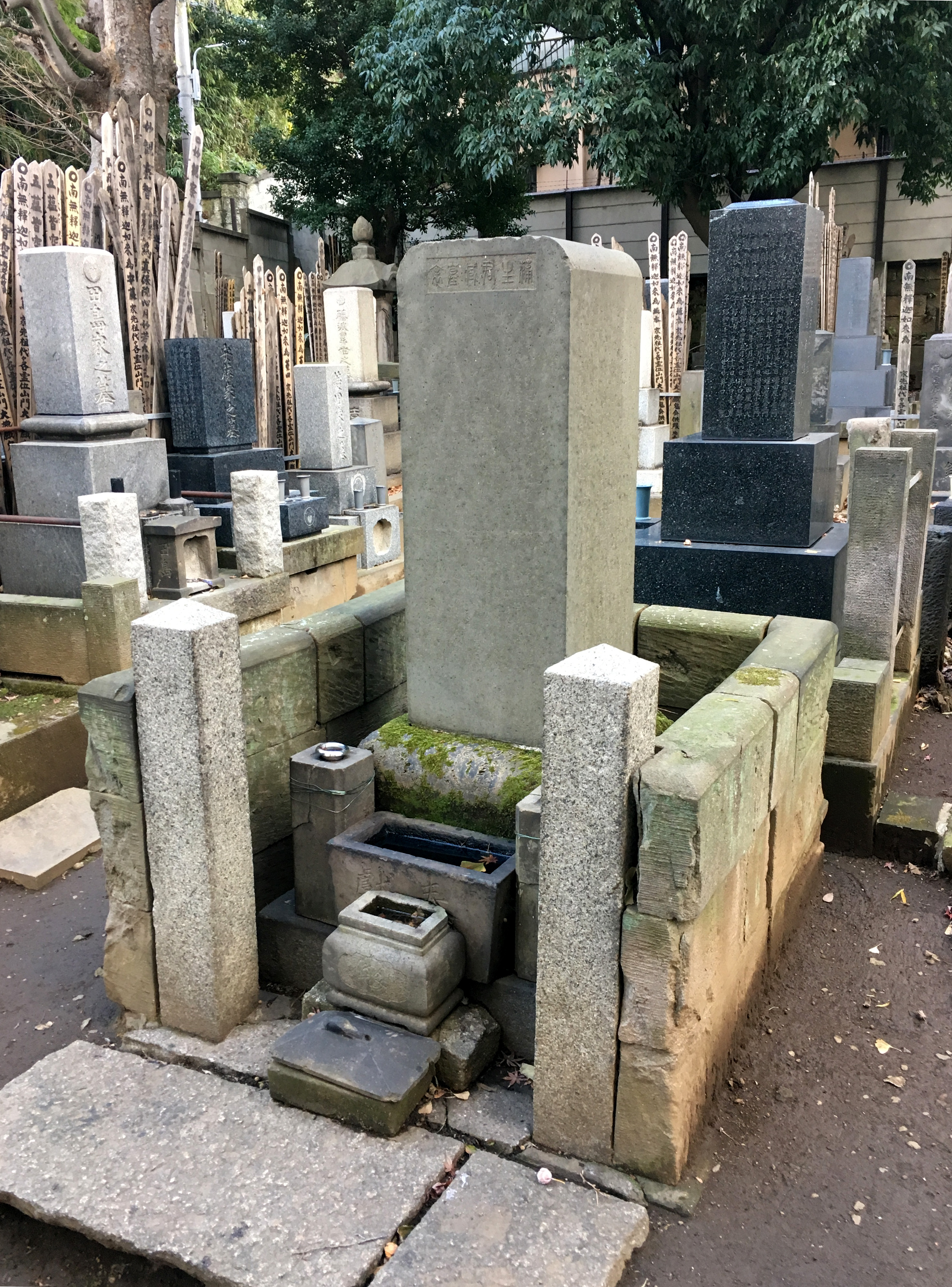
Tomb of Gamo Kunpei

Gamō was one of the few writers who dared to represent the imperial cause publicly under the Tokugawa government. He was thus an important forerunner of the restorative movement that eventually led to the Meiji Restoration. Together with Takayama Hikokurō and Hayashi Shihei, Gamō is known as one of the "Three Excelling Men of the Kansei Period" (Kansei no san-kijin 寛政の三奇人).
