= Mount Byōbu (Okinawa) =

Mountain in Okinawa, Japan

- 屏風岳
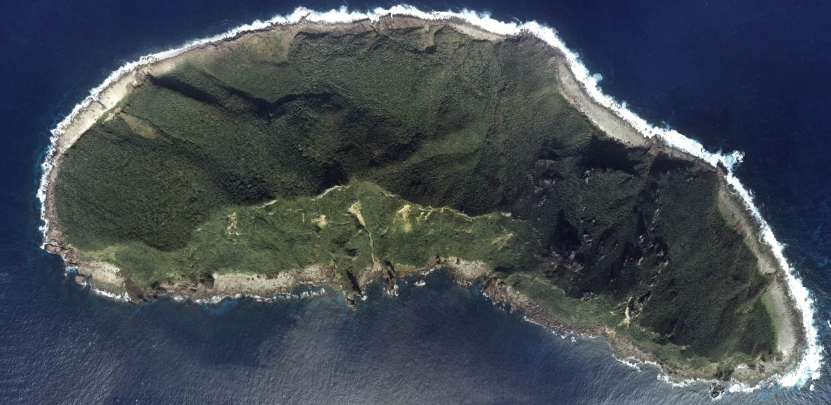
- Mount Byōbu on Uotsuri-jima

Highest point
- Elevation: 320 m (1,050 ft)
- Listing: List of mountains in Japan
- Coordinates: 25°44′34.5″N 123°28′59.5″E

Geography
- Location within Japan
- Location: Ishigaki, Okinawa Prefecture, Japan

Mount Byōbu (屏風岳, Byōbu-dake) is a mountain located on Uotsuri-jima of Senkaku Islands in Ishigaki, Okinawa, Japan. It is the second highest point of the island, after Mount Narahara.

== See also ==
- Mount Byōbu
