= Takeshirō =

- Gender: Male

Origin
- Origin: Japanese
- Meaning: Different meanings depending on the kanji used

Takeshirō, Takeshiro or Takeshirou (written: 孟郎 or 武四郎) is a masculine Japanese given name. Notable people with the name include:

- Takeshirō Kanokogi (鹿子木 孟郎; 1874–1941), Japanese painter
- Matsuura Takeshirō (松浦 武四郎; 1818–1888), Japanese explorer, cartographer, writer, painter, priest and antiquarian
- Nagayama Takeshirō (永山 武四郎; 1837–1904), Japanese government minister
