= Iwamura Michitoshi =

Japanese politician

Baron Iwamura Michitoshi
- 岩村 通俊
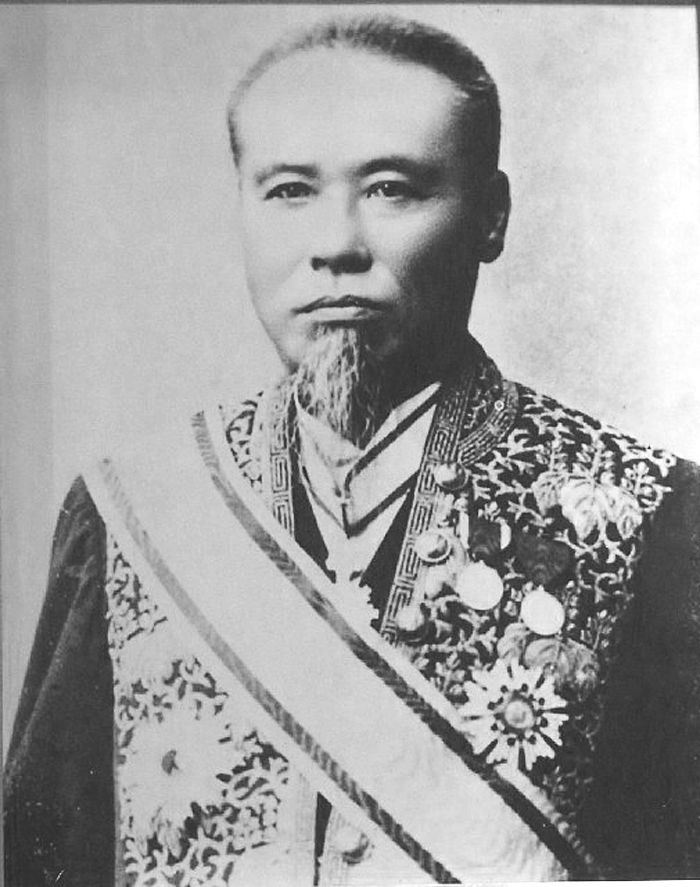

Minister of Agriculture and Commerce
- In office 23 December 1889 – 17 May 1890
- Prime Minister: Yamagata Aritomo
- Preceded by: Inoue Kaoru
- Succeeded by: Mutsu Munemitsu

Member of the House of Peers
- In office 29 September 1890 – 20 February 1915 Nominated by the Emperor

Member of the Genrōin
- In office 14 June 1888 – 20 October 1890
- In office 28 June 1880 – 21 October 1881

President of the Board of Audit
- In office 21 October 1881 – 7 May 1884
- Preceded by: Yamaguchi Masuka
- Succeeded by: Noboru Watanabe
Gubernatorial offices
Director-General of the Hokkaidō Agency
In office 26 January 1886 – 15 June 1888
Monarch	Meiji
Preceded by	Tokito Tamemoto (as Governor of Hakodate); Chōsho Hirotake (as Governor of Sapporo); Sadamoto Yuchi (as Governor of Nemuro)
Succeeded by	Nagayama Takeshirō
Governor of Okinawa Prefecture
In office 22 April 1883 – 21 December 1883
Monarch	Meiji
Preceded by	Uesugi Mochinori
Succeeded by	Nishimura Sutezō
Governor of Kagoshima Prefecture
In office 21 March 1877 – 28 June 1880
Monarch	Meiji
Preceded by	Ōyama Tsunayoshi
Succeeded by	Chiaki Watanabe
Governor of Saga Prefecture
In office 22 July 1873 – 28 January 1874
Monarch	Meiji
Preceded by	Ishii Kunimichi
Succeeded by	Takatoshi Iwamura

Personal details
- Born: 8 July 1840 Hata, Tosa, Japan
- Died: 20 February 1915 (aged 74) Bunkyō, Tokyo, Japan
- Resting place: Yanaka Cemetery

Baron Iwamura Michitoshi (岩村 通俊; 8 July 1840 – 20 February 1915) was a Japanese statesman, active in Meiji period Japan. He was the first Director of the Hokkaidō Agency from 26 January 1886 through 15 June 1888.

== Biography ==
Iwamura was born in Kōchi as the eldest son to a samurai family serving the Tosa Domain. He studied swordsmanship under Okada Izō. During the Boshin War of the Meiji Restoration, he fought under the imperial banner, in the Battle of Hokuetsu in 1868-1869.

In July 1874, Iwamura was appointed governor of Saga Prefecture. Coming shortly after the Saga Rebellion, this was regarded as a hardship posting. In 1876, he was reported to the Yamaguchi Prefecture regional office, where he coordinated central government preparations in the Satsuma Rebellion. He was appointed governor of Kagoshima Prefecture, in which capacity he supervised the funeral ceremonies for Saigō Takamori. As a reward for his services, he returned to Tokyo as a member of the Genrōin and Chairman of the Board of Audit. From April to December 1883, he served as the 3rd Governor of Okinawa Prefecture.

After serving in Okinawa for two years, Iwamura was reassigned to the other end of Japan, serving as first Director of the Hokkaidō Agency from 26 January 1886 through 15 June 1888. During his time in Hokkaidō, he supervised the completion of the Hokkaidō Agency HQ in Sapporo, and strongly promoted the development of Asahikawa. He then returned to Tokyo, where he held the post of chairman of the Genrōin from 14 June 1888 to 20 October 1890. He was selected to serve as Minister of Agriculture and Commerce under the First Yamagata Cabinet from 24 December 1889 to 17 May 1890.

On 5 June 1896, Iwamura was awarded the title of viscount (shishaku) under the kazoku peerage system, and received the Grand Cordon of the Order of the Sacred Treasure later the same year. He served as an advisor to Emperor Meiji, and was appointed to a seat in the House of Peers. He was also awarded the Order of the Rising Sun, 1st class on 23 June 1904. He died in Tokyo on 12 February 1915, and his grave is at the Yanaka Cemetery in Tokyo.

Political offices
Preceded by Uesugi Mochinori	Governor of Okinawa; Apr 1883 – Dec 1883	Succeeded by Nishimura Sutezō
Preceded by none	Director of Hokkaidō Agency; Jan 1886 – Jun 1888	Succeeded by Nagayama Takeshirō
Preceded by Inoue Kaoru	Minister of Agriculture and Commerce; Dec 1889 – May 1890	Succeeded by Mutsu Munemitsu
