= Haruhime =

Haruhime (媛姫; 1641 – 28 July 1658) was the daughter of Hoshina Masayuki, granddaughter of Tokugawa Hidetada and great-granddaughter of Tokugawa Ieyasu. In 1654, she married Uesugi Tsunakatsu, the third head of the Yonezawa Domain. They had no children, so they adopted a son of Tsunakatsu's younger sister with Kira Yoshinaka. She died in 1658 because she was poisoned by her mother, Shoko-in (1620–1691).
