= Narahara (surname) =

Narahara (written: 奈良原 or 楢原) is a Japanese surname. Notable people with the surname include:

- Hiroshi Narahara (奈良原 浩; born 1968), Japanese baseball player
- Ikkō Narahara (奈良原 一高; 1931–2020), Japanese photographer
- Narahara Shigeru (奈良原 繁; 1834–1918), Japanese politician
- Shizuka Narahara (楢原 静; born 1928), Japanese table tennis player
- Yoshiki Narahara (楢原 慶輝; born 2004), Japanese footballer
