= Mount Byōbu =

Mount Byōbu (屏風岳, Byōbu-dake) is the name of several mountains in Japan. An incomplete list of the mountains is included below.

- Mount Byōbu (Gifu), in Gifu Prefecture - see Ryōhaku Mountains
- Mount Byōbu (Okinawa), in Senkaku Islands, Okinawa Prefecture
