= Hayashi Shihei =

Japanese samurai and scholar

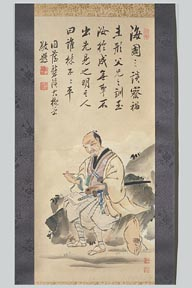
- Born: August 6, 1738; Edo, Japan
- Died: July 28, 1793 (aged 54); Sendai, Miyagi, Japan
- Occupation: Scholar
- Writing career
- Subjects: Military strategy, geography

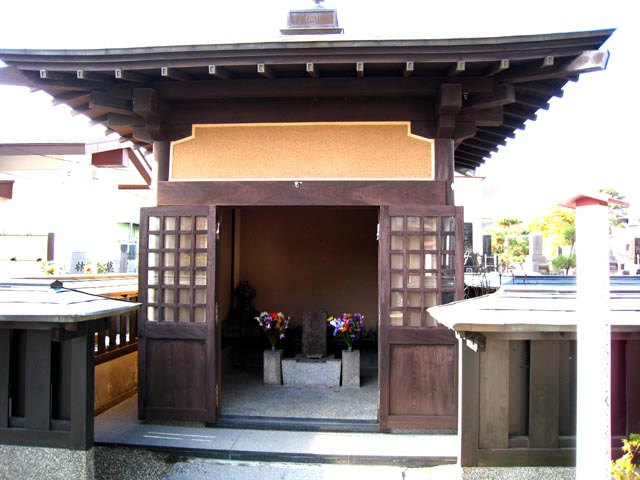
Hayashi Shihei grave, National Historic Site

Hayashi Shihei (林 子平; August 6, 1738 - July 28, 1793) was a Japanese military scholar and a retainer of the Sendai Domain. His name is sometimes transliterated (according to the Sino-Japanese reading) as Rin Shihei.

== Biography ==
Hayashi was born in Edo as the second son of Hayashi Gonhyoue Yoshimichi, a 600 koku hatamoto who served the Tokugawa shogunate as commissioner for documents. However, when Hayashi was only three years old, his father was expelled for some reason and became a ronin. Hayashi and his brother were brought up by his uncle Hayashi Jyūgo, a physician.

However, Hayashi had an elder sister, Kiyo, in the service of Date Yoshimura at the Date clan residence in Edo. She became the concubine of the 6th daimyō of Sendai Domain, Date Munemura. Through her influence, Hayashi Jyūgo received an appointment as official doctor to Sendai Domain with a stipend of 150 koku, and Hayashi's brother Hayashi Kazen was adopted as his heir. On Date Yoshimura's death, they moved to Sendai; however, Hayashi himself had no official post or stipend, and remained unemployed within the household.

He wrote a poem called "Six No's", which reads: "I have no parents, no wife, no son, no block for printing, no money, and I wish for 'no death'."

However, Hayashi was not idle. He maintained an active correspondence with many of the leading rangaku scholars, economists and military scientists of the day. He also travelled to Nagasaki in 1777 where he was especially impressed with the size and strength of the Dutch ships, and learned of Russian intentions to advance south from Siberia into Asia from the Dutch Opperhoofd. The caused him to make a journey to Matsumae in the north, and he increasing became aware of the weaknesses of the country's coastal defences, and ignorance of the outside world.

In 1786, he published Sangoku Tsūran Zusetsu (Illustrated Description of Three Countries), describing in detail Japan's geopolitical position in relation to Korea, Ryukyu and Ezo. He raised concerns that China may one day attempt to invade Japan, as had been attempted in the Kamakura period, and also emphasized the need for Japan to populate and develop its northern frontier in Hokkaido.

In 1787, he published Kaikoku Heidan (i.e. Military Defense of a Maritime Nation), a 16-volume work in which he stressed Japan's vulnerability from the sea and need for Japan to adopt Western military science and the re-education of the samurai. He complained of the lack of organized drill exercises, and stressed the importance of chōren, or teamwork drill, rather than mere individual martial training. He gave technical descriptions about shipbuilding, cannons and other military designs. He especially was critical of the Shogunate's sakoku national isolation policy. The work generated great interest, but was banned in May 1792, on the grounds that national security matters were being discussed without official consent. Hayashi was placed under house arrest. He died the following year.

Together with Takayama Hikokurō and Gamō Kunpei, Hayashi is known as one of the "Three Excelling Men of the Kansei Period" (Kansei no san-kijin 寛政の三奇人).

== Grave ==
Hayashi's grave is at the Buddhist temple of Ryuun-in in Aoba-ku, Sendai. It was proclaimed a National Historic Site in 1942. The surrounding neighbourhood was renamed Shihei-chō in 1967. A plaque commemorating his accomplishments can also be found at the site of Sendai Castle.
