= List of governors of Okinawa Prefecture =

Governor of Okinawa Prefecture
- Seal of Okinawa Prefecture

- Incumbent; Genta Koja since 30 September 2026
- Residence: Okinawa Prefectural Government Headquarters
- Term length: Four years (4 years)
- Inaugural holder: Nabeshima Naoyoshi
- Formation: 4 April 1879
- Deputy: Vice Governor of Okinawa Prefecture

The Governor of Okinawa Prefecture (沖縄県知事, Okinawa-ken chiji) is the head of the local government in Okinawa Prefecture. The governor's official residence is in Okinawa Prefecture Government Building located in Naha, the capital city of the prefecture.

== List of Governors of Okinawa Prefecture (1879–1945) ==
| Name | Period |
|---|---|
| Nabeshima Naoyoshi | April 4, 1879 – May 18, 1881 |
| Uesugi Mochinori | May 18, 1881 – April 22, 1883 |
| Iwamura Michitoshi | April 22, 1883 – December 21, 1883 |
| Nishimura Sutezō | December 21, 1883 – April 27, 1886 |
| Ōsako Sadakiyo | April 27, 1886 – April 14, 1887 |
| Minoru Fukuhara | April 14, 1887 – September 18, 1888 |
| Maruoka Kanji | September 18, 1888 – July 20, 1892 |
| Narahara Shigeru | July 20, 1892 – April 6, 1908 |
| Hibi Shigeaki | April 6, 1908 – June 1, 1913 |
| Takuya Takahashi | June 1, 1913 – June 9, 1914 |
| Kyūgorō Ōmi | June 9, 1914 – April 28, 1916 |
| Iwatarō Otagiri | April 28, 1916 – May 4, 1916 |
| Kuniyoshi Suzuki | May 4, 1916 – April 18, 1919 |
| Sōsuke Kawagoe | April 18, 1919 – May 27, 1921 |
| Jyun Wada | May 27, 1921 – October 25, 1923 |
| Ki Iwamoto | October 25, 1923 – June 24, 1924 |
| Mitsumasa Kamei | June 24, 1924 – September 28, 1926 |
| Tsuguo Imashuku | September 28, 1926 – May 7, 1927 |
| Tōjirō Iio | May 7, 1927 – December 26, 1928 |
| Chōhei Hosokawa | December 26, 1928 – July 5, 1929 |
| Masao Moriya | July 5, 1929 – August 26, 1930 |
| Jirō Ino | August 26, 1930 – June 28, 1935 |
| Hisashi Kurashige | June 28, 1935 – June 24, 1938 |
| Fusatarō Fuchigami | June 24, 1938 – January 7, 1941 |
| Hajime Hayakawa | January 7, 1941 – July 1, 1943 |
| Shuki Izumi | July 1, 1943 – January 12, 1945 |
| Akira Shimada | January 12 – June 9, 1945 |

Okinawa Prefecture was dissolved by United States until 1972.
(see List of U.S. governors of the Ryukyu Islands).

== List of Governors of Okinawa Prefecture (1972–present) ==
| Name | Took office | Left office | Political party |
|---|---|---|---|
| Chōbyō Yara | May 15, 1972 | June 24, 1976 | Independent |
| Koichi Taira | June 25, 1976 | November 23, 1978 | Independent |
| Takemori Nijima (acting) | November 23, 1978 | December 13, 1978 | Independent |
| Junji Nishime | December 13, 1978 | December 9, 1990 | Independent |
| Masahide Ōta | December 10, 1990 | December 10, 1998 | Independent |
| Keiichi Inamine | December 10, 1998 | December 9, 2006 | Independent |
| Hirokazu Nakaima | December 10, 2006 | December 9, 2014 | Independent |
| Takeshi Onaga | December 10, 2014 | August 8, 2018 | Independent |
| Kiichiro Jahana (acting) | August 9, 2018 | August 12, 2018 | Independent |
| Moritake Tomikawa (acting) | August 13, 2018 | October 3, 2018 | Independent |
| Denny Tamaki | October 4, 2018 | September 29, 2026 | Independent |
| Genta Koja | September 30, 2026 | present | Independent |

== See also ==
- United States Military Government of the Ryukyu Islands
- United States Civil Administration of the Ryukyu Islands
- Government of the Ryukyu Islands

== Sources ==
- World Statesmen.org
