= Uesugi Narinori =

- 上杉斉憲
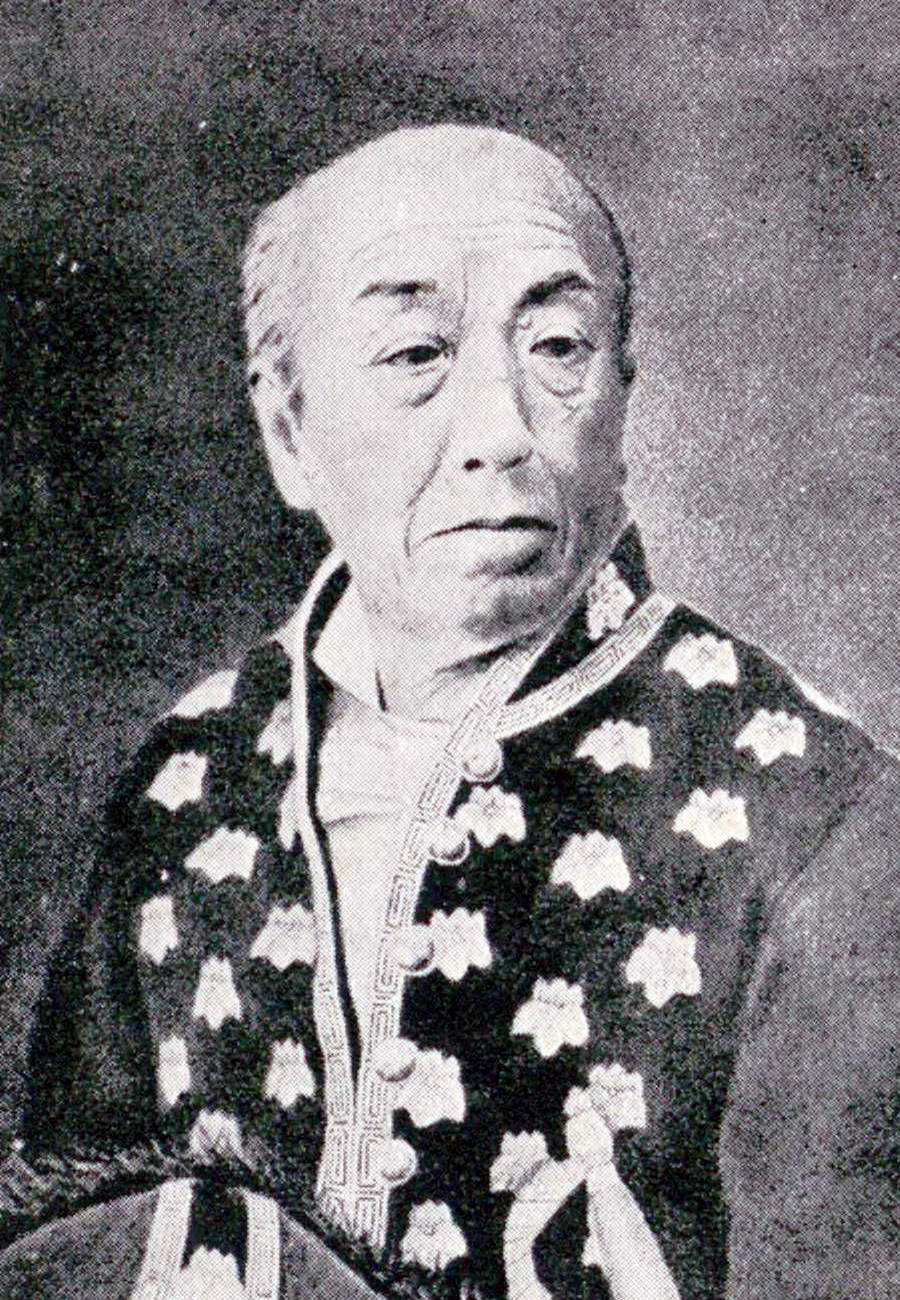
- Uesugi Narinori
- Monarchs: Shōgun: Tokugawa Ieyoshi; Tokugawa Iesada; Tokugawa Iemochi; Tokugawa Yoshinobu

12th Daimyō of Yonezawa Domain
- In office 1836–1868
- Preceded by: Uesugi Narisada
- Succeeded by: Uesugi Mochinori

Personal details
- Born: June 20, 1820
- Died: May 20, 1889 (aged 68); Tokyo, Japan
- Spouses: (1) Sadahime, daughter of Yamauchi Toyosuke of Tosa Domain; (2) Ikuhime, daughter of Matsudaira Yorihiro of Takamatsu Domain
- Parent: Uesugi Narisada (father)

Uesugi Narinori (上杉斉憲; June 20, 1820 – May 20, 1889) was the 12th daimyō of Yonezawa Domain in Dewa Province, Japan (modern-day Yamagata Prefecture), under the Edo period Tokugawa shogunate of Japan.

== Biography ==
Uesugi Narinori was the eldest son of Uesugi Narisada and received the kanji of "nari" from Shogun Tokugawa Ienari as a special mark of favor. In 1836, he was awarded the courtesy titles of Shikibu-no-daiyu and Jiju, and Court rank of Junior Fourth Rank, Lower Grade. This title was raised to Danjōitaihitsu in 1839 when he became daimyō. Early in his tenure, he revived the practice of borrowing money from his retainers, which he used to fund the military modernization of the domain in response to ever increasing demands from the shogunate to contribute to Japan's coastal defenses. In 1859, the domain suffered from a severe epidemic of smallpox. In 1863, he was ordered to accompany Shogun Tokugawa Iemochi to Kyoto and was placed in charge of security at Nijō Castle during the visit. His courtesy title was also raised to Sakonoe-gon-chūjō and in 1864 his court rank was increased to Junior Fourth Rank, Upper Grade. In 1866, in recognition of the efforts he had made to modernize the domain's military and the expenses which had been incurred, the shogunate decided to raise the kokudaka of the domain by 30,000 koku. This was the first increase in territory which the domain had received in over 200 years.

Politically Uesugi Narinori was a reformer, and supported ending Japan's national isolation policy. With the start of the Boshin War, Uesugi Narinori was initially inclined to support the new Meiji government; however Yonezawa Domain was targeted for destruction by the Satchō Alliance along with Aizu Domain and his letters to the new government were rebuffed with exceeding rude responses. Outraged by the response, he joined with Sendai Domain in forming the Ōuetsu Reppan Dōmei. Initially the domain had a string of military victories even seizing the Port of Niigata. However, with the defection of Shibata Domain, the tide turned and the Uesugi forces were pushed back. Narinori approached the Meiji government again, offering to surrender. His offer was accepted only under the condition that the Uesugi army fight against their former allies of Kubota Domain and Aizu Domain (in the Battle of Aizu). Afterwards, the Meiji government still punished the domain by a reduction in its kokudaka of 140,000 koku. Furthermore, in 1868, he was forced into retirement. In 1869, his court rank was demoted to Junior Fifth Rank. He died in Tokyo in 1889.

== See also ==
Ancestors of Uesugi Narinori

16. Uesugi Yoshinori, 5th Lord of Yonezawa (1684-1722)
8. Uesugi Shigesada, 8th Lord of Yonezawa (1720-1798)
17. Yamanaka
4. Uesugi Katsuhiro (1760-1807)
18. Ogawa
9. Ogawa O-kioi no Kata
2. Uesugi Narisada, 11th Lord of Yonezawa (1788-1839)
5. Takada
1. Uesugi Narinori, 12th Lord of Yonezawa
6. Hatakeyama Yoshichika
3. Hatakeyama

- Uesugi clan
