= Hosoi Heishu =

Japanese teacher of Confucian thought

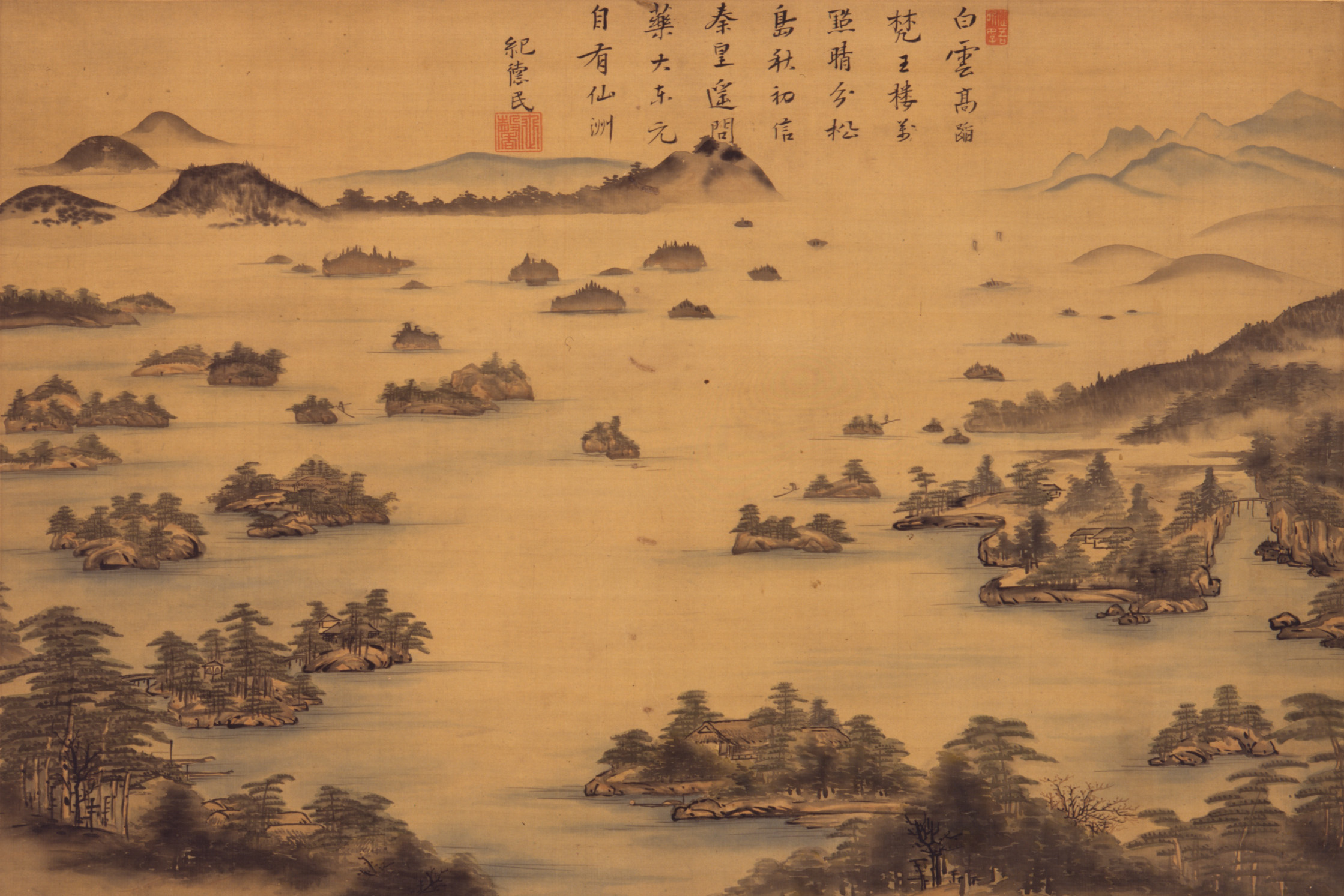
True View of Matsushima by Hosoi Heishū (1771), from the collection of Tōhoku History Museum

Hosoi Heishū (細井 平洲; August 3, 1728 – June 29, 1801) was a Japanese teacher of Confucian thought during the Edo period. He belonged to the eclectic school of Confucian philosophy, and his thought can be considered as the starting point of the eclectic brand of Confucianism.

== Life ==
Born in Hirashima Village, Owari Province, to a wealthy scholar family who later gave up their status to become farmers, Hosoi spent the first nine years of his life there as a student in a local temple. On becoming the top student, he was sent to Kyoto and Nagoya at age 17 where he studied under Nakanishi Tanen. It was during this time that Hosoi gained an education in the Chinese classics and when he was a young adult, he began giving lectures to daimyōs and commoners. After being taught in Nagoya, Hosoi moved to Nagasaki, where he would remain for three years until he was forced to return home to take care of his ailing mother. After doing so, Hosoi moved back to Nagoya, where he opened up a school, but after a short time he decided to close the school down so that he could relocate to Edo in an effort to reestablish relations with his former teacher. In 1780, Hosoi was able to secure a position as a teacher in Owari, where he occupied areas of land to be used as places where he could give his lectures and educate the local people.

== Philosophy and thought ==
Hosoi's thought was a mixture of lessons from all the schools of Confucianism existent at the time. His philosophy emphasized practicality, independence of thought, and bringing the teachings of Confucius to the general population. He believed that the scholars of the other schools made the teachings too complicated and disliked any kind of speculative thought. The practical emphasis of his teachings, along his focus on the economic conditions of the common person won him many disciples, who gave him the name of Living Buddha. One of these disciples, Uesugi Yozan, would become famous as a model daimyō, using Hosoi as an advisor during his reform programs.

According to Hosoi's philosophy, there is an internal sincere purity within everyone as well as in the natural world. This purity, which he called makoto, was the basis for all ethical action. This purity is corrupted when a person enters into the world and lives their life on Earth. In order for harmony, peace, and understanding to come about among humanity, a person had to keep their makoto pure. The concept of makoto originated within the Shinto tradition, and throughout his philosophical writings and lectures, Hosoi draws extensively from Shinto beliefs.

=== Views on women ===
Hosoi's view of women is similar to most Confucianist of the era, and his views can be said to closely resemble the perspective found in a work entitled Greater Learning For Women, which was written by Kaibara Ekken, a famous Confucianist of the Zhu Xi school. According to Hosoi's view, when a woman is in her childhood, the parents should refrain from spoiling her in order to keep her from developing a love of luxury, as well as being unable to adjust to the hardships of the married life. When the woman becomes an adult, she should become married and become a model of endurance, taking on abuse while caring for the mother-in-law and family.

== Political Work ==
The politics of the Yonezawa Domain were greatly influenced by Hosoi's teachings, particularly during the reign of Uesugi Yōzan, a daimyō who had been tutored by Hosoi since his youth. Hosoi lectured Yozan & other students on his conception of Confucian politics, and what proper statescraft was. For Hosoi, the daimyō was seen as a servant of Heaven, and that a faithful servant:

does not forget for an instant that if despite his noble status, he does not reject luxury; if despite the wealth of his land; he does not reject lavishness, and if he does not serve as a parent of his people, he will have erred in his office of servant of Heaven and will have violated the filial piety that an heir owes his ancestors.

The success of the Yonezawa Domain in administration and economic reform was largely seen as a result of Hosoi's influence and Uesugi's dedication and diligence in following plans and ruling by the maxims of "To have no waste places in his domain" and "To have no idlers among his people". There was extensive land reclamation, agricultural training for all classes, and the development of a silk & lacquer industry . Despite the success of the reforms, in Hosoi's political philosophy, loyal service is essential, and part of this loyal service is exalting one's superior. A ruler who was not infallible had to be protected by a virtuous person who was in his service. Hosoi believed that by concealing the ruler's mistakes and decadence, the people would not become corrupt and thus have a moral example that they could admire. As a result of this, Uesugi Yozan is traditionally revered throughout Japanese history as a ruler who was full of virtue and wise.

== Educator ==
As an educator, Hosoi placed emphasis on the individuality of each student present, and disliked education that involved teaching students collective thought. His beliefs in education can be seen in a letter he wrote to the Lord Of Yonezawa:

I believe it is our first duty to teach the people to understand that an honest life is the chief of all duties; but we must not forget that each is endowed with distinct individuality. Uniformity in education should be maintained only through the living example of a virtuous teacher.
