= Uesugi Mochinori =

Last daimyo of Yonezawa han in Dewa Province

Count Uesugi Mochinori
- 上杉 茂憲
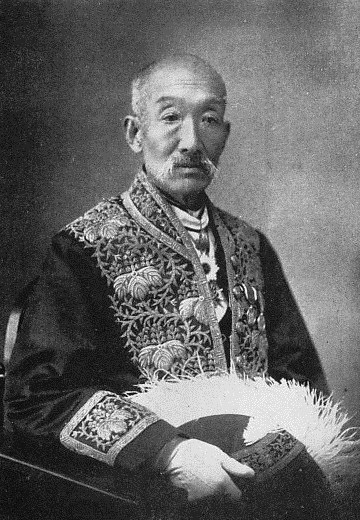
- Count Uesugi Mochinori

Member of the House of Peers
- In office 10 July 1890 – 10 July 1904 Elected by the Counts

Member of the Genrōin
- In office 24 April 1883 – 20 October 1890

2nd Governor of Okinawa Prefecture
- In office 18 May 1881 – 22 April 1883
- Monarch: Meiji
- Preceded by: Nabeshima Naoyoshi
- Succeeded by: Iwamura Michitoshi

Governor of Yonezawa Domain
- In office 18 June 1869 – 14 July 1871
- Monarch: Meiji
- Preceded by: Uesugi Narinori (as Daimyō of Yonezawa)
- Succeeded by: Position abolished

Personal details
- Born: 15 April 1844 Edo, Musashi, Japan
- Died: 18 April 1919 (aged 75) Tokyo, Japan
- Parent: Uesugi Narinori (father)

Count Uesugi Mochinori (上杉 茂憲; 15 April 1844 – 18 April 1919) was a Japanese samurai of the late Edo period who served as the last daimyō of Yonezawa han in Dewa Province. In the Meiji era he became a government official and briefly served as governor of Okinawa Prefecture.

== Biography ==
A distant relative of the famed Uesugi Kenshin, Mochinori was born in 1844. Mochinori's father Narinori took part in the movements of the northern domains which culminated in the creation of the Ōuetsu Reppan Dōmei during the Boshin War. After the end of the war, Narinori was made to retire, and Mochinori became lord of Yonezawa in his place. In his last act as lord, Mochinori distributed around 100,000 ryō of gold coins from the domain's treasury to the retainers.

Following the war, in 1871, he moved to Tokyo, and then went abroad to England to study. Later, in May 1881, he became the second governor of Okinawa Prefecture. Upon becoming governor, he traveled the prefecture and oversaw a survey of conditions and lifestyle in the islands. The resulting document remains today a valuable resource for understanding the Okinawa of that time. He petitioned the Meiji government for permission and aid to effect a number of reforms, but was denied. However, under Mochinori's administration, a great many elementary schools were founded, along with a system by which the prefectural government funded students to study in Tokyo, and variety of other educational programs.

He was replaced as governor of Okinawa in 1883, becoming a member of the Genrōin (Council of Elders in the central Tokyo-based government), and in 1884 he became a count (伯爵 hakushaku). Toward the end of his life, he also received a promotion to senior 2nd court rank (正二位 shō-ni-i). His tenure as governor of Okinawa was short, a result, it is said, of Tokyo's disapproval of the extent of his reform programs in the prefecture at a time when there remained sovereignty disputes with China over the islands. Even after leaving this office, however, he continued to make contributions towards the welfare and education of Okinawan students in Japan.

Mochinori moved to Yonezawa in 1896, and died there in 1919.

Kuninori Uesugi, the modern-day astronomer, is Mochinori's great-grandson.

== Notes ==
| Preceded by Uesugi Narinori | 13th Daimyō of Yonezawa; 1869–1871 | Succeeded by none |
| Preceded by Nabeshima Naoyoshi | 2nd Governor of Okinawa; 1881–1883 | Succeeded by Iwamura Michitoshi |
