= Nabeshima Naoyoshi =

Japanese politician (1844–1915)

Senior Second Rank Viscount Nabeshima Naoyoshi
- 鍋島 直彬
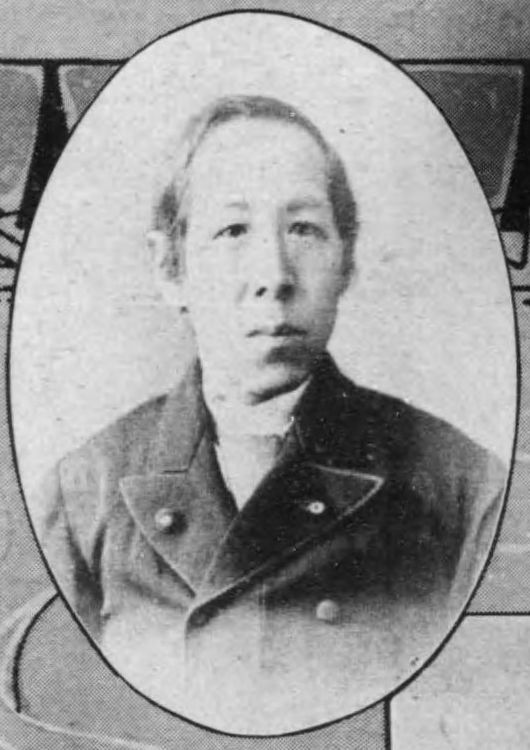

Member of the House of Peers
- In office 10 July 1890 – 13 June 1915 Elected by the Viscounts

Member of the Genrōin
- In office 18 May 1881 – 20 October 1890

1st Governor of Okinawa Prefecture
- In office 5 April 1879 – 18 May 1881
- Monarch: Meiji
- Preceded by: Office established
- Succeeded by: Uesugi Mochinori

13th Daimyō of Kashima Domain
- In office 1848–1871
- Shōgun: Tokugawa Ieyoshi; Tokugawa Iesada; Tokugawa Iemochi; Tokugawa Yoshinobu
- Preceded by: Nabeshima Naosaga
- Succeeded by: Position abolished

Personal details
- Born: 30 January 1844 Kashima, Hizen, Japan
- Died: 13 June 1915 (aged 71) Kashima, Saga, Japan

Viscount Nabeshima Naoyoshi (鍋島 直彬; 30 January 1844 – 13 June 1915) was the 13th and final daimyō of Kashima Domain in Hizen Province, Kyūshū, Japan (modern-day Saga Prefecture). Before the Meiji Restoration, his courtesy title was Bizen no Kami. He became a politician in the Meiji era, and served as the first governor of Okinawa Prefecture.

== Biography ==
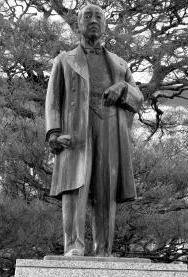
Bronze statue of Nabeshima Naoyoshi at Kashima High School, Kashima, Saga

Born in the Kashima Domain in Hizen Province, Naoyoshi was the 3rd son of the 10th daimyō of Kashima, Nabeshima Naonaga. In 1848, the 13th daimyō of Kashima, Nabeshima Naosaga, went into forced retirement under strong pressure from Nabeshima Naomasa due to fiscal mismanagement, and the title went to Naoyoshi. During the early part of his administration, Kashima's financial affairs were so dire that they came to be entirely handled by the main Saga Domain, and in 1851 Naoyoshi even proposed that the domain be abolished and absorbed into Saga. He was opposed by the other branches of the Nabeshima clan (i.e. Hasunoike Domain and Ogi Domain.

In 1853, Kashima Domain had a further financial burden imposed when the Tokugawa shogunate assigned it responsibility for security during the visit of Russian diplomat Yevfimy Putyatin to Nagasaki as part of Russia’s efforts to end Japan's national isolation policy and to establish commercial and diplomatic relations.

From 1860, Naoyoshi began secret discussions with representatives of the Imperial court and became a supporter of the movement to overthrow the Tokugawa regime. In 1866 he protected Soejima Taneomi, who was being hunted by the Shogunate. In 1868, with the start of the Boshin War, he pledged Kashima domain in support of the Satchō Alliance and Emperor Meiji.

In June 1869, the title of daimyō was abolished, and Naoyoshi was appointed domain governor. However, in 1871, Kashima Domain itself was abolished with the abolition of the han system, and became part of the new Saga Prefecture. Naoyoshi subsequently relocated to Tokyo.

From August 1872 to 1876, Naoyoshi traveled to the United States. On his return, he served as an advisor to Emperor Meiji, and traveled in the retinue of the Emperor to Kyoto in 1877, during the Satsuma Rebellion. From 1878, he was appointed an official tutor to the Emperor under the Imperial Household Ministry.

Following the 1879 abolition of the Ryūkyū Kingdom and its annexation by Japan as Okinawa Prefecture, Naoyoshi was appointed the prefecture's first governor, arriving there aboard the Tokai-maru on 18 May 1879.

Under his administration, the national public education system began to be implemented in Okinawa, with a particular focus on teaching the standard Japanese language, which very few in the islands could speak at that time. Many schools were established during the period of Naoyoshi's administration, and the prefecture's economic production was increased, particularly in the area of sugar production.

In 1881, Naoyoshi was recalled to Tokyo, and became president of the Genrōin. With the establishment of the kazoku peerage, he became a viscount (子爵, shishaku), and a member of the House of Peers on the establishment of the Diet of Japan in 1890.

In his later years he helped build hospitals and schools in the region of Kashima, which he had once ruled, and was awarded Second Court rank shortly before his death in 1915.

Preceded by Nabeshima Naosaga	13th Daimyō of Kashima; 1848–1871	Succeeded by none (domain abolished)
Preceded by none	1st Governor of Okinawa; 1879–1881	Succeeded by Uesugi Mochinori
