= Hibi Kimei =

Governor of Okinawa Prefecture from 1908 to 1913

- 日比 重明

Governor of Okinawa Prefecture
- In office 6 April 1908 – 1 June 1913
- Monarchs: Meiji; Taishō
- Preceded by: Narahara Shigeru
- Succeeded by: Takahashi Takuya

Personal details
- Born: 26 June 1848 Ise Province, Japan
- Died: 2 August 1926 (aged 78)
- Occupation: Politician

Hibi Kimei (日比 重明; 26 June 1848 – 2 August 1926) was Governor of Okinawa Prefecture (1908–1913).
