= Uesugi Tsunakatsu =

Japanese feudal lord (1639–1664)

- 上杉綱勝
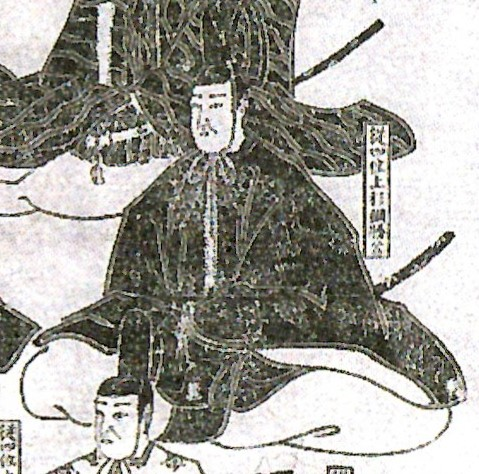
- Uesugi Tsunakatsu

3rd Daimyō of Yonezawa Domain
- In office 1645–1664
- Monarchs: Shōgun: Tokugawa Iemitsu; Tokugawa Ietsuna
- Preceded by: Uesugi Sadakatsu
- Succeeded by: Uesugi Tsunanori

Personal details
- Born: January 25, 1639
- Died: June 30, 1664 (aged 25)
- Spouse(s): Haruhime, daughter of Hoshina Masayuki
- Parent: Uesugi Sadakatsu (father)

Uesugi Tsunakatsu (上杉綱勝; 25 January 1639 – 30 June 1664) was the 3rd daimyō of Yonezawa Domain in Dewa Province during the Edo period Tokugawa Shogunate of Japan, and 19th hereditary chieftain of the Uesugi clan. His courtesy title was Harima-no-kami.

== Biography ==
Uesugi Tsunakatsu was the son of Uesugi Sadakatsu, the 2nd daimyō of Yonezawa. He was initially named "Uesugi Sanekatsu", but received a kanji from Shogun Tokugawa Ietsuna as a mark of special favor and changed his name to "Tsunakatsu". He became daimyō on the death of his father in 1645. However, in 1649 the domain was assigned the herculean task of repairing the stone walls on the moats of Edo Castle, which bankrupted the domain's finances. Although he attempted to improve on the domain's ability to raise taxes by a new land survey, the results were only minor. In 1651, he received confirmation of his court rank of Lower Fourth Rank, Junior grade, and the additional courtesy title of Jijū. The domain also came under increasing criticism from the shogunate for being lukewarm on enforcement of anti-Kirishitan edicts, which cumulated with an order by the council of rōjū that the cadet branch of the Uesugi clan headed by Yamaura Mitsunori be put to death on suspicion of being Kirishitan.

In 1654, Tsunakatsu married Haruhime, the daughter of Hoshina Masayuki. She died in 1659 at the age of 19 and it was widely suspected that she had been poisoned by her mother-in-law, Shoko-in (1620–1691).

Tsunakatsu died in 1664 without heir and also under highly suspect circumstances. Normally, this would be cause for attainder of the domain. However, Hoshina Masayuki worked out a posthumous adoption. Tsukakatsu had a younger sister who was married to Kira Yoshinaka. Their eldest son (and thus Tsunakatsu's nephew) was adopted to carry on the Uesugi family line, becoming Uesugi Tsunanori. While this was not unusual in itself, Tsunakatsu had fallen ill on the night after he visited his sister and had dinner with Kira Yoshinaka. Although official histories indicate that he had a perforated ulcer, for the seven days before he died he exhibited all of the symptoms of having been poisoned. As popular opinion held Kira Yoshinaka to be an arch-villain due to the events of the Chushingura, it was no stretch to imagine that he was behind the poisoning of Uesugi Tsunakatsu, and various publications and dramas promoting this conspiracy had begun to circulate even by the mid-Edo Period. Furthermore, Yonezawa Domain was reduced in kokudaka from 300,000 koku to 150,000 koku on Tsunakatsu's death. The 150,000 koku lost consisted of the territories of Shinobu in Mutsu Province and portions of Okitama in Dewa Province, which were given to Hoshina Masayuki to administer
