= Kashima Domain =

Japanese domain of the Edo period

Kashima Domain 鹿島藩
- Domain of Japan
- 1609–1871
- Mon of the Nabeshima clan

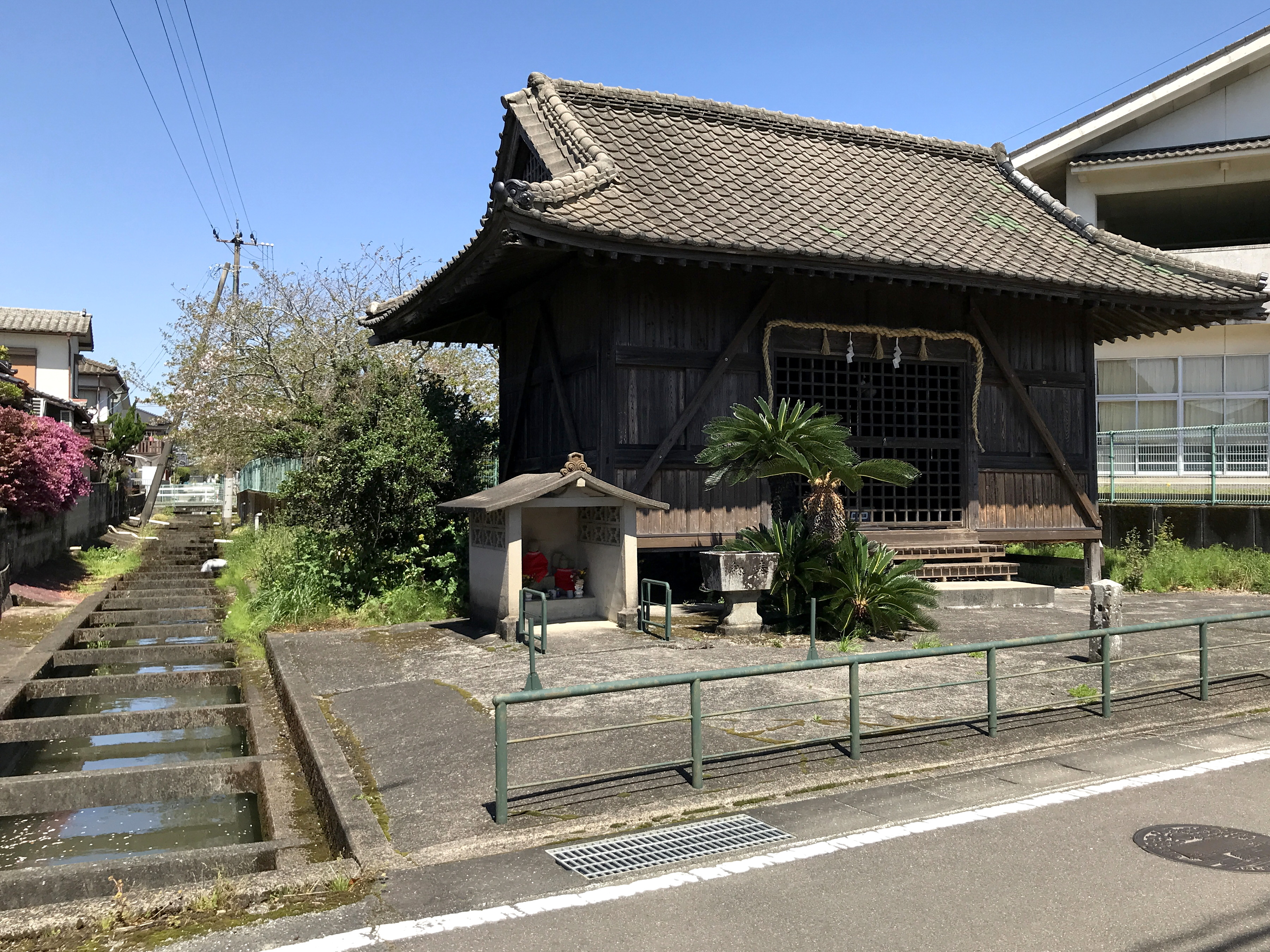
- Kashima Shrine of site of Kashima Castle
- Capital: Tsunehiro Castle (1609–1807); Kashima Castle (1807–1871)
- Government
  - Type: Daimyō
- Daimyō
  - 1609-1624: Nabeshima Tadashige (first)
  - 1844-1871: Nabeshima Naoyoshi (last)
- Historical era: Edo period
  - Established: 1609
  - Disestablished: 1871
- Today part of: Saga Prefecture
- Location of Kashima Castle Kashima Domain (Japan)

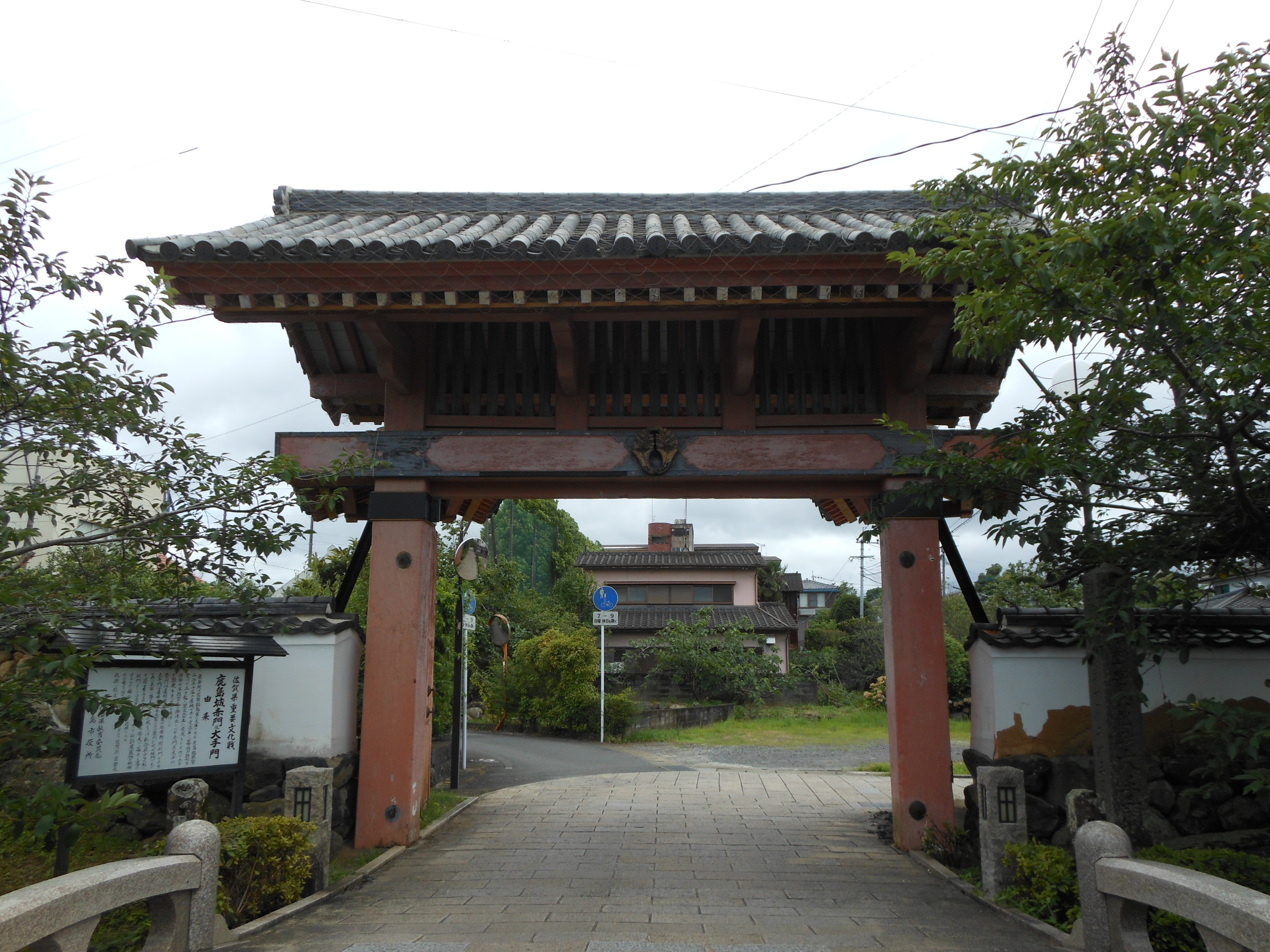
The Ote-mon Gate of Kashima Castle

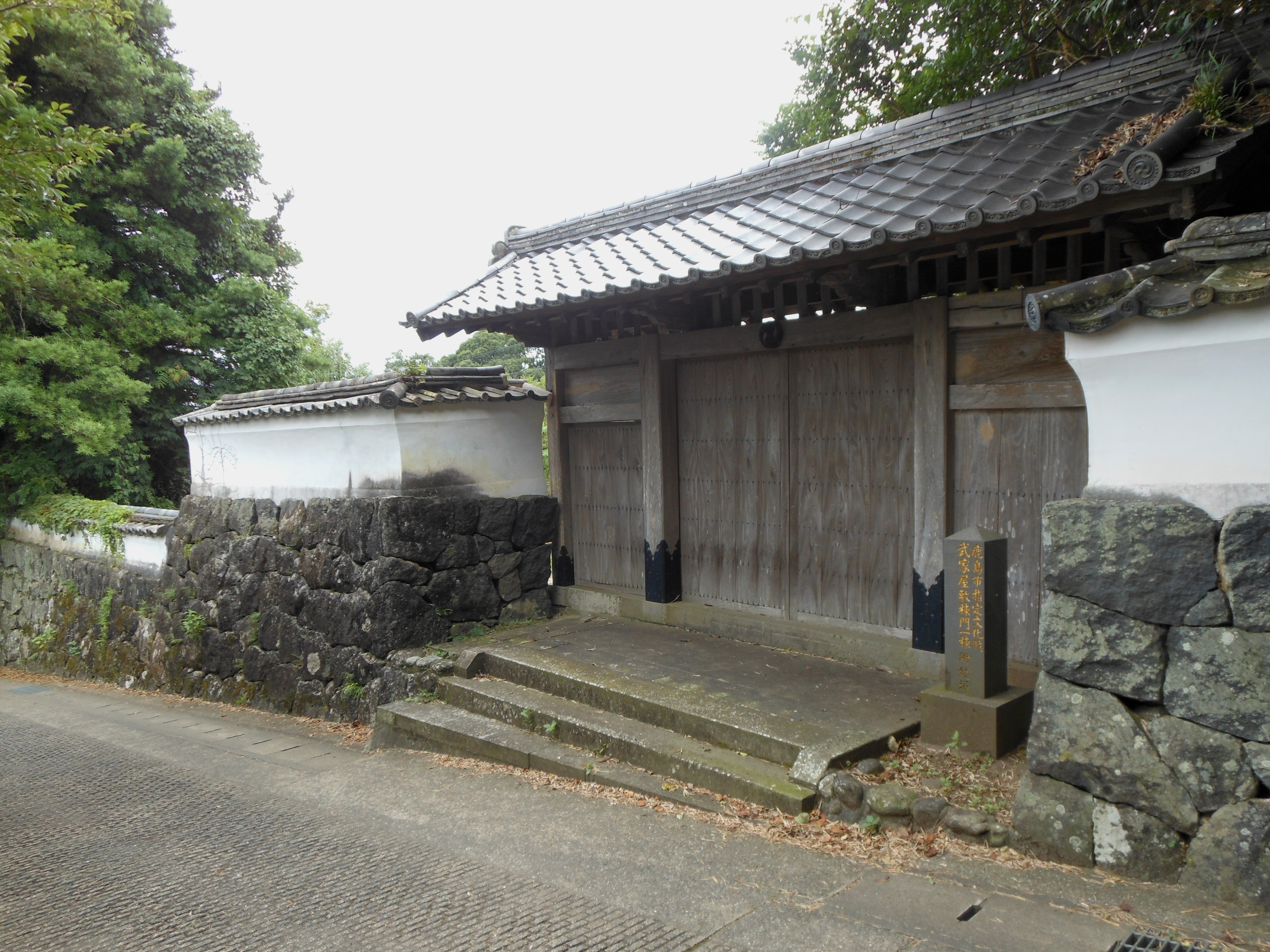
Old samurai residence of Kashima Castle

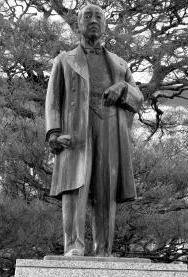
Nabeshima Naoyoshi, final daimyo of Kashima Domain

Kashima Domain (鹿島藩, Kashima-han) was a Japanese domain of the Edo period. It was regarded as a sub-domain of Saga Domain. The domain was centered in what is now the city of Kashima, Saga. It was ruled by a cadet branch of the tozama daimyō Nabeshima clan for all of its history.

== History ==
Nabeshima Tadashige, the younger sibling of Nabeshima Katsushige, the inaugural daimyō of the Saga Domain, received 20,000 koku and permission to establish a cadet branch of the Nabeshima clan in 1610. He then acquired an additional 5,000 koku in Katori District, Shimōsa Province, his birthplace, thereby establishing the domain with a total of 25,000 koku. The domain was centered around Tsunehiro Castle, located in what is now the urban center of the city of Kashima, Saga. In 1642, during the tenure of the second daimyō Nabeshima Masashige, Nabeshima Katsushige asked to adopt his ninth son, Naotomo. However, as Masashige had no other heir, his request was denied. This outraged the parent house, as the very purpose of establishing a sub-domain with a cadet branch of the clan was to provide "insurance" for the main lineage, and the idea of refusing one's overlord and clan chieftain was unheard of. This lead Masashige being forced to return 20,000 koku of territory, accept a reduction in status to hatamoto, and was sent to Shimōsa to oversee his father's original 5,000 koku estate. Eventually, Katsushige bestowed his 20,000 koku territory, upon Nabeshima Naotomo. Nabeshima Naoto, the ninth daimyō, constructed Kashima Castle in 1821, designating it as his official residence. Following the abolition of the han system and the establishment of prefectures in 1871, "Kashima Prefecture" was formed. It later merged with Saga Prefecture through a series of administrative changes involving Imari Prefecture, Saga Prefecture, Mizuma Prefecture, and Nagasaki Prefecture. Nabeshima Naoyoshi, the final daimyō, was granted the title of viscount in the kazoku peerage order in 1884.

The Akamon (main gate), Otemon, and the earthen walls of the Jin'ya have survived to this day. Additionally, the Tsunehiro Castle Gate has been relocated to a private residence, preserving a piece of historical architecture.

== Holdings at the end of the Edo period ==
As with most domains in the han system, Hasunoike Domain consisted of several discontinuous territories calculated to provide the assigned kokudaka, based on periodic cadastral surveys and projected agricultural yields.

- Hizen Province
  - 11 villages in Fujitsu District

== List of daimyō ==
	Name	Tenure	Courtesy title	Court Rank	Kokudaka
Nabeshima clan, 1609–1871 (Tozama daimyo)
1	Nabeshima Tadashige (鍋島忠茂)	1609–1624	Izumi-no-kami (和泉守)	Junior 5th Rank Lower Grade (従五位下)	25,000 koku
2	Nabeshima Masashige (鍋島正茂)	1624–1642	none -	Junior 6th Rank Lower Grade (従五位下)	25,000 --> 5000 koku
3	Nabeshima Naotomo (鍋島直朝)	1642–1672	Izumi-no-kami (和泉守)	Junior 5th Rank Lower Grade (従五位下)	5000 koku --> 20,000 koku
4	Nabeshima Naoeda (鍋島直條)	1672–1705	Bizen-no-kami (備前守)	Junior 5th Rank Lower Grade (従五位下)	20,000 koku
5	Nabeshima Naokata (鍋島直堅)	1705–1727	Izumi-no-kami (和泉守)	Junior 5th Rank Lower Grade (従五位下)	20,000 koku
6	Nabeshima Naosato (鍋島直郷)	1728–1763	Bizen-no-kami (備前守)	Junior 5th Rank Lower Grade (従五位下)	20,000 koku
7	Nabeshima Naohiro(鍋島直熙)	1763–1770	Bizen-no-kami (備前守)	Junior 5th Rank Lower Grade (従五位下)	20,000 koku
8	Nabeshima Naoyoshi (鍋島直宜)	1770–1801	Bizen-no-kami (備前守)	Junior 5th Rank Lower Grade (従五位下)	20,000 koku
9	Nabeshima Naonori (鍋島直彜)	1800–1820	Tanba-no-kami (丹波守)	Junior 5th Rank Lower Grade (従五位下)	20,000 koku
10	Nabeshima Naonaga (鍋島直永)	1820–1839	Tanba-no-kami (丹波守)	Junior 5th Rank Lower Grade (従五位下)	20,000 koku
11	Nabeshima Naoharu (鍋島直晴)	1839	None	None	20,000 koku
12	Nabeshima Naokata (鍋島直賢)	1840–1848	Bizen-no-kami (備前守)	Junior 5th Rank Lower Grade (従五位下)	20,000 koku
13	Nabeshima Naoyoshi (鍋島直彬)	1848–1871	Bizen-no-kami (備前守)	Junior 5th Rank Lower Grade (従五位下)	20,000 koku

== See also ==
- List of Han
- Abolition of the han system
