= Jahana Noboru =

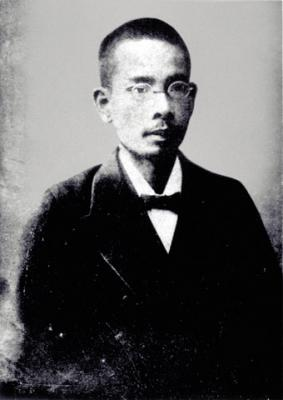
Jahana Noboru

Jahana Noboru (謝花 昇; November 16, 1865 – October 26, 1908) was an official in the government of Japan's Okinawa Prefecture, and an Okinawan rights activist, in connection with the Freedom and People's Rights Movement (自由民権運動, Jiyū minken undō).

== Life and career ==
Jahana Noboru was born in 1865 into a farming family in Kochinda magiri on Okinawa, then part of the Ryukyu Kingdom. In 1882, he traveled to Tokyo to study, one of five to be the first to be funded by Okinawa Prefecture to do so, attending Gakushūin and Tokyo University. The first Okinawan university graduate, he was hired into the prefectural government as an engineer of agriculture and forestry. In this role, he set forth to revise various strict and oppressive agricultural policies, including regulations related to sugar production, and wrote a book on the matter, On the Okinawa Sugar Industry (沖縄糖業論, Okinawa tōgyō ron). He also helped establish the Agriculture and Industry Bank (農工銀行, Nōkō ginkō), and was involved in forestry and other related projects. However, he opposed the governor of the prefecture, Narahara Shigeru, on various aspects of policies related to the sales of public land and the bringing of new land under cultivation, and resigned from employment at the prefectural office.

Returning to Tokyo, Jahana joined with Tōyama Kyūzō and gathered together other commoners of a like mind, forming the "Okinawa Club" and beginning a suffrage movement. He published a treatise on his positions entitled On Current Affairs of Okinawa (沖縄時論, Okinawa jiron). The movement was opposed by the governor, prefectural government, and various former officials, who strongly pressured the organization, and eventually forced it to break up. This setback drove Jahana mad, and he died at age 44. He is also known as the person whom Itagaki Taisuki supported.
