= Teradaya incident =

Clashes between samurai

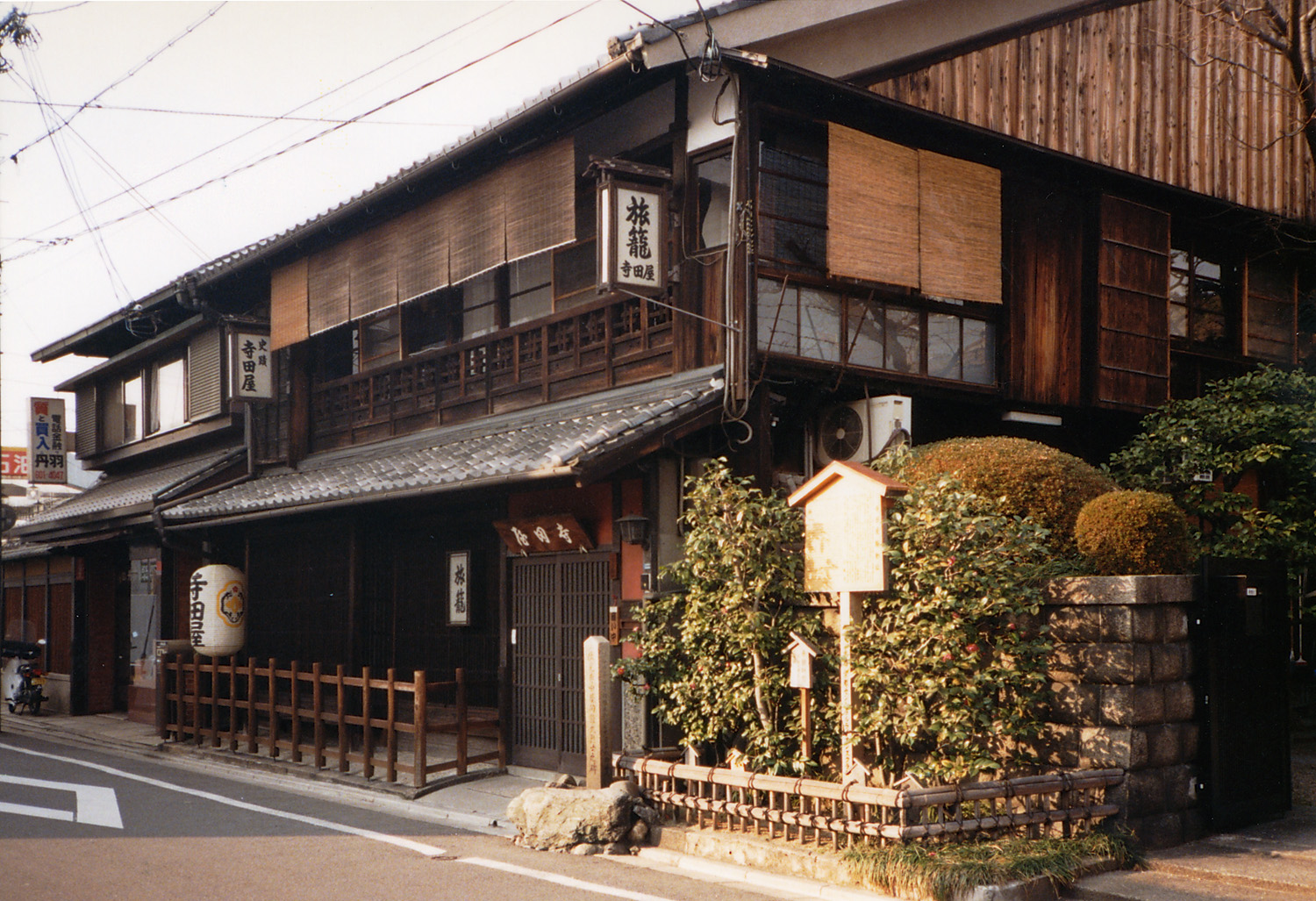
The Teradaya Inn in Kyoto, where both incidents occurred.

The Teradaya Incident is the name used for two clashes between samurai during the bakumatsu period. Both of them took place in Teradaya, a ryokan inn in Fushimi, south of Kyōto. The first one, in May 1862 (also called the Teradaya Disturbance), was the suppression of Sonnō-jōi followers of the Satsuma domain; it was the first armed rebellion against the shogunate. The second one, in March 1866, was a failed attack on Sakamoto Ryōma; it became a popular subject of Japanese books and films.

== In 1862 ==
During the bakumatsu period, the Satsuma domain was divided into two factions: the "progressives", who wanted to overthrow the shogunate and give supreme power to the emperor, and the "moderates", who wanted to forge stronger links between the shogunate and the emperor (the kōbu gattai policy).

Around 60 to 70 samurai, led by Arima Shinshichi and including Ryōma as one of the progressives, met at the Teradaya inn to organize the assassinations of imperial counselor Kujō Hisatada and shogun's Kyoto representative Sakai Tadaaki to sever the relationship between the two powers. Most of the conspirators were from Satsuma. Shimazu Hisamitsu, the daimyo of Satsuma, heard about the meeting and ordered that the conspirators be brought to the Satsuma residence in Kyoto or killed if they refuse. In fact, he was following the imperial decree ordering him to take care of the rōnin problem in Kyoto.

As it was improbable that the ishin shishi would come without a fight, the daimyo sent nine Satsuma samurai under the leadership of Narahara Shigeru to attack the inn. After a short but bloody clash, eight rebels (including Arima himself) were dead, while the nine attackers had only one dead and two wounded. The remaining conspirators gave up and went to the residence. It was the end of the first armed conspiracy against the shogunate.

== In 1866 ==
On 9 March 1866, the agents of the shogunate raided the inn to arrest or assassinate Sakamoto Ryōma. He was saved by the alarm raised by his future wife Narasaki Ryō (Oryō), who rushed naked or in her bathing towel from the bathroom to warn him. Ryōma defended himself with a Smith & Wesson revolver; he was injured but escaped from the inn together with his bodyguard Miyoshi Shinzo and hid in a storehouse at a nearby canal, where Satsuma samurai rescued him.

The original Teradaya inn was burnt down in the Battle of Toba-Fushimi in 1868. It was rebuilt as a tourist attraction.
