= Narasaki Ryō =

Japanese woman active in political affairs (1841–1906)

- 楢崎 龍
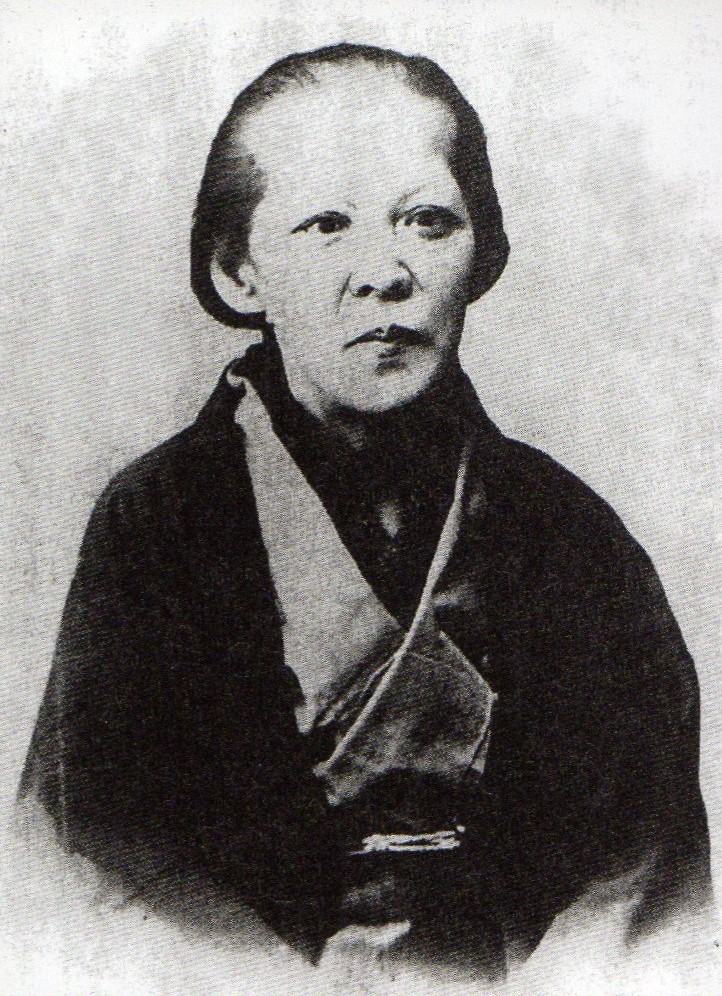
- Narasaki Ryō in her later years
- Born: July 23, 1841; Kyoto, Japan
- Died: January 15, 1906 (aged 64)
- Resting place: Shigaraki-ji, Ōtsu, Yokosuka, Kanagawa Prefecture, Japan
- Other names: Oryō (お龍); Nishimura Tsuru (西村 ツル)
- Known for: saved the life of her husband Sakamoto Ryōma and his bodyguard by running semi-naked through the inn to his room to warn them of the assassins' arrival during the Teradaya incident in 1866
- Spouses: Sakamoto Ryōma (m. 1864; died 1867) Nishimura Matsubē (m. 1875–1906)
- Parents: Narasaki Shōsaku (father); Shigeno Sada (mother)
- Relatives: Nakazawa Mitsue (sister); Sugeno Kimi (sister); Narasaki Taichirō (brother); Narasaki Kenkichi (brother)

Japanese name
- Kanji: 楢崎 龍
- Hiragana: ならさき りょう
- Katakana: ナラサキ リョウ
Transcriptions
- Romanization: Narasaki Ryō

Narasaki Ryō (楢崎 龍; July 23, 1841 – January 15, 1906) was a Japanese woman and the wife of Sakamoto Ryōma, an architect of the Meiji Restoration. Commonly called Oryō (お龍) in Japan, she lived from the end of the Edo period (the end of the Tokugawa shogunate) to the Meiji period. After the death of her first husband, she married the merchant Nishimura Matsubē and was renamed Nishimura Tsuru (西村 ツル).

== Early life ==
She was born in Kyoto on July 23, 1841, as the eldest daughter of the physician Narasaki Shōsaku and his wife Shigeno Sada. She had two younger sisters Narasaki Mitsue (later Nakazawa Mitsue) and Narasaki Kimi (later Sugeno Kimi), and two younger brothers Narasaki Taichirō and Narasaki Kenkichi. Her father was arrested and went to prison during the Ansei Purge. He died after being released from prison when she was 21 years old.

Oryō married Sakamoto Ryōma in 1864.

== Teradaya Incident ==
Oryō is best known for saving the life of her future husband Sakamoto Ryōma from an assassination attempt during the Teradaya Incident. She worked at Kyoto's Teradaya Inn, and while taking a bath in the evening on March 9, 1866, heard one of the assassins outside, who immediately thrust his spear through the bathroom window right by her shoulder. She grabbed the spear with one hand and confronted him in a loud voice. She then quickly jumped out of the bathtub and, putting on her robe without a sash, ran out into a garden and went up to the second floor of the inn to warn Sakamoto, who was in his room with his bodyguard Miyoshi Shinzo. Sakamoto and Miyoshi soon fought their way out and escaped with slight injuries.

Sakamoto's injuries during the attack led them to visit several hot springs in Kagoshima Prefecture that were believed to have healing properties, in what has been said to be the first Japanese honeymoon.

== Later years and death ==
Oryō was widowed after Sakamoto Ryōma's assassination during the Ōmiya incident on December 10, 1867. She married the merchant Nishimura Matsubē (西村松兵衛) in 1875 and took the name of Nishimura Tsuru (西村 ツル). She later adopted a child of her sister, who died young.

In her later years, Oryō suffered from alcoholism. Despite the fame of her first husband, Oryō died in poverty on January 15, 1906, at the age of 64. She was buried at Shigaraki-ji, Ōtsu, Yokosuka, in Kanagawa Prefecture. Eight years later, with assistance from Mitsuaki Tanaka and Kagawa Keizō, and her younger sister Nakazawa Mitsue, her widower Nishimura Matsubē and his colleagues managed to erect a tombstone for her in August 1914.

== Gallery ==
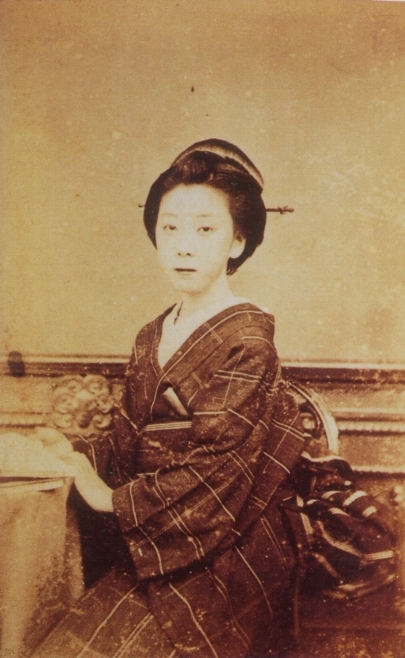
Narasaki Ryō as a young woman.

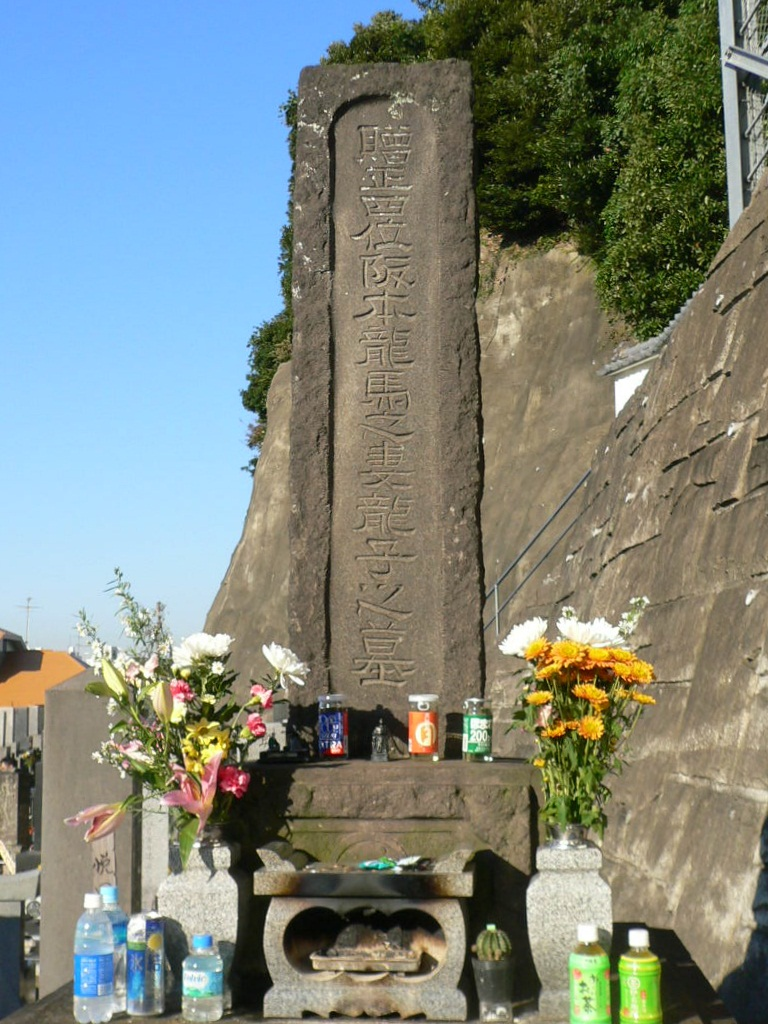
Gravestone of Narasaki Ryō at Shigaraki-ji, Ōtsu, Yokosuka, Kanagawa Prefecture, Japan

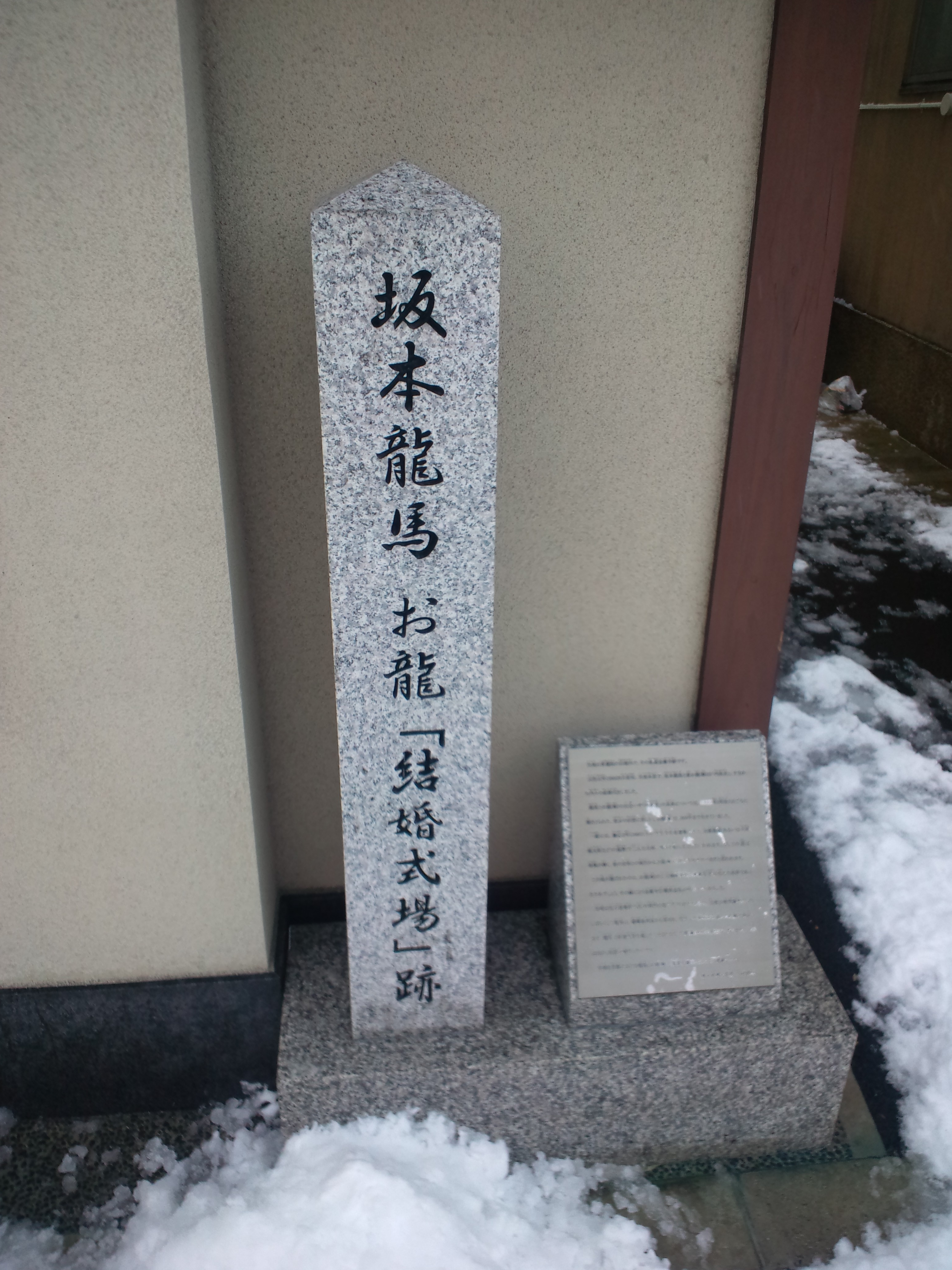
Sakamoto Ryōma and Narasaki Ryō wedding venue's stone stele marker in Kyoto

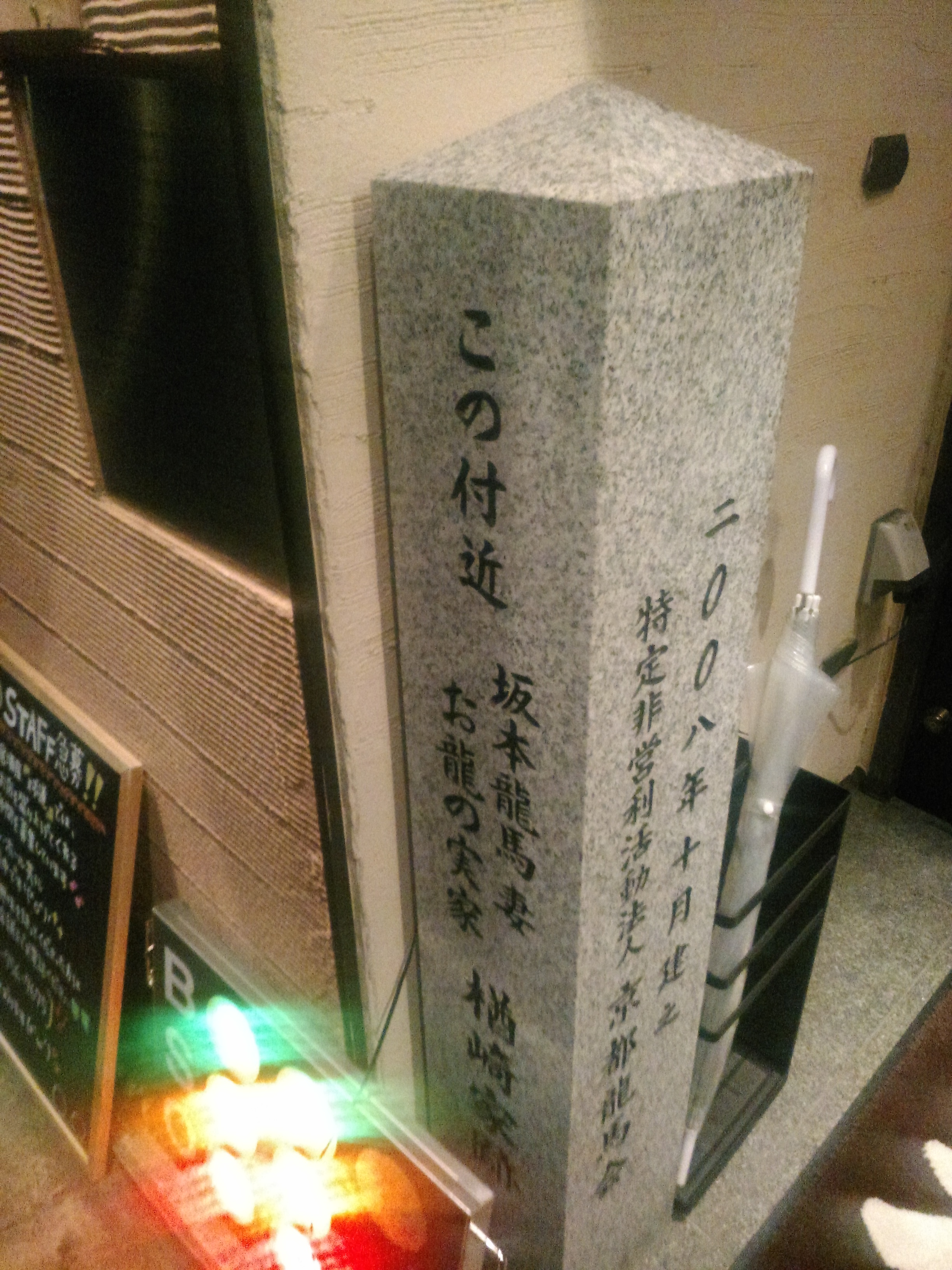
Narasaki family's former residence stone stele marker in Kyoto
