= Akira Shimada =

Japanese politician

- 島田 叡
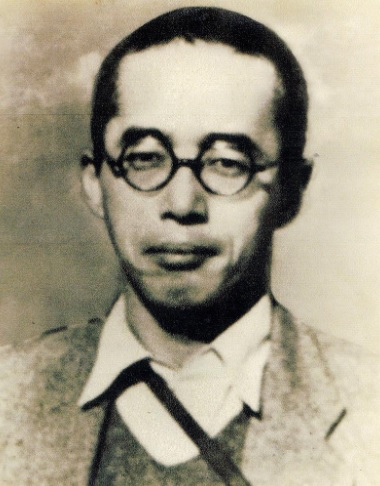

Governor of Okinawa Prefecture
- In office 12 January 1945 – 26 June 1945
- Monarch: Meiji
- Preceded by: Shuki Izumi
- Succeeded by: Office abolished

Personal details
- Born: 25 December 1901 Kobe, Hyōgo, Japan
- Died: c. 26 June 1945 (aged 43) Shimajiri, Okinawa, Japan
- Resting place: Tama Cemetery
- Education: Tokyo Imperial University
- Occupation: Politician

Akira Shimada (島田 叡, Shimada Akira; 25 December 1901 – c. 26 June 1945) was the last governor of Okinawa Prefecture before Japan's defeat in 1945. He died during the Battle of Okinawa.

== Early years ==
Born in Suma-ku, Kobe in 1901, Akira Shimada was the first-born son of a physician. He studied in the Department of Law at Tokyo University. In college, he was a baseball star and rugby player. After graduating, he joined the Ministry of Interior Affairs as a law enforcement official.

Before being governor, Shimada became the top police official in Saga Prefecture. He attended study meetings at Nishibori Shōin, where he was deeply interested in the book Hagakure and the teachings of Saigō Takamori on the chivalric code of Japanese warriors, bushido. These teachings ultimately motivated Shimada to run for governor.

== Governor of Okinawa ==
On 10 January 1945, he was appointed governor of Okinawa Prefecture, leaving his position as Chief of the General Affairs Department in Osaka Prefecture. The previous governor, Shuki Izumi (泉 守紀; 1898 – 1984), was appointed Governor of Kagawa Prefecture. It was the height of World War II, with intervention by the American forces regarded as inevitable. When accepting the offer, he was noted to say: "If someone must go, it should be me. I can't ask someone else to (possibly die) do this." He took a Japanese sword and potassium cyanide with him to Okinawa.

=== On the mainland of Okinawa ===
On 31 January, he arrived in Okinawa and immediately tried to improve relations between the Thirty-Second Army and Okinawa Prefecture. He first evacuated the inhabitants to northern Okinawa, an action which had been delayed under the previous governor. Next, he placed stockpiles of food in various parts of the prefecture. In the latter part of February, he flew to Taiwan and secured 3000 koku of Taiwan rice, which was sent to Naha. In March, violent air raids began and the Okinawan local government moved from Naha to a cave in Shuri, the previous capital of Okinawa. As the situation worsened, he moved from one cave to another, keeping close relations with the army. He was friendly even to female workers. When asked to wash his face, he said that he could not use precious water. Water was brought at great risk. He used the water after it was used to wash rice. He was against the Army targeting southern parts of Okinawa, since many inhabitants remained there and might be affected. He said that it would be absurd to discard the well-equipped Shuri and that they should die in honor at Shuri. General Mitsuru Ushijima, the commander of the 32nd Army, on the contrary, concluded the meeting saying that the aim of the army would be to delay American attacks on the mainland of Japan as long as possible. On 9 June, Shimada ordered the dissolution of the prefecture and police staff, wishing to preserve their lives. On 26 June, Shimada left the cave called Todorokino Gō with Taizo Arai, the police chief and, after that, their whereabouts were unknown.

=== Admiral Minoru Ōta and Shimada ===
Admiral Minoru Ōta and Shimada were close friends in Okinawa. In place of Shimada, Ota sent a telegram to the vice-admiral of mainland Japan reporting on the tragic conditions of Okinawans.

== Suicide ==
In an article in the Okinawa Times, a local Okinawa newspaper, Hatsuo Yamamoto, who was the chief of a machine gun group, said:

A part of our independent machine-gun team went to the seashore from Mabuni to Gushichan. At sunset, I went about two hundred meters along the seashore looking for something to eat. There were three local people who said that the governor was in a cave. It was a cave of about 6 meters in length, and his head was at the inner part of the cave and the left side of the body was under the opposite side. "Mr. Governor, Sir." "Yes, I am Governor Shimada" and he took out a name card from the chest. "Were you injured, sir?" "Yes, my foot was injured." The governor gave me two pieces of raw sugar.

He said, "Be healthy". On the next morning, I prepared something to eat for him and brought it to [the] cave. The three local people said that the governor had died. In the cave, he was dead, with a pistol slipping from his right hand. He wore a shirt with half-length sleeves; trousers with shimofuri-pattern. He was stubbly.

The cave where he died is now called Todorokino Gō, also known as the last Okinawa Prefectural Office.

== Legacy ==
After the death of Shimada, Interior Minister Genki Abe gave him an Interior Minister Award and praised him as a good example of government officials. In 1951, the tower of Shimamori was constructed as a memorial to Shimada and 453 officials of the Okinawa Prefectural Office. The Shimada Cup is now given to the winning team of the high school baseball tournament in Okinawa.
