= Maruoka Kanji =

- 丸岡 莞爾

Governor of Kōchi Prefecture
- In office 20 July 1892 – 29 November 1892
- Monarch: Meiji
- Preceded by: Chōsh Hirotake
- Succeeded by: Ishida Eikichi

Governor of Okinawa Prefecture
- In office 18 September 1888 – 20 July 1892
- Monarch: Meiji
- Preceded by: Fukuhara Minoru
- Succeeded by: Narahara Shigeru

Personal details
- Born: 11 July 1836 Tosa Province, Japan
- Died: 6 March 1898 (aged 61)
- Resting place: Aoyama Cemetery
- Occupation: Politician, Waka poet

Maruoka Kanji (丸岡 莞爾; 11 July 1836 – 6 March 1898) was Governor of Okinawa Prefecture (1888–1892) and Governor of Kōchi Prefecture (1892).

== Bibliography ==
- 安岡, 章太郎 『鏡川』 新潮社、2000年、41頁。ISBN 978-4-103-21910-1
  - 『新潮』2000年3月号に掲載:snippet1 snippet2
- 上田正昭他『日本人名大辞典』講談社、2001年。
- 歴代知事編纂会 『日本の歴代知事』3、東京堂出版、1982年、396・525頁。ASIN B000J7L0TO。
  - 『新編日本の歴代知事』、1991年。
- 太政官「職務進退・元老院 勅奏任官履歴原書 転免病死ノ部 丸岡莞爾」明治3年。国立公文書館 請求番号：本館-2A-031-09・職00148100 件名番号：077
