= Nishimura Sutezō =

Japanese businessman and politician

- 西村 捨三
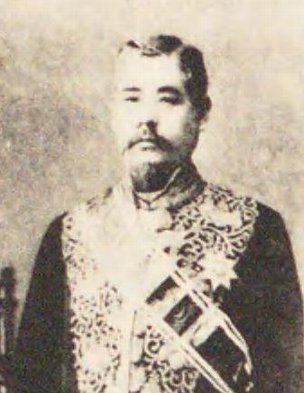

Governor of Osaka Prefecture
- In office 16 March 1889 – 15 June 1891
- Monarch: Meiji
- Preceded by: Tateno Gōzō
- Succeeded by: Yamada Nobumichi

Governor of Okinawa Prefecture
- In office 21 December 1883 – 27 April 1886
- Monarch: Meiji
- Preceded by: Iwamura Michitoshi
- Succeeded by: Ōsako Sadakiyo

Personal details
- Born: 24 August 1843 Inukami, Ōmi, Japan
- Died: 14 January 1908 (aged 64)
- Occupation: Politician

Nishimura Sutezō (西村 捨三; 24 August 1843 – 14 January 1908) was a Japanese businessman and politician. He was a veteran of the Boshin War. He was the fourth Governor of Okinawa Prefecture (1883–1886) and the sixth Governor of Osaka (1889–1891).
