= Narahara Shigeru =

Japanese politician (1834–1918)

Baron Narahara Shigeru
- 奈良原 繁
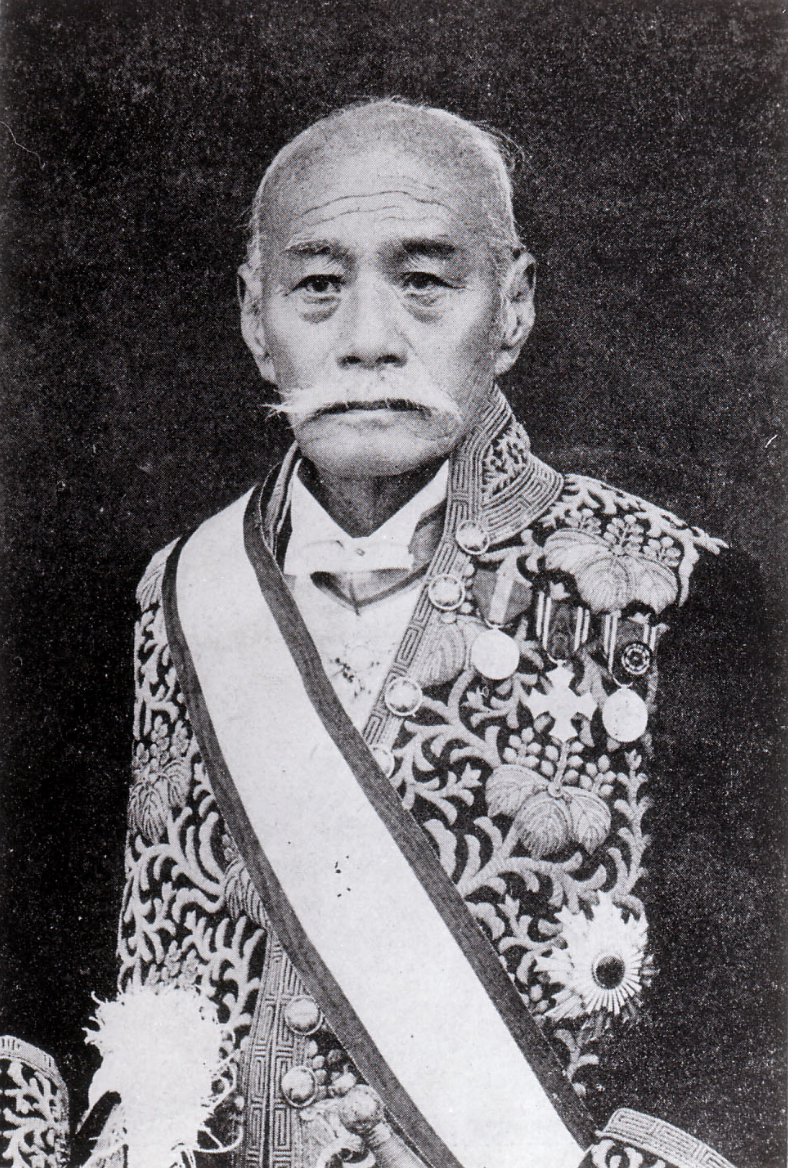

Member of the House of Peers
- In office 10 December 1907 – 13 August 1918 Nominated by the Emperor
- In office 29 September 1890 – 11 May 1892 Nominated by the Emperor

Governor of Okinawa Prefecture
- In office 20 July 1892 – 6 April 1908
- Monarch: Meiji
- Preceded by: Maruoka Kanji
- Succeeded by: Hibi Kimei

Governor of Shizuoka Prefecture
- In office 15 December 1883 – 27 September 1884
- Monarch: Meiji
- Preceded by: Ōsako Sadakiyo
- Succeeded by: Takayoshi Sekiguchi

Personal details
- Born: 29 June 1834 Kagoshima, Satsuma, Japan
- Died: 13 August 1918 (aged 84) Tokyo, Japan
- Occupation: Politician

Baron Narahara Shigeru (奈良原 繁; 29 June 1834 – 13 August 1918), also known as Narahara Kogorō, was a Japanese politician of the Meiji period who served as the eighth governor of Okinawa Prefecture from 1892 to 1908, and in a number of other posts over the course of his career.

A samurai of Satsuma Domain prior to the Meiji Restoration, he played a role in opposing radical elements among his fellows, though he may also have been responsible for the killing of the Englishman Richardson in the 1862 Namamugi Incident, which led to the bombardment of Kagoshima and proved damaging to the Tokugawa shogunate.

== Early life ==
Narahara was born into a samurai family of Satsuma Domain (modern-day Kagoshima Prefecture).

== Career ==
When, in 1862, Lord of Satsuma Shimazu Hisamitsu learned that radical elements among the Satsuma samurai were meeting at the Teradaya Inn in Kyoto and plotting against the shogunate, Narahara was among a number of samurai dispatched to put an end to the plots, suppress the radical movement, and bring the rebel samurai home. The ensuing skirmish, in which a number were killed, has come to be known as the Teradaya Incident.

Another major incident involving samurai of Satsuma occurred several months later, at Namamugi, near Yokohama. In the so-called Namamugi Incident, an Englishman named Richardson was killed, and two men accompanying him seriously wounded, when they failed to dismount and step aside for a group of Satsuma samurai coming the other way down the road. Historian George Kerr claims it was Narahara who killed Richardson. However, other sources indicate that the Narahara Kizaemon often named as having been involved in this incident was in fact Shigeru's brother and not Shigeru himself.

Following the 1868 Meiji Restoration, the shogunate fell, the system of han (feudal domains) was abolished along with the samurai class, and a new "modern" government was established, heavily influenced by Western systems. Narahara, like many former samurai officials, became a politician in this new system, as the administration of Satsuma Domain was reorganized into that of Kagoshima Prefecture. He now filled the role of chief retainer to former daimyō Shimazu Saburō and manager of his affairs.

In January 1872, Narahara and another Kagoshima official, Ijichi Sadaka, led a mission to Shuri, the capital of the Okinawan kingdom of Ryūkyū. The previous year, there had been an incident in which an Okinawan fishing boat crashed on Taiwan; there was a struggle between the Okinawan fishermen and a group of Taiwanese aborigines, which ended in the death of most of the Okinawans. This developed into an international incident, calling into question Chinese and Japanese claims to both Taiwan and the Ryukyu Islands and drawing Tokyo's attention to the threat posed to (the rest of) Japan should China or a Western power seize, colonize, or otherwise exert influence over Ryukyu. Meeting with officials at Shuri, Narahara and Ijichi discussed a number of matters including matters of the kingdom's debts and tax obligations to Kagoshima, exploitation of coal deposits recently discovered on the Yaeyama Islands, and the need for the king of Ryukyu to formally pay his respects to the Emperor of Japan, thus symbolically acknowledging his subordination and that of his kingdom to the Empire of Japan.

Narahara left the Kagoshima administration for Tokyo and entered the Home Ministry in 1878 and, after serving as governor of Shizuoka Prefecture and in other posts for a time, in 1892 he became governor of Okinawa Prefecture.

His term is marked by the end of the "policy of preserving the old customs" (旧慣温存, kyūkan onzon) in Okinawa, or the "'Do Nothing' Era" as historian George H. Kerr dubs it; up until this point, Tokyo's policies towards Okinawa largely focused on maintaining old customs and administrative forms so as to appease local discontent, encourage pro-Japanese attitudes, and avoid feeding pro-Chinese attitudes. Under Narahara, this era of maintenance of the old ways came to an end, and Westernization and modernization efforts which had already been underway in the rest of Japan for several decades began to be undertaken in Okinawa. These efforts chiefly included land reforms, harbor construction, and the implementation of the national system of public education. Extensive administrative reforms, including the redrawing of districts and reorganization of local assemblies, were undertaken to establish modern administrative methods and systems in Okinawa resembling those now in place in the other Japanese prefectures, and the first steps were taken towards Okinawan representation in the National Diet. The establishment of a Temporary Land Readjustment Bureau in 1898, which aimed to convert roughly three-quarters of the total land area of the prefecture, traditionally communal land, into private land subject to modern administration and individual, rather than communal village-level, taxation, is identified by George Kerr as "one of the great turning points in Okinawan history, and the most significant event to take place between the king's abdication in 1879 and the American invasion of 1945"."

Even so, despite extensive reforms and modernization efforts, the prefecture's economic and political situation vis-a-vis Tokyo could be said to have more closely resembled that of a colony than that of an integral part of the home country. Narahara was not popular in Okinawa. He is said to have largely ignored the needs of Okinawan farmers, and to have given preferential treatment to men from his home province of Satsuma (Kagoshima prefecture). A number of movements arose opposing his policies; one was led by prefectural official Jahana Noboru and connected to the Freedom and People's Rights Movement (自由民権運動, jiyū minken undō) active in other parts of the country. Jahana and his compatriots accused Narahara's administration of unfair policies and unjust treatment; the movement was ultimately suppressed by Narahara. Another group of officials and other prominent Okinawans, called the Kōdō-kai (公同会, "Public Unity Association"), sought to reunite the Okinawan people under Okinawan leadership, and called for the replacement of Narahara as governor with the Marquis Shō Tai, who had abdicated as king of the Ryūkyū Kingdom years earlier. Though the Kōdō-kai was not calling for Okinawan independence, and supported an Okinawan administration within the Empire of Japan and subordinate to the government at Tokyo, the central government deemed that giving in to their demands could be seen to reflect an acknowledgment of Japanese misrule or Okinawan dissatisfaction, and could contribute to the debate over sovereignty of the islands. Thus, the movement was quickly crushed.

== Retirement ==
After serving as Governor of Okinawa for 15 years, Narahara was succeeded by his chief assistant, Hibi Kimei, in 1908.

== See also ==
- Mount Narahara

Preceded by Maruoka Kanji	8th Governor of Okinawa; 1892–1907	Succeeded by Hibi Kimei
