= Uesugi Harunori =

9th head of the Yonezawa Domain in Dewa Province, Japan

- 上杉 治憲
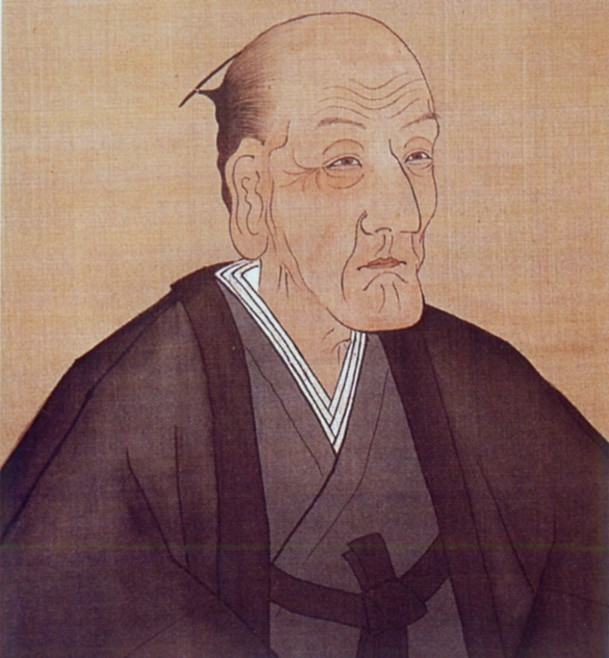
- Uesugi Harunori
- Monarch: Shōgun: Tokugawa Ieharu

9th Daimyō of Yonezawa Domain
- In office 1767–1785
- Preceded by: Uesugi Shigesada
- Succeeded by: Uesugi Haruhiro

Personal details
- Born: September 9, 1751; Edo, Japan
- Died: April 2, 1822 (aged 70)
- Spouse(s): Kō, daughter of Uesugi Shigesada
- Parent: Akizuki Tanemitsu (father)

Uesugi Harunori (上杉 治憲; September 9, 1751 – April 2, 1822) was the 9th daimyō of Yonezawa Domain in Dewa Province, Japan (modern-day Yamagata Prefecture), under the Edo period Tokugawa shogunate of Japan. After retirement, he adopted the gō, or pen name, Yōzan (鷹山). Today, he is best remembered for his financial reforms, and he is often cited as an example of a good governor of a domain.

== Biography ==
Harunori was the younger son of Akizuki Tanemitsu, daimyō of Takanabe Domain in Hyūga Province. His mother was a granddaughter of the fourth daimyō of Yonezawa Domain, Uesugi Tsunanori.His childhood names were "Matsusaburō" (松三郎) and "Naomatsu" (直松). His mother died when he was very young, and he was raised by his grandmother, which strengthened his ties to Yonezawa. At age ten he was adopted by Uesugi Shigesada, then daimyō of Yonezawa, who had a daughter but no male heir. After arriving in Yonezawa, from 1763 he became an ardent disciple of the Neo-Confucian scholar Hosoi Heishu, whose teaching would strongly influence his political philosophy and governing outlook. In 1766, he underwent the genpuku ceremony and received the kanji of "Haru" in his name from Shogun Tokugawa Ieharu as a sign of special favor. In 1767, he became daimyō of Yonezawa.

The domain which he inherited had been deeply in debt for roughly a hundred years when Harunori took over; Shigesada even considered returning the domain to the shogunate as a last resort. However, he was convinced by his father-in-law, the daimyō of Owari Province, to instead resign as daimyō. the amount of the debt exceeded 200,000 ryō, which seemed unsurmountable given that the domain had a nominal kokudaka of only 150,000 koku. Furthermore, the domain had a very high proportion of retainers on its payroll compared with other domains for historic reasons, as the early rulers of Yonezawa had been reluctant to reduce the number of retainers from the time before the domain had been reduced who had served loyally from when the time the domain had exceeded 1,000,000 koku prior to the Battle of Sekigahara. To even add further to the domain's financial woes, during the tenure of Uesugi Shigemori, the domain had been forced by the shogunate to pay for the rebuilding of the temple of Kan'ei-ji in Edo, and had also suffered from severe flooding in 1755. Shigemori refused to cut back on his extravagances due to pride.

Harunori began by imposing stringent fiscal restraints on spending, setting an example by wearing cotton clothes instead of silk and having his meals consist of one bowl of soup and one vegetable. He reduced his living allowance from 1500 ryō per year to 209 ryō and the number of maidservants from 50 to nine. He chose to keep all their retainers but cut all salaries to one-sixth of their former level. Faced with opposition by several of his karō, he ordered their execution. As soon as these efforts started to show results, the domain was then hit with a demand from the Shogunate to rebuild the western bailey of Edo Castle. He had storages of rice built in every village in the domain, and it did not suffer much from the famine which swept Japan in the Tenmei era (1781–1789). Harunori also set policies encouraging new industry such as weaving, pottery and papermaking and encouraged existing enterprises such as paraffin, raw silk and linen. He required every family to plant a certain number of lacquer trees to help establish that industry, and turned many of the domain's samurai into farmers. Education was necessary to create the brilliant men required to enrich the country, and he reopened the han school which had closed down due to financial constraints and invited scholars from Edo to teach. He also established a medical school to teach the latest medical knowledge from Holland. Another policy change ensured adequate water from the mountains for the rice fields by enlisting retainers and samurai to dig irrigation ditches and to repair dikes. Administrative reform and personnel promotion based on merit, not class, eliminated waste and simplified public offices. As a result of these various measures, Yonezawa became fairly prosperous, and by 1823 the entire amount of the debt had been repaid. In 1830, less than a decade after Harunori's death, Yonezawa was officially declared by the shogunate to be a paragon of a well-governed domain.

He revealed his views on governance and the role of a feudal lord in a letter to his son Haruhiro:

The state (国家, kokka) is inherited from one's ancestors and passed on to one's descendants; it should not be administered selfishly.

The people belong to the state; they should not be administered selfishly.

The lord exists for the sake of the state and the people: the state and the people do not exist for the sake of the lord.

Additionally, his views on self-discipline are well known in Japanese culture:

If you put your mind to it, you can do it;

If you do not, you cannot – that is true for all things.
When something cannot be done, you are the one to blame

For not putting your heart into it.

He also created the provision of a childcare allowance for some of the poorest farming families. He also allowed for financial support for those aged 88 and above until their deaths.

Uesugi promoted the consumption of carp as a means of protein. This came when the eating of meat was discouraged and the mountainous inland Yonezawa Domain had a hard time accessing seafood. This lack of nutrients meant that Yonezawa could be particularly hard hit by disease. He instructed farmers and low-ranking samurai to build ponds on their property so as to farm the fish. This promotion lead to an increase in the health of the locality.

== See also ==
- Uesugi clan
