= Mount Narahara =

Mountain in Okinawa Prefecture, Japan

- 奈良原岳
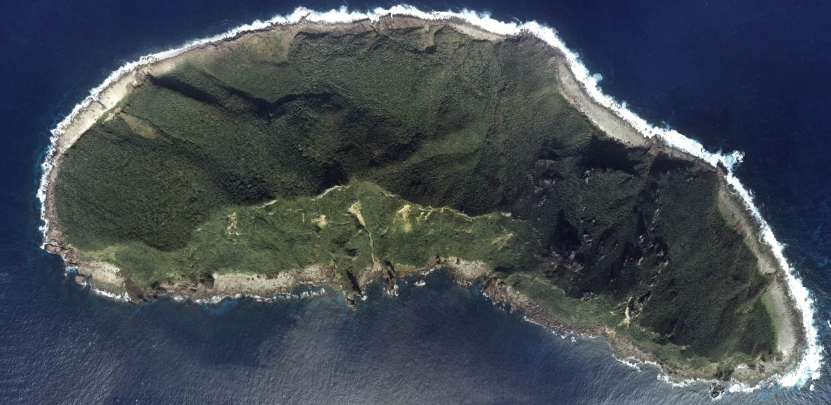
- Mount Narahara on Uotsuri-jima

Highest point
- Elevation: 362 m (1,188 ft)
- Coordinates: 25°44′33″N 123°28′17″E

Geography
- Location within Japan
- Location: Ishigaki, Okinawa Prefecture, Japan

Mount Narahara (奈良原岳, Narahara-dake) is a mountain located on Uotsuri island of Senkaku Islands in Ishigaki, Okinawa, Japan. It is the highest point of the island. It was named after Narahara Shigeru, the eighth governor of Okinawa Prefecture.
