= Yonezawa Domain =

Japanese historical estate in Dewa province

Yonezawa Domain 米沢藩
- under Tokugawa shogunate Japan
- 1601–1871
- Capital: Yonezawa Castle
  - Type: Daimyō
- Historical era: Edo period
  - Established: 1601
  - Disestablished: 1871
- Today part of: part of Yamagata Prefecture

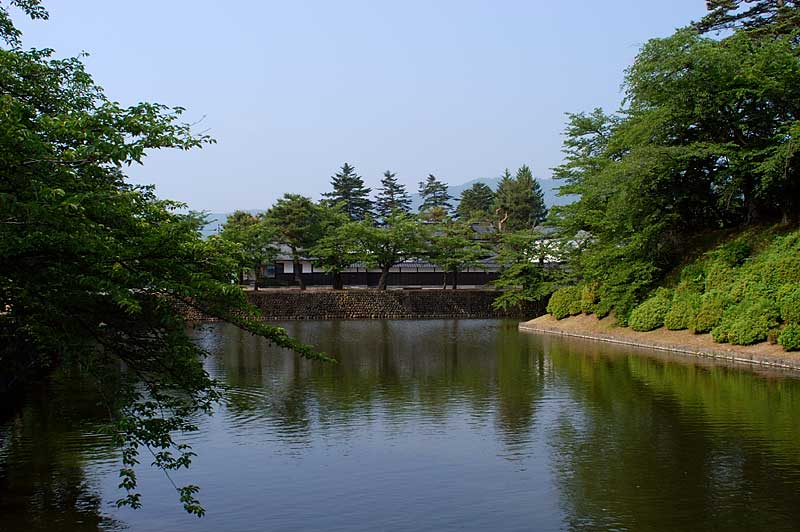
Moats of Yonezawa Castle, administrative center of Yonezawa Domain

Yonezawa Domain (米沢藩, Yonezawa-han) was a feudal domain in Edo period Japan, located in Dewa Province (modern-day Yamagata Prefecture), Japan. It was centered at Yonezawa castle in what is now the city of Yonezawa, and its territory extended over the Okitama District of Dewa Province, in what is today southeastern Yamagata Prefecture. It was ruled throughout its history by the Uesugi clan, as tozama daimyō, with an initial income of 300,000 koku, which later fell to 150,000–180,000. The Uesugi were ranked as a province-holding daimyō (国持ち大名, kunimochi daimyō) and as such, had the privilege of shogunal audiences in the Great Hall (Ōhiroma) of Edo Castle.

The domain shifted from a poor, indebted, and corruptly led domain to a very prosperous one in only a few decades in the 1760s–80s. Yonezawa was declared in 1830 by the shogunate to be the paragon of a well-managed domain. Scholar Mark Ravina used Yonezawa as a case study in analysing the political status and conceptions of statehood and identity in the feudal domains of the Edo period (1603–1868).

== History ==
The region which later became Yonezawa Domain was held by the Date clan for much of the Sengoku period, from 1548 to 1591, when Toyotomi Hideyoshi came to power and declared the Date move to Iwadeyama in Mutsu Province. The Gamō clan were given Aizu to govern under the Uesugi, and Tairō Uesugi Kagekatsu gave his karō (advisor) Naoe Kanetsugu a 300,000 koku income.

In 1600, however, the Uesugi opposed Tokugawa Ieyasu in the Sekigahara Campaign, and lost, becoming tozama daimyō (outsider lords) under the new shogunate. Their income and territory worth 1,200,000 koku was reduced to 300,000, and they were forced to leave their holdings in Aizu, and were allowed to keep only Yonezawa, which they recovered from Naoe Kanetsugu. Their new domain thus consisted of 180,000 koku in Dewa Province, and 120,000 koku in neighboring Mutsu province. This 300,000 koku territory would represent the peak of the Uesugi clan's income during the Tokugawa period.

As with most of the han, Yonezawa acted as a semi-independent state, ruled directly by its daimyō. The Uesugi demanded respect for the shogunate from their retainers, and forbade public criticism, but only imposed and enforced those edicts and policies set by the central authorities which they chose to. Retainers were ordered to obey shogunal laws while outside the domain, but within it, shogunal orders did not apply unless conveyed by the daimyō.

In 1664, the third daimyō of Yonezawa, Uesugi Tsunakatsu, died without producing an heir. The succession was determined at the advice of his father-in-law, Hoshina Masayuki, the younger brother to shōgun Tokugawa Iemitsu. He suggested that the clan adopt Uesugi Tsunanori, the son of Tsunakatsu's younger sister and Kira Yoshinaka as heir, although this would mean splitting the domain in half, down to only the 150,000 koku portion within Dewa province. This decision led to severe financial difficulties in the domain, for the Uesugi and their administration, and for the increasingly impoverished peasants. The problem became so severe that the eighth daimyō, Uesugi Shigetada, seriously considered surrendering the domain to the shogunate. Instead, he resigned his position as daimyō in favor of Uesugi Harunori, who then began to reform the domain's administration and to revive its economy. He introduced strict disciplinary measures, and ordered the execution of several karō who opposed his plans. In order to finance castle repairs imposed upon his domain by the shogunate, Harunori asked his retainers to agree to a reduction of their stipends. As a result of these various measures, Yonezawa again became fairly prosperous, and did not suffer much from the great famine which swept Japan in the Tenmei era (1781–89). In 1830, the shogunate formally declared Yonezawa to be a choice example of a well-governed domain.

The domain had a population of 127,277 people in 23,440 households per the 1870 census. It maintained its primary residence (kamiyashiki) in Edo near the Sakurada-mon gate to Edo Castle. The site is now the head office of the Ministry of Justice (Japan). The domain's secondary residence (shimoyashiki) was in Azabu, and its tertiary residence (nakayashiki) was in Shirogane.

When the Boshin War erupted in 1868, and the shogunate came to an end with the abdication of shōgun Tokugawa Yoshinobu, the Uesugi joined the "Northern Alliance" (Ōuetsu Reppan Dōmei), voicing their support for the embattled Aizu domain and opposing Satsuma and Chōshū domination of the new imperial government, while stating an intent to "reconquer Japan, that the Emperor may indeed reign over it." The Alliance members also acknowledged their debt to Hoshina Masayuki, the first Aizu lord, who was a respected figure in many domains. After several months the Alliance was defeated, and the new Meiji government reduced the domain by 40,000 koku, and its subsidiary domain of "Yonezawa Shinden han" was abolished in 1869. Yonezawa Domain became Yonezawa prefecture with the abolition of the han system as a whole two years later, and was then combined with Okitama prefecture to form Yamagata prefecture.

The final daimyō of Yonezawa, Uesugi Mochinori, was later ennobled with the new kazoku peerage title of hakushaku (Count).

== List of daimyō ==
- Uesugi clan 1601–1871 (tozama)

	Name	Tenure	Courtesy title	Court Rank	revenues
1	Uesugi Kagekatsu (上杉景勝)	1601–1623	Echigo-no-kami (越後守); Chunagon (中納言);	3rd (従三位)	300,000 koku
2	Uesugi Sadakatsu (上杉定勝)	1623–1645	Sakon'e-shōshō (左近衛少将)	Lower 4th (従四位下)	300,000 koku
3	Uesugi Tsunakatsu (上杉綱勝)	1645–1664	Harima-no-kami (播磨守) ); Jijū (侍従)	Lower 4th (従四位下)	300,000 koku
4	Uesugi Tsunanori (上杉綱憲)	1664–1703	Danjō-daihitsu (弾正大弼); Jijū (侍従)	Lower 4th (従四位下)	150,000 koku
5	Uesugi Yoshinori (上杉吉憲)	1703–1722	Minbu-taifu (民部大輔)	Lower 4th (従四位下)	150,000 koku
6	Uesugi Munenori (上杉宗憲)	1722–1734	Danjō-daihitsu (弾正大弼); Jijū (侍従)	Lower 4th (従四位下)	150,000 koku
7	Uesugi Munefusa (上杉宗房)	1734–1746	Minbu-taifu (民部大輔)	Lower 4th (従四位下)	150,000 koku
8	Uesugi Shigesada (上杉重定)	1746–1767	Oi-no-kami (大炊頭 )	Lower 4th (従四位下)	150,000 koku
9	Uesugi Harunori (上杉治憲)	1767–1785	Danjō-daihitsu (弾正大弼); Jijū (侍従)	Lower 4th (従四位下)	150,000 koku
10	Uesugi Haruhiro (上杉治広)	1785–1812	Danjō-daihitsu (弾正大弼); Jijū (侍従)	Lower 4th (従四位下)	150,000 koku
11	Uesugi Narisada (上杉斉定)	1812–1839	Danjō-daihitsu (弾正大弼); Jijū (侍従)	Lower 4th (従四位下)	150,000 koku
12	Uesugi Narinori (上杉斉憲)	1839–1869	Danjō-daihitsu (弾正大弼); Jijū (侍従)	Lower 4th (従四位下)	150,000 → 180,000 koku
13	Uesugi Mochinori (上杉茂憲)	1869–1871	Shikibu-taifu (式部大輔); Jijū (侍従)	2nd (従二位)	180,000 → 147,000 koku

=== Genealogy ===
- Nagao Tamekage (1489–1543)
  - Uesugi Kenshin (1530–1578)
  - Aya-gozen (1524–1609), m. Nagao Masakage (1526–1564)
    - I. Uesugi Kagekatsu, 1st daimyō of Yonezawa (cr. 1601) (1556–1623; r. 1601–1623)
      - II. Sadakatsu, 2nd daimyō of Yonezawa (1604–1645; r. 1623–1645)
        - III. Tsunakatsu, 3rd daimyō of Yonezawa (1639–1664; r. 1645–1664)
        - Umemine-in (Tomiko) (1643–1704), m. Kira Yoshinaka (1641–1703)
          - IV. Tsunanori, 4th daimyō of Yonezawa (1663–1704; r. 1664–1703)
            - V. Yoshinori, 5th daimyō of Yonezawa (1684–1722; r. 1703–1722)
              - VI. Munenori, 6th daimyō of Yonezawa (1714–1734; r. 1722–1734)
              - VII. Munefusa, 7th daimyō of Yonezawa (1718–1787; r. 1734–1746)
              - VIII. Shigesada, 8th daimyō of Yonezawa (1720–1798; r. 1746–1767)
                - Katsuhiro (1760-1807)
                  - XI. Narisada, 11th daimyō of Yonezawa (1788–1839; r. 1812–1839)
                    - XII. Narinori, 12th daimyō of Yonezawa (1820–1889; r. 1839–1869)
                      - XIII. Mochinori, 13th daimyō, 14th family head, 1st Count (1844–1919; daimyō: 1869; Governor: 1869–1871; 14th family head: 1869–1919; Count: 1884)
                        - Noriaki, 2nd Count, 15th family head (1876–1953; 15th family head: 1919-1953; 2nd Count: 1919–1947)
                          - Takanori, 16th family head (1917–1995; 16th family head: 1953–1995)
                            - Kuninori, 17th family head (b. 1943; 17th family head: 1995– )
                              - Hironori (b. 1969)
                - X. Haruhiro, 10th daimyō of Yonezawa (1764–1822; r. 1785–1812)
          - Toyohime, m. Kuroda Nagasada, 4th daimyō of Akizuki (1695–1754)
            - Haruhime, m. Akizuki Tanemitsu, 6th daimyō of Takanabe (1718–1787)
              - IX. Harunori, 9th daimyō of Yonezawa (1751–1822; r. 1767–1785)

== Advisors ==
Famous advisors (karō) of the Yonezawa Domain through the course of the Edo period included Chisaka Takafusa, Irobe Matashirō, and Chisaka Takamasa.

== Secondary domains ==
=== Yonezawa Shinden Domain ===
Yonezawa Shinden Domain (米沢新田藩, Yonezawa Shinden han) was founded in 1719 for Uesugi Katsuchika, the fourth son of Uesugi Tsunanori, the 4th daimyō of Yonezawa Domain, who assigned him 10,000 koku of new rice revenues. The domain continued as a subsidiary of Yonezawa Domain, ruled by a succession of younger sons of the parent house. Following the defeat of Yonezawa Domain in the Boshin War, Yonezawa Shinden Domain was reabsorbed into its parent domain, and its final daimyō, Uesugi Katsumichi was later granted the kazoku peerage title of shishaku (viscount).

- Uesugi clan 1719–1869 (tozama)

	Name	Tenure	Courtesy title	Court Rank	kokudaka
1	Uesugi Katsuchika (上杉勝周)	1719–1749	Suruga-no-kami (駿河守)	Lower 5th (従五位下)	10,000 koku
2	Uesugi Katsuyoshi (上杉勝承)	1749–1785	Suruga-no-kami (駿河守)	Lower 5th (従五位下)	10,000 koku
3	Uesugi Katsusada (上杉勝定)	1785–1815	Suruga-no-kami (駿河守)	Lower 5th (従五位下)	10,000 koku
4	Uesugi Katsuyoshi (上杉勝義)	1815–1842	Suruga-no-kami (駿河守)	Lower 5th (従五位下)	10,000 koku
5	Uesugi Katsumichi (上杉勝道)	1842–1869	Sado-no-kami (佐渡守)	Lower 5th (従五位下)	10,000 koku
