= Nagayama Takeshirō =

- 永山 武四郎
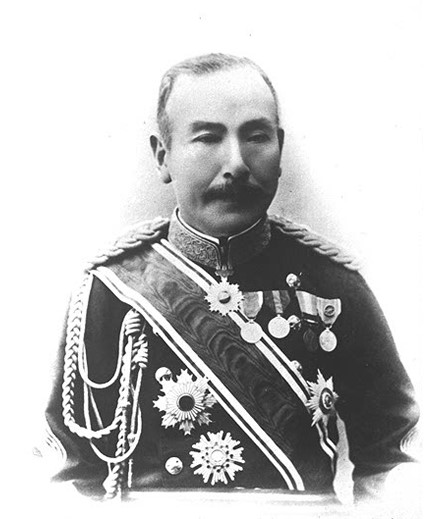
- Born: May 28, 1837
- Died: May 27, 1904 (aged 66)

Nagayama Takeshirō (永山 武四郎; May 28, 1837 – May 27, 1904) was the second Director of Hokkaidō Agency (1888-1891). He was a veteran of the Boshin War and the Satsuma Rebellion.
