= Christian Polak =

French businessman and author (born 1950)

Christian Philippe Polak (born August 1950) is a French businessman and author who has published several books on 19th-century Franco-Japanese relations; one Le Monde book review called him "the best specialist on this question".

== Career ==
Born in Nogaro, Polak graduated from the Department of Japanese studies at INALCO, Paris, in 1971. The same year, he entered Waseda University's Institute of Language and Education as a foreign exchange student. In 1973, he entered the Law Department at Hitotsubashi University, and in 1980 completed his doctorate in law, writing his doctoral thesis on diplomatic relations between France and Japan from 1914 to 1925.

After completing his doctoral studies, Polak attempted to obtain a position at a Japanese university, but, according to one source, the then-Japanese government "denied such a possibility to foreigners" despite various demonstrations and petitions. Polak abandoned his academic ambitions, and in 1981 founded in Tokyo the Société d’Etudes et de Recherches Industrielles et Commerciales (K.K. SERIC), providing advice and support to foreign businesses in areas of metallurgy, aeronautics, automobiles, and the environment. In 1990, Polak founded SERIC S.A., a Paris-based consulting company specializing in Franco-Japanese partnerships.

Polak has continued academic and research activities in parallel to his business career. He has been a visiting research fellow at Hitotsubashi University, a law lecturer at Chuo University's Law Department, and a researcher at the Maison Franco-Japonaise. With Tomohiko Taniguchi, the Deputy Press Secretary to Japan's Ministry of Foreign Affairs, Polak contributed lead essays to the July 2003 Gaiko Forum, a foreign-affairs journal published by Toshi Shuppan.

Polak is also President of the Franco-Japanese Association of Kanagawa, and was nominated by the French government as "consultant for the foreign trade of France" in 2002. He received the Medal of the Ordre national du Mérite (Chevalier class on 29 September 1989, and Officer class on 30 April 2002).

- Order of the Rising Sun, Gold Rays with Rosette (2023)

== Books ==
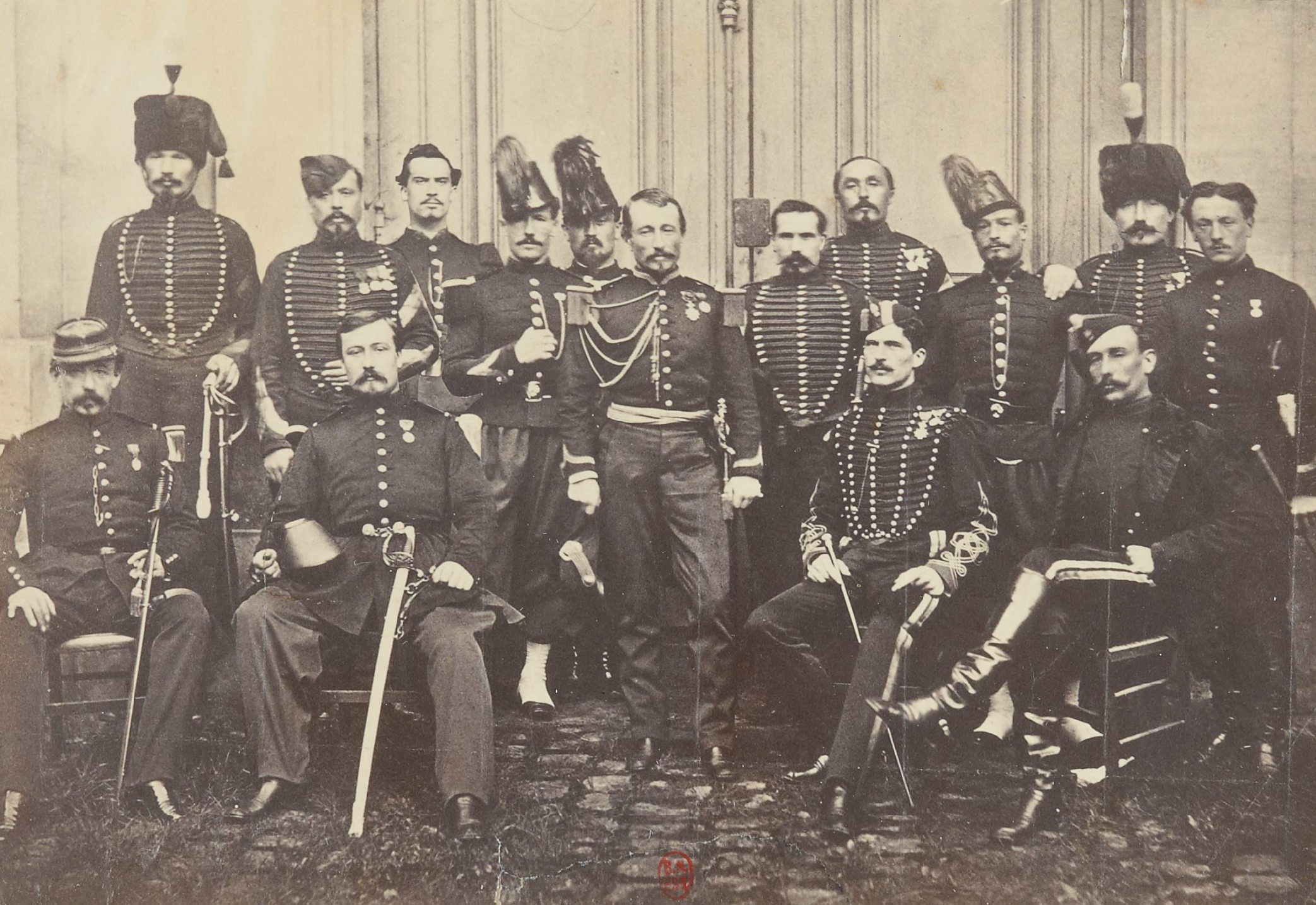
Polak wrote extensively on the French military missions to Japan (shown, the first such mission (1867–1868)).

Writing in the foreword to Polak's book, Hiroshi Ueki, former director of Japan's Agency for Cultural Affairs, called Polak "a recognized historian of Franco-Japanese relations as well as an accomplished businessman." Polak has written several books on the interaction between France and Japan from the Bakumatsu period around 1858, when both countries opened diplomatic relations. The art book Soie et Lumieres (2001) described the interaction between Japan's silk trade and France's exports of technology, and Sabre et Pinceau (2005) the military and artistic relations of the two countries.

"Lavishly illustrated with reproductions of woodblock prints, old photographs, and previously unpublished documents of the period, [Soie et Lumieres] covers a little-known subject: the role of France in the modernization of Japan since the beginning of the 19th century .... The best specialist on this question, Christian Polak knows how to revive a forgotten epoch.

— Philippe Pons, le Monde

Polak has been published on French military missions to Japan of the late 19th and early 20th centuries (1867–1868, 1872–1880, 1884–1889, and 1918–1919). He was sought for comment due to his work on the life of French adventurer Jules Brunet, an inspiration for the movie The Last Samurai.

He has also written on the involvement of various French engineers and traders in the Europeanization of Japan during the Meiji period, such as Emile Bertin and Léonce Verny. His collaboration with Soichiro Honda on Honda's autobiography was noted for its coverage of Honda's battles with Japan's Ministry of International Trade and Industry over the introduction of the kei car into the Japanese automobile industry.

Polak has written on artists who played a role in Franco-Japanese relations, such as in his book on painter Paul Jacoulet. Tai Kawabata, a Japan Times staff writer, calls him a Jacoulet expert.

According to the Monthly Letter of the French Chamber of Commerce in Japan:

"In parallel to his professional activities, Christian Polak cultivates his taste and his knowledge of History, as a teacher and a researcher. His assiduous studies gave birth to two sublime books of art, Soie et lumiere and Sabre et pinceau. Thanks to these works, people with amazing destinies find the light again, such as Jules Brunet: this officer, member of the French military mission sent to Japan as an artillery instructor, joined, after the defeat of the shōgun, the rebellion against Imperial troops, serving as an inspiration for the hero of the Last Samurai."

— Monthly Letter of the French Chamber of Commerce in Japan, p. 9 "Diner des sempais en compagnie de M.Christian Polak.

== Publications ==
- de Beaucé, Thierry, with contributions by Christian Polak and Tōru Araki (1980). ジャポニチュード フランスの知性が見た《日本の深層構造》 (Île absolue) (in Japanese). OCLC 68207108.
- Honda, Sōichirō, with the collaboration of Thierry de Beaucé, and Christian Polak (1979). Honda par Honda (in French). Paris: Stock (publishing house). ISBN 2-234-01060-8. OCLC 21285378.
- Jacoulet, Paul, Kiyoko Sawatari, Christian Polak, and Yokohama Bijutsukan (2003). Paul Jacoulet: créature d'ukiyo-e, couleurs de rêve arc-en-ciel. ポール・ジャクレー (Pōru Jakurē ten: saikō no yume o tsumuida Furansujin yukioeshi). Yokohama: Yokohama Bijutsukan (Yokohama Museum of Art), Tankosha Publishing. ISBN 4-473-01992-6. OCLC 54397718.
- Okada, Shinichi, Akira Tanaka, Christian Polak, Konno Tetsuya and Amibuchi Kenjo (1988). End of the Bakufu and Restoration in Hakodate (in Japanese). 函館の幕末・維新 フランス士官ブリュネのスケッチ 100 枚. Chuo Kouronsha. ISBN 4-12-001699-4.
- Polak, Christian (1977). "L'abbé Mermet de Cachon et l'aube des relations franco-japonaises (summary of presentation given at conference)". Transactions of the International Conference of Orientalists in Japan. Tōhō Gakkai (Institute of Eastern Culture).
- Polak, Christian (1979). "The Washington Conference and the French-Japanese relations (summary of presentation given at conference)". Transactions of the International Conference of Orientalists in Japan. Tōhō Gakkai (Institute of Eastern Culture).
- Polak, Christian (2001–2002). Silk and light: the unknown 100 years history of France-Japan relations (Soie et Lumieres: L'Age d'or des échanges franco-japonais (des origines aux années 1950)) (in French and Japanese). 絹と光: 知られざる日仏交流 100 年の歴史 (江戸時代 ~1950 年代) (Kinu to hikari: shirarezaru Nichi-Futsu kōryū 100-nen no rekishi (Edo jidai-1950-nendai)), also 日仏交流の黄金期 (Shohan ed.). Chambre de Commerce et d'Industrie Française du Japon, Hachette Fujingaho, Hachette Fujin Gahōsha (アシェット婦人画報社). ISBN 4-573-06210-6. OCLC 50875162.
- Polak, Christian (2005). Sabre et Pinceau: Par d'autres Français au Japon. 1872-1960 (in French and Japanese). Hiroshi Ueki (植木 浩), Philippe Pons, foreword; 筆と刀・日本の中のもうひとつのフランス (1872-1960). Chambre de Commerce et d'Industrie Française du Japon, Hachette Fujingaho.
- Polak, Christian and al. The French story of Yokohama: French Diplomacy and Yokohama. 横浜フランス物語・フランスの外交と横浜. Industrial Technology center (産業技術センター刊).
- Polak, Christian; Sylvain Belmondo (2006). Japan R&D Policies and Programs in the Aeronautic and Space Sectors (PDF). SERIC. Archived from the original (PDF) on 8 October 2006.
- Polak, Christian; Taniguchi, Tomohiko (July 2003). "Lead Essays". Gaiko Forum. 180. Toshi Shuppan.

== See also ==
- France–Japan relations (19th century)
