= Bavarian Model 1842 Musket =

- Type: Musket
- Place of origin: Kingdom of Bavaria

Service history
- Used by: Royal Bavarian Army, Union Army, Tokugawa Shogunate Forces
- Wars: American Civil War, Boshin War

Production history
- Produced: 1842–1858

Specifications
- Action: Percussion lock
- Feed system: Muzzle-loaded

The Bavarian Model 1842 (also referred to as the Bavarian M1842 Rifled Musket) was a 19th century Bavarian musket originally designed for the Bavarian Army. The musket was exported for foreign service, and saw limited use during the American Civil War and the Boshin War.

== History ==
The inception and spread of percussion cap capable weapons in the years following the Napoleonic Wars had a large impact on European firearm design. Unlike earlier matchlock or flintlock ignition systems, percussion caps fed by a percussion lock greatly reduced the danger of weapon misfires. This advantage led the state of Bavaria to launch a firearms modernization program that intended to provide the Bavarian Army with a musket capable of utilizing the percussion cap. This program, begun in 1839, resulted in what would become the Bavarian Model 1842 Musket (M1842.) The weapon was put into production at the Royal Bavarian Rifle Factory in Amberg and adopted into Bavarian service. Following the invention of the Minié ball, the M1842 was rifled with five groves to better accommodate the French ammunition. The Bavarian army retired the M1842 after adopting a new rifle in 1858.

=== Union Army service ===
The Union Army purchased a number surplus Bavarian M1842 for usage during the American Civil War. Of the Bavarian equipment offered to the United States for purchase, the M1842 was evaluated as the only weapon of sufficient quality for Union usage. An unknown number of the weapons were sold to the Union, with sources referencing around 3000 muskets being sold as surplus by the US government in 1865 after the conclusion of the Civil War.

=== Boshin War ===
The Bavarian M1842 was imported along other smoothbore guns and rifles to Japan in the 1840s. The weapon was very popular in Japan during the Boshin War and was used by the Shogunate-aligned Aizu clan.
