= Tokyojin =

Japanese magazine

Tokyojin (東京人, Tōkyōjin) is a Japanese-language monthly magazine about the history and culture of Tokyo, and culture and leisure in the city. The title is a little-used term, almost a neologism, for somebody from, in or of Tokyo.

== History and profile ==
The first issue of Tokyojin was published in January 1986. Until the June 2001 issue it was published by the Tokyo Metropolitan Foundation for History and Culture (東京都歴史文化財団, Tōkyō-to Rekishi Bunka Zaidan). The non-profit, non-commercial backing meant that the magazine stayed independent of the preoccupation with shopping and other consumption shared by the huge majority of Japanese magazines, and Tokyojin could concentrate on substantive issues of urban design and so forth.

From July 2001 the magazine was published by Toshi-Shuppan (都市出版), a commercial publisher; it has increasingly moved in the direction of a guide to culture, leisure and eating out in Tokyo for the middle-aged and retired, although it still has plenty of material of substance, and also of interest to other demographics.

In early 2007, its advisory editors were Saburō Kawamoto, Hidenobu Jinnai, and Mayumi Mori. The March 2007 issue, as an example, is a special issue titled "Edo Yoshiwara", about the Yoshiwara entertainment area of Edo: of the total of 162 pages (rather few of which are devoted to advertising, either overt or, as is common in Japanese magazines, covert), seventy-six pages are devoted to Yoshiwara. The contributors include Shōichi Ozawa and Makoto Takeuchi; features include a six-page interview with a very active and alert eighty-eight-year old geisha.
