= Sakai incident =

1868 killing of French sailors by samurai in Japan

Sakai incident 堺事件
- Part of Bakumatsu period
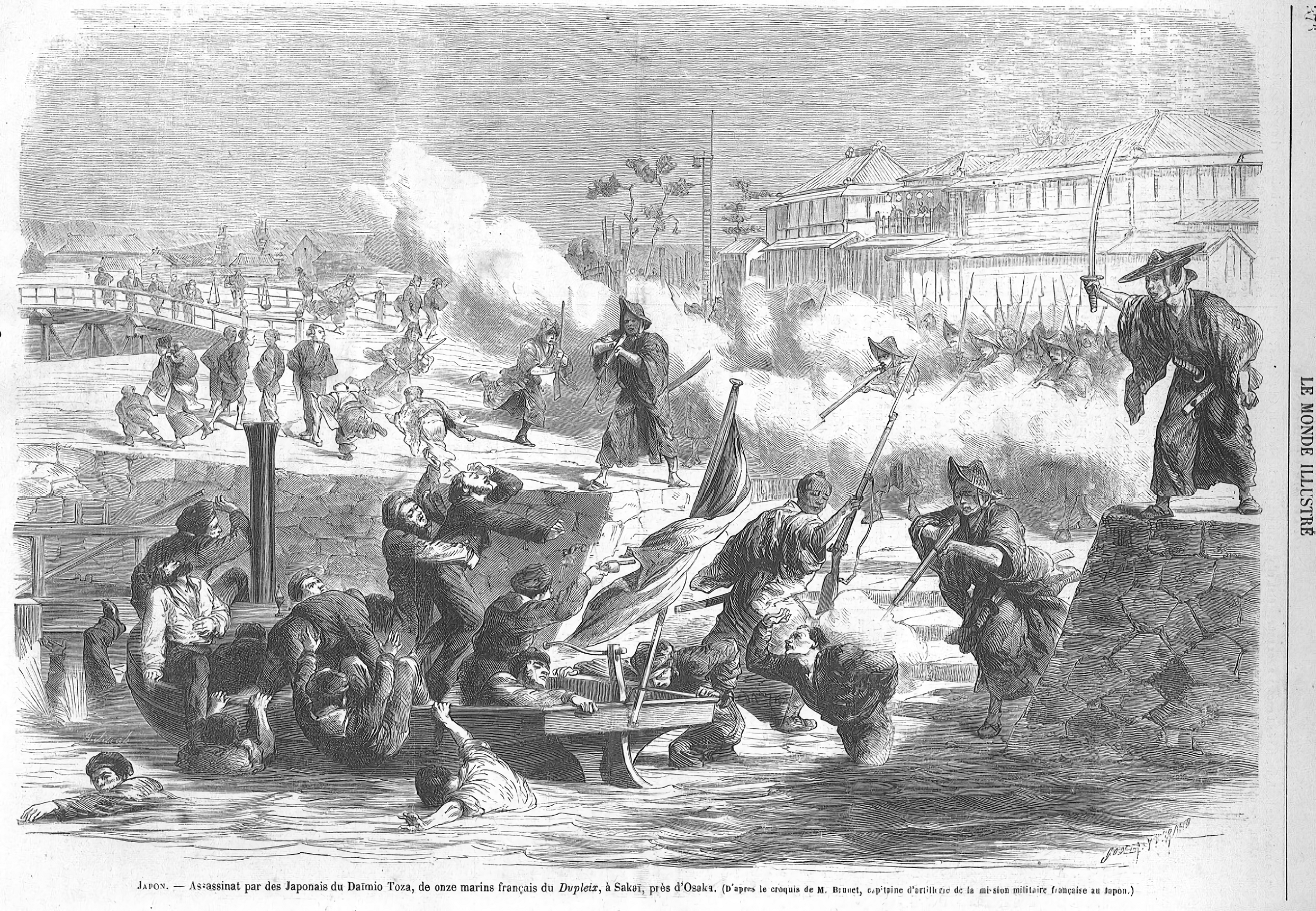
- Sakai incident, Japan. Le Monde Illustré, 1868
Date	March 8–18, 1868
Location	Sakai, Izumi Province, Japan 34°34′53″N 135°28′54″E
Result	Japanese reparations to France

Belligerents
(Second French Empire) France	Empire of Japan

Casualties and losses
11 dead	11 executed
- Location within Osaka Prefecture Sakai incident (Japan)

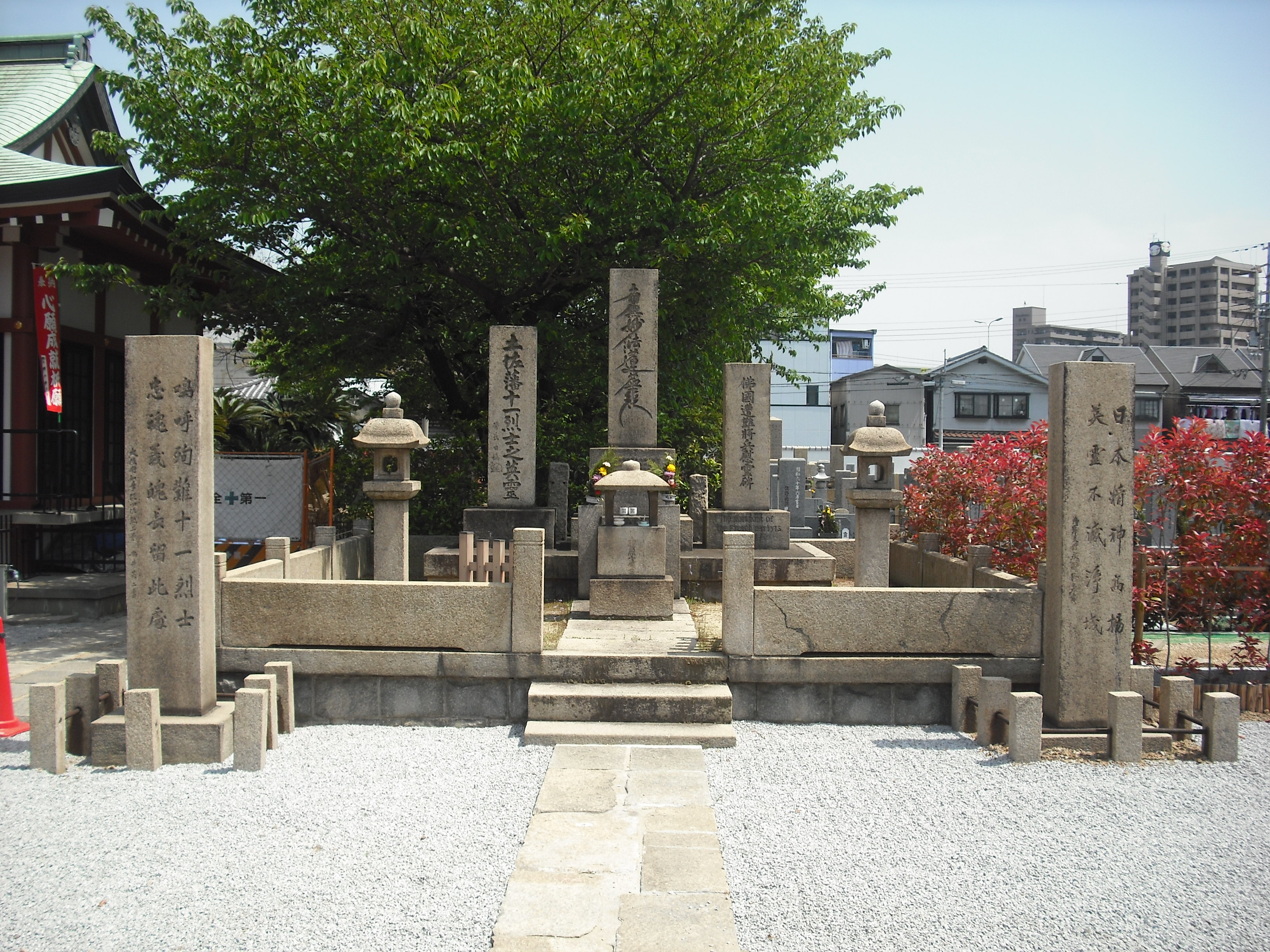
Monument to the Tosa samurai at Myōkoku-ji in Sakai

The Sakai incident (堺事件, Sakai Jiken) was a diplomatic incident that occurred on March 8, 1868, in Bakumatsu period Japan involving the deaths of eleven French sailors from the French corvette Dupleix in the port of Sakai near Osaka, Japan. It is also known as the Senshū Sakai incident (泉州堺事件) or the Myōkoku-ji incident (妙国寺事件), and was one of three major diplomatic incidents involving attacks on foreigners in Japan in 1868, the others being the Kobe Incident and the attempted assassination of Harry Parkes.

== Overview ==
Following the Battle of Toba-Fushimi in the Boshin War, Tosa Domain's 6th Division under the command of Miura Inokichi Motoaki was sent by the new Meiji government to garrison the port of Sakai in Izumi Province, which had until that time been under the control of the Tokugawa shogunate's Osaka machi-bugyō. Miura was aware of the events of the recent "Kōbe Incident" involving two French sailors and samurai of Bizen Domain, which had resulted in the execution of the local Japanese commander. He was also aware of French diplomatic and military support for the former Tokugawa shogunate.

The commander of the French Far-Eastern Fleet Commodore Gustave Ohier was ordered by French consul general Léon Roches to survey the shallows of Osaka Bay, as in January 1868 American admiral Henry H. Bell had drowned when his launch capsized en route to the city of Osaka. Afterwards, the 20 skiffs dispatched from the Dupleix landed at Sakai, discharging some 100 sailors for shore leave.

Complaints soon reached the ears of the Tōsa samurai responsible for security that the sailors had become unruly, intruding into temples and homes without invitation, harassing women, and frightening the merchants. One of the French sailors stole a regimental banner from a Tosa samurai, which was considered a grave insult. He was chased and beaten, with the Tōsa samurai recovering the banner, but this resulted in an all-out melee. It was reported the French opened fire first, and then the Japanese returned fire in retaliation. As a result, nine sailors and a midshipman named Guillou were killed, with two more sailors dying of their injuries the following day. All were in their 20s. The French casualties were buried at the Kobe Foreign Settlement, with Roches, British consul Harry Parkes and the Dutch minister in Osaka in attendance, and a monument was later erected to their memory near the Sannomiya Shrine in Kobe.

Word of the incident quickly reached Kyoto, where the retired daimyō of Tosa, Yamauchi Toyoshige, asked the British minister, Bertram Mitford (who happened to be staying at the Tosa clan's residence in Kyoto), to mediate with the French and to reassure them that the persons responsible would be punished. However, due to strong protests by the French captain Abel-Nicolas Bergasse du Petit-Thouars, Roches made a strong ultimatum to the Japanese government with five demands:

1. Decapitation of the commander of the Tosa samurai and his men who were involved in the clash at the location where the clash took place
2. Payment of 150,000 dollars indemnity by Tosa Domain
3. A formal apology to be made by an imperial prince of Japan aboard a French warship
4. A formal apology in person by the daimyō of Tosa to the French consul
5. A rule forbidding Tosa samurai from bearing weapons in any port open to foreigners.

At that time, the Western powers had numerous warships in Osaka Bay in connection with the unsettled political condition in Japan and the recent opening of Hyōgo port to foreign commerce, whereas the fledgling Meiji government had the bulk of its military forces hundreds of kilometers away in the Kantō region due to the ongoing Boshin War. The Meiji government turned to Parkes hoping that he could help mediate the French demands, but Parkes was not sympathetic.

On March 16, Miura, his deputy Nishimura Sahei and 28 men were sentenced to death by seppuku. However, fearing that executing all troop members would further inflame anti-foreign sentiment, Iwakura Tomomi, Sanjō Sanetomi and others instructed the foreign secretariat judge, Godai Tomoatsu to negotiate with the French to reduce the number to the four senior commanders and 16 ordinary troops. The French agreed, and the 16 ordinary troops were selected by drawing lots. The grounds of the temple of Myōkoku-ji was selected as the location, and in front of a French delegation the samurai cut open their abdomens and allowed their intestines to flow, one after another, to the shock of the French who were observing. After 11 men performed their own execution (which matched the number of French killed), the French captain announced that he was satisfied. Quoting the Moniteur, the London Morning Post described the executions:

On the 15th [a Japanese] high functionary brought a written reply from his Government conceding all the satisfaction required. On the following day Captain du Petit-Thouars, commander of the Dupleix, landed at Sakai to witness the execution of two officers, a subaltern, and 17 Japanese soldiers, condemned to death as the principal authors of the aggression. The two chiefs were the first put to death, after which nine others perished successively. Captain du Petit-Thouars then seeing that the Japanese Government was decided on carrying out its engagements to the end, and ceding to a feeling of humanity, stayed the execution, declaring that he considered the reparation sufficient, and that he proposed to ask the Minister of France to intercede for a commutation of punishment in favour of the other condemned.

This incident was dramatised in a short story, "Sakai Jiken", by Mori Ōgai.

On March 17, Prince Yamashina Akira, together with Date Munenari, went aboard the French flagship Venice, formally apologized to Roches and extended an invitation to an audience with Emperor Meiji. The following day, on March 18, Yamauchi Toyonori also boarded Venice and apologized to Roches and others. The nine Tōsa samurai who escaped execution were sent to Kumamoto Domain or Hiroshima Domain and were later pardoned. The eleven men who were executed were buried at the temple of Hōshū-in, just north of Myōkoku-ji and Yamauchi Toyoshige had a cenotaph erected in their memory. In 1938, the site was designated as a National Historic Site by the Japanese government. It is located about a 15-minute walk from Sakai Station on the Nankai Electric Railway Nankai Main Line.

== See also ==
- Franco-Japanese relations
- List of Historic Sites of Japan (Osaka)
