= Myōkoku-ji =

Buddhist Temple in Sakai, Osaka Prefecture, Japan

Coordinates: 34°34′52.31″N 135°28′52.97″E

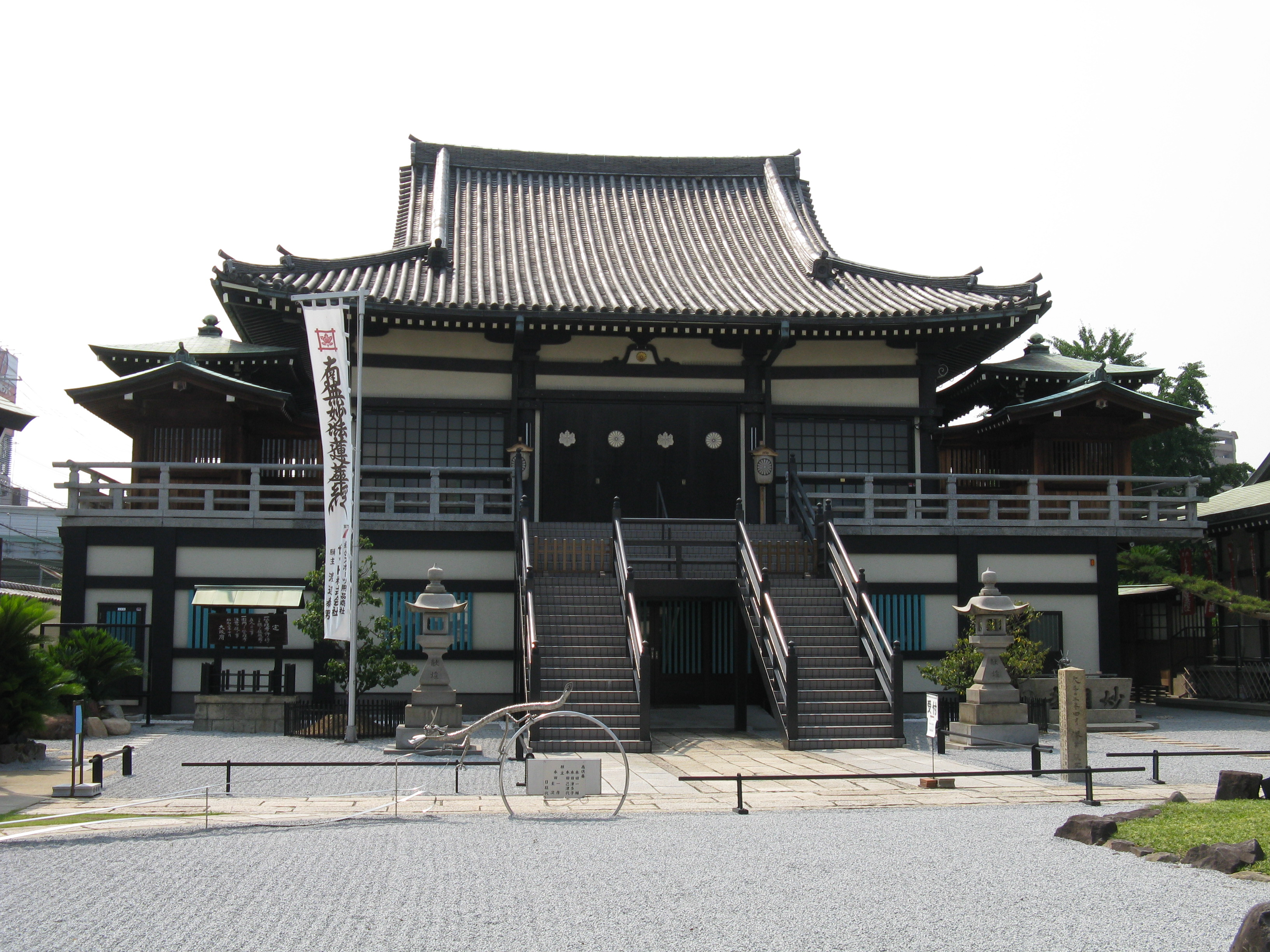
The main building of Myokoku-ji

Map

Myōkoku-ji (妙国寺) is a Buddhist temple in Sakai, Osaka Prefecture, Japan and one of head temples of the Nichiren Sect. It is known as the location of the 1868 Sakai incident.

== History ==
Myōkokuji Temple (109m by 182m) was established by Nichiko Shonin in 1592 and has been rebuilt several times since then. When Osaka Castle was burnt down in 1615 during the Summer War of Osaka, Toyotomi forces also burnt down Myokokuji Temple because they had heard that their enemy, Ieyasu Tokugawa, was hiding inside. The buildings of Myōkokuji were rebuilt in 1628, but were again destroyed in World War II in July 1945. In autumn of 1973 the present buildings were built again for the third time.

=== Sacred Tree: The Great Cycad ===
The cycad tree in the temple is over 1,100 years old and is well known for its mysterious history. Oda Nobunaga, a major daimyō during the Sengoku era who tried to unite Japan in 1580, transplanted this cycad to Azuchi Castle in what is now Shiga prefecture. However, every night a strange voice was heard in Azuchi Castle saying "Take me back to Myōkokuji", and an unnatural atmosphere covered the castle and disturbed the people there. This angered Nobunaga and he let his men cut the tree down. The tree is said to have bled from the blows, fainted from the pain and looked so much like a great snake that even brave Nobunaga became afraid and sent the tree back to Myokokuji. Upon receiving the dying cycad Nichiko Shonin felt sorry for the tree and recited 1000 Hokkekyo (sutras) for it. A god with a face of a man and a body of a snake appeared in his dream saying "Thank you for your prayers. In return, I will swear three oaths. First, I will ease the pain of childbirth. Second, I will free those from the tragedy of hardship. Third, I will give happiness to those who are poor." Shonin named this guardian god of the temple Ugatoku-ryujin and built a hall on the location. On December 13, 1923 the tree became a national natural monument.

=== Sakai Incident ===
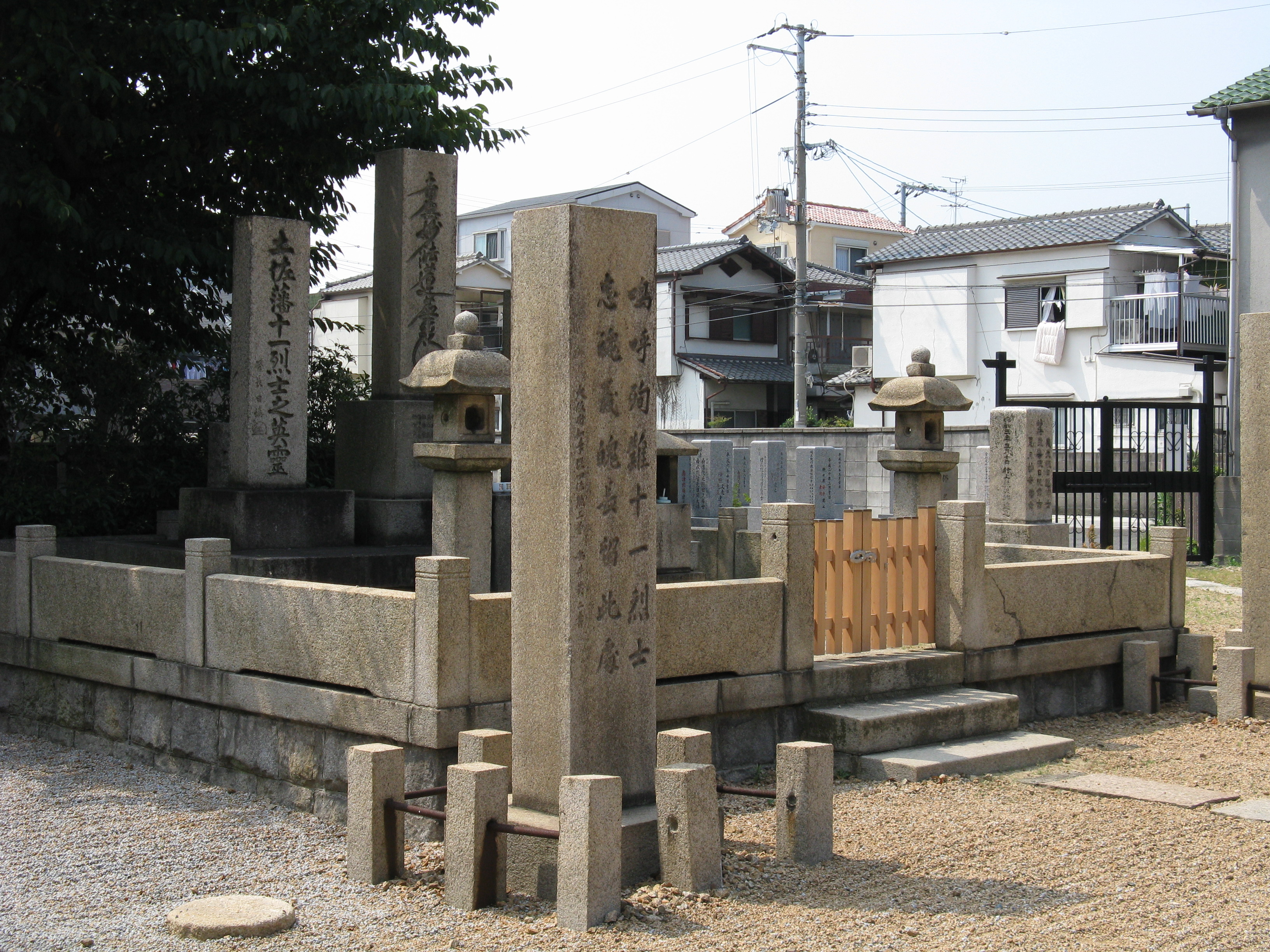
The monument to pray for eleven people

On February 15, Keiō 4, (March 8, 1868) around 100 sailors from a French warship offshore boarded boats and landed at Sakai Port. They came into Sakai for sightseeing and loitered inside temples and shrines and scared women and children who were astonished by the foreigners. The guardians of Myōkoku temple from the Tosa clan sought out the French sailors, but were unable to resolve the problem because of mass confusion and the inability to understand each other's language. When the French sailors took a flag from the Tosa clan, the samurai opened fire, killing thirteen. The French returned fire and retreated to their boat and this incident became an international problem. France pressed Japan for compensation and Japan was forced to pay a large sum of money and twenty samurai involved in the incident were ordered to commit seppuku. On February 23 in front of Myōkoku temple with witnesses from both countries present the samurai began to cut their stomachs open. The sun had already set by the time eleven samurai had committed seppuku. The French witnesses hastily left the temple and the remaining nine samurai were ordered to stop seppuku and were later exiled back to Tosa (Kochi Prefecture) by the government. Like many other samurai, these Tosa samurai died in service of their country. However, because Myōkoku temple is a designated temple by Imperial Order, the burial of the samurai was not permitted on Myōkoku temple grounds. Their remains are kept at the nearby Hojuin Temple.

== See also ==
- Sakai incident
- Geographic data related to Myōkoku-ji at OpenStreetMap
