= Le Monde illustré =

19th-20th century French periodical

Le Monde illustré (title translation: The Illustrated World) was a leading illustrated news magazine in France which was published from 1857–1940 and again from 1945 to 1956. It was in many ways similar to its contemporary English-language newsmagazine The Illustrated London News and should not be confused with the French newspaper Le Monde.

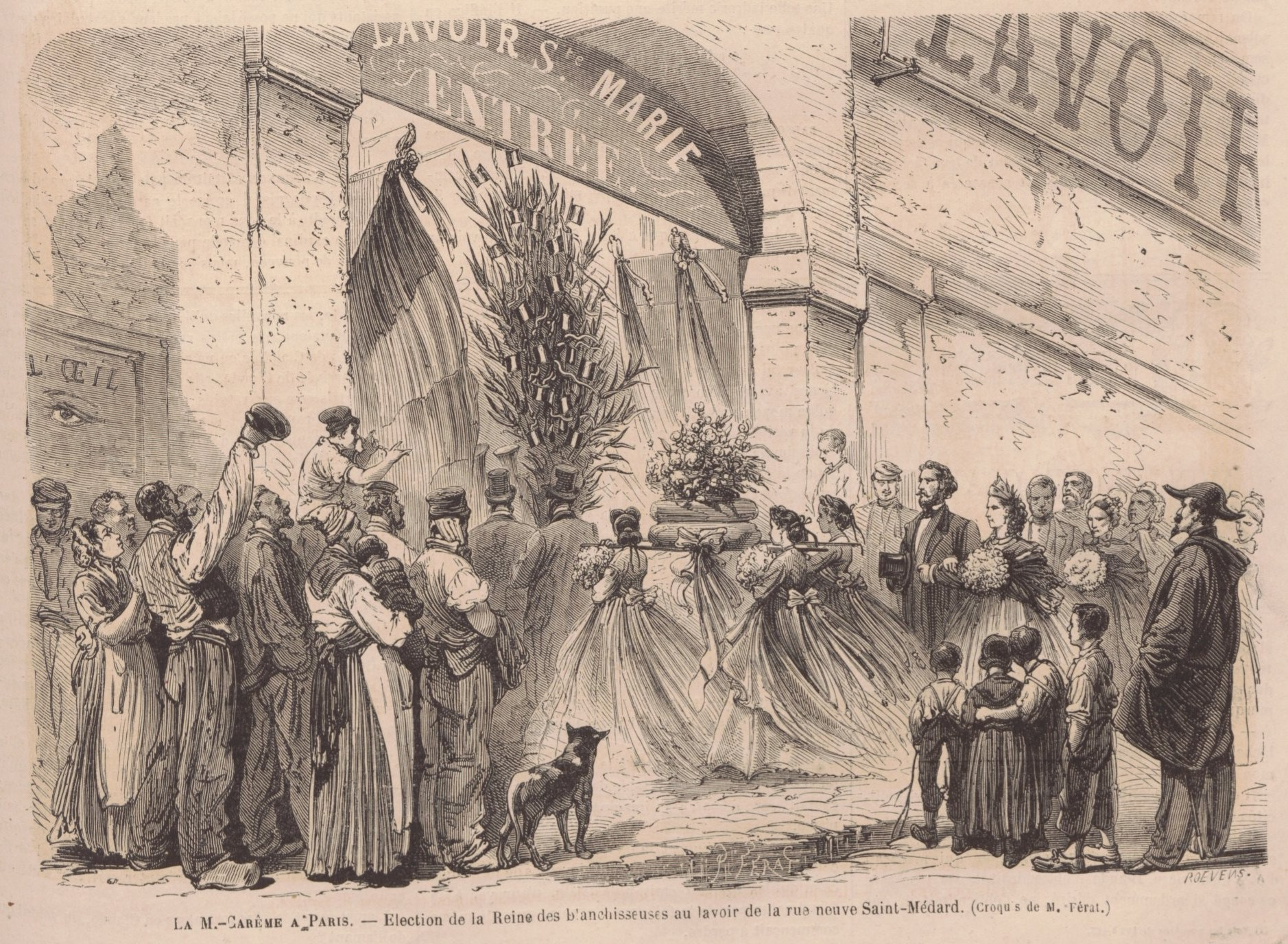
Election de la Reine des Blanchisseuses au lavoir de la rue neuve Saint-Médard, Jules Férat, 1866.

== History and profile ==
Le Monde illustré was established in 1857. Many of the highly realistic prints published in the medium of wood-engraving were actually made from photographs (through intermediary drawings), at a time when photographic reproduction in print was not technically feasible until the late nineteenth century.

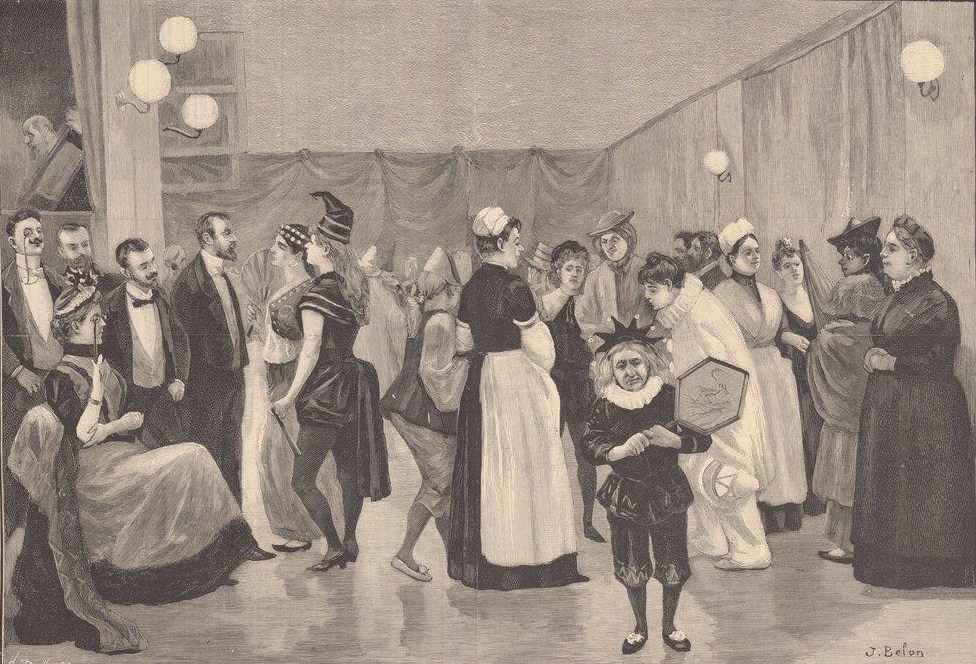
Bal des folles 22 March 1890, José Belon

== Wood-engravings ==
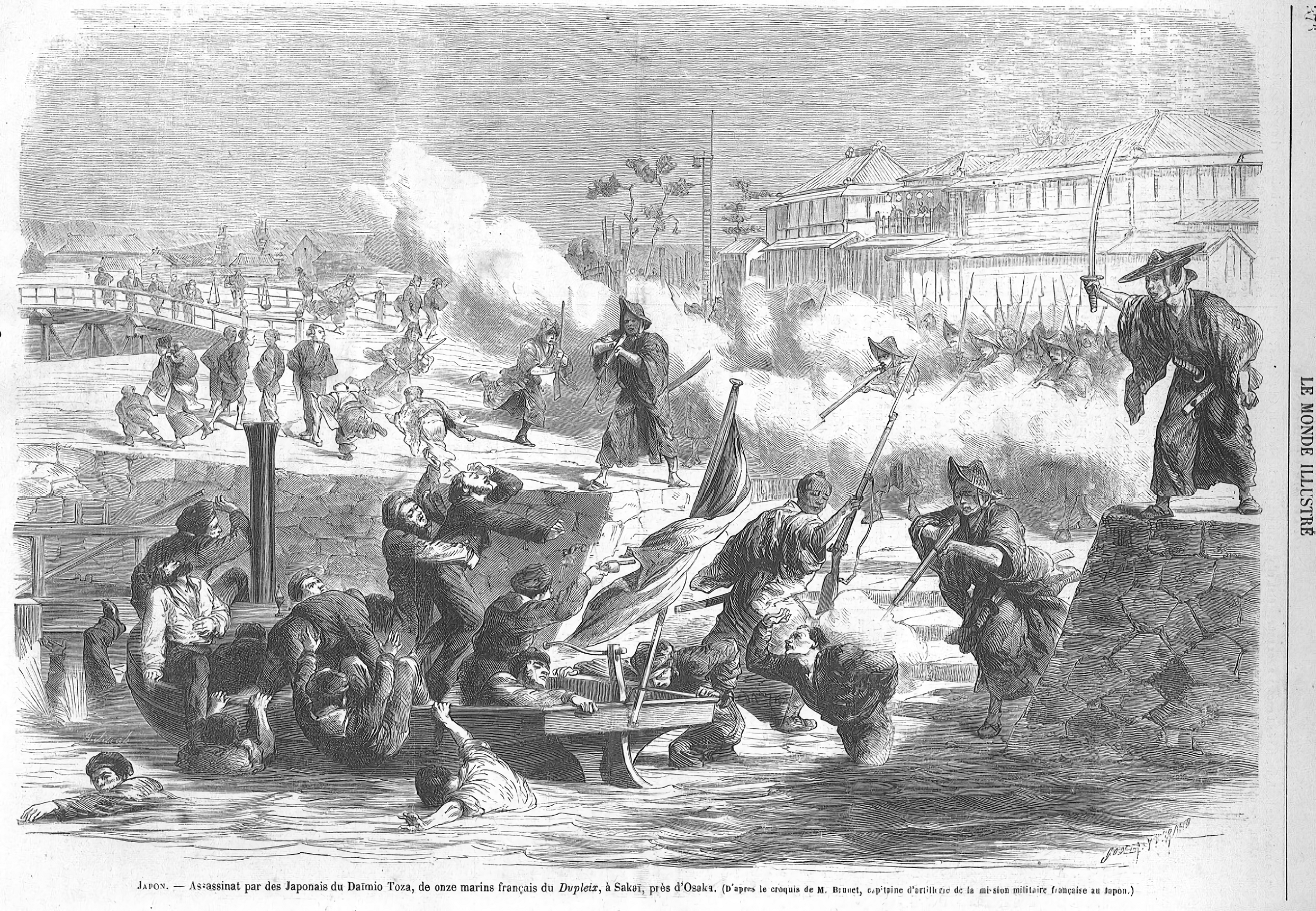
Sakai incident, 1868

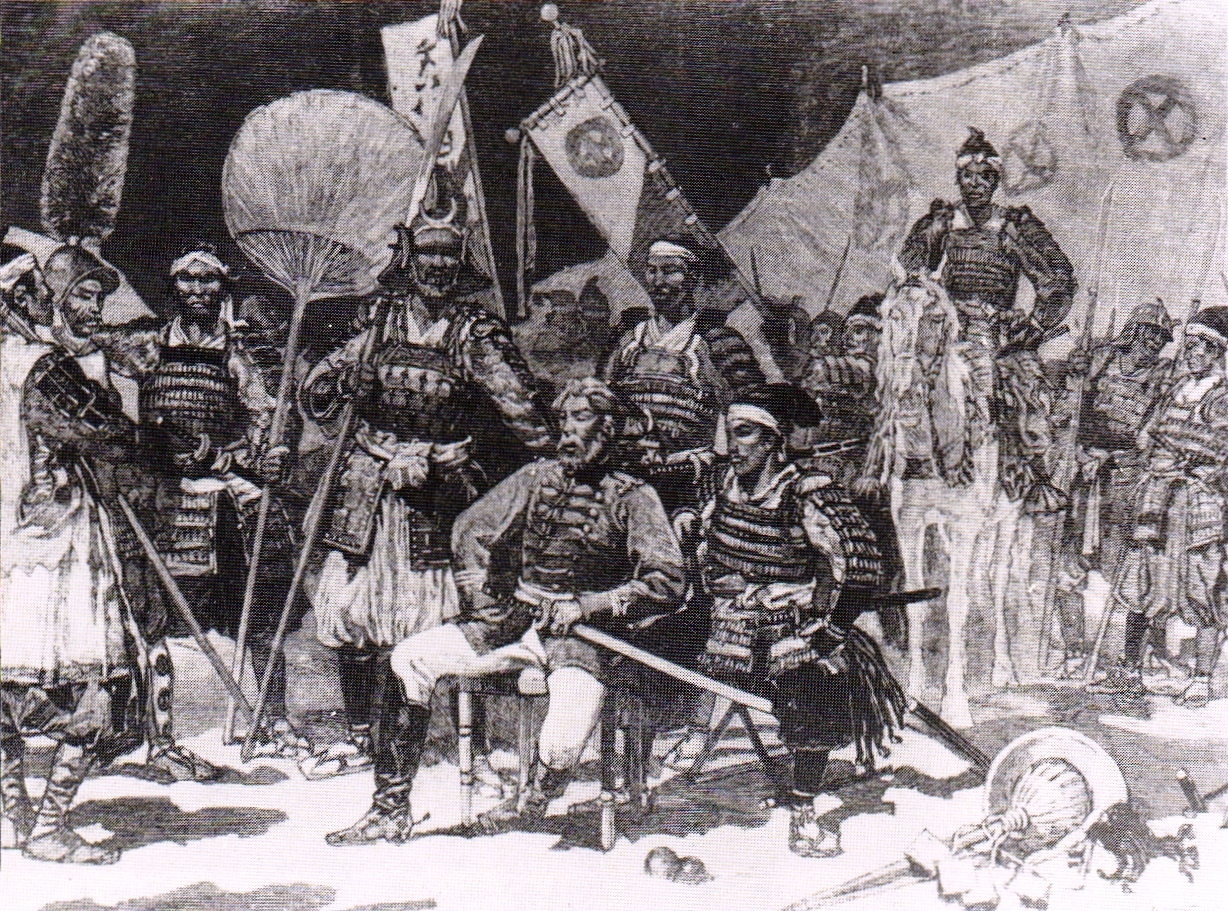
Saigō Takamori (seated, in Western uniform), surrounded by his officers, in samurai attire. News article in Le Monde illustré, 1877.

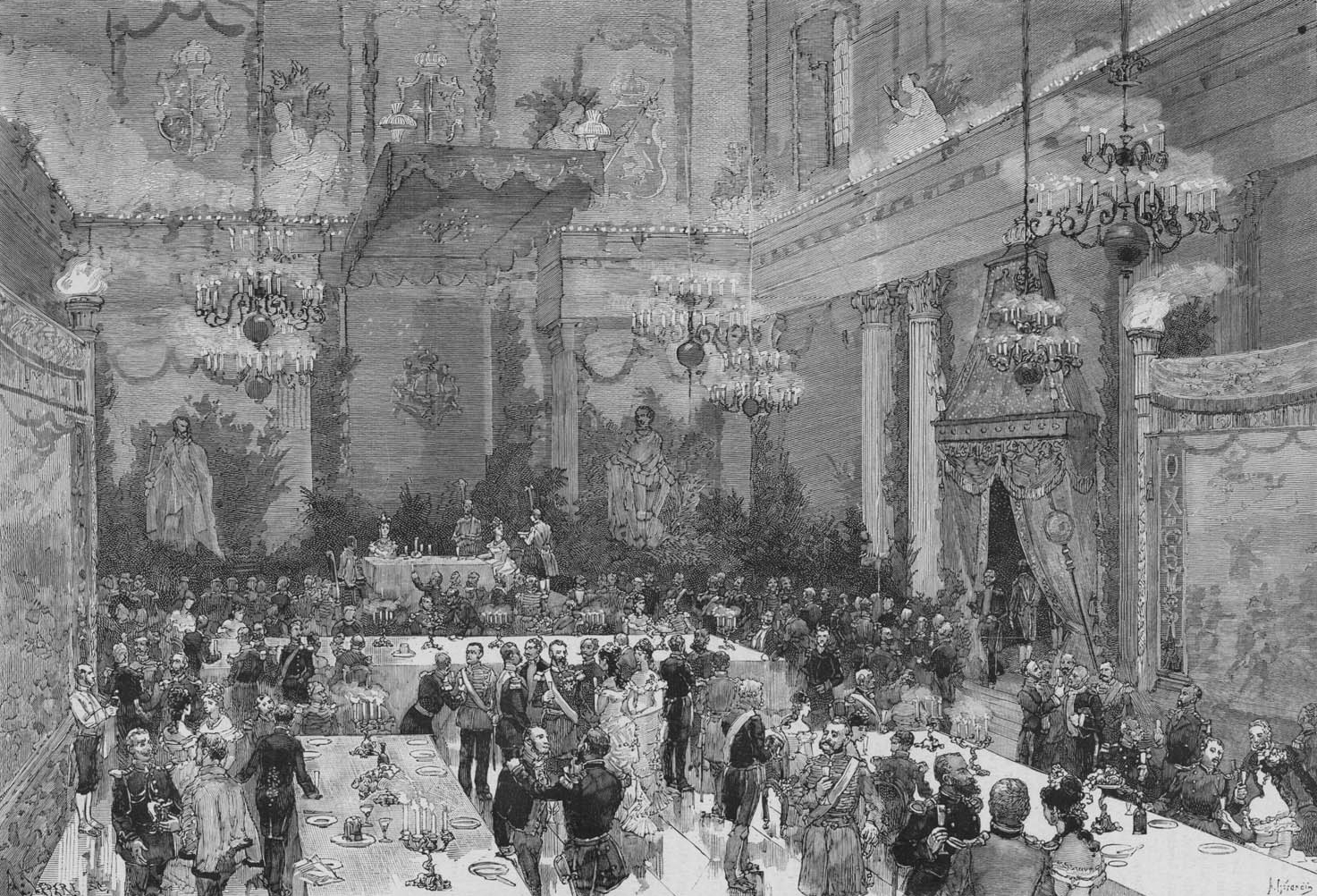
Wedding of Crown Prince Gustaf of Sweden 1881

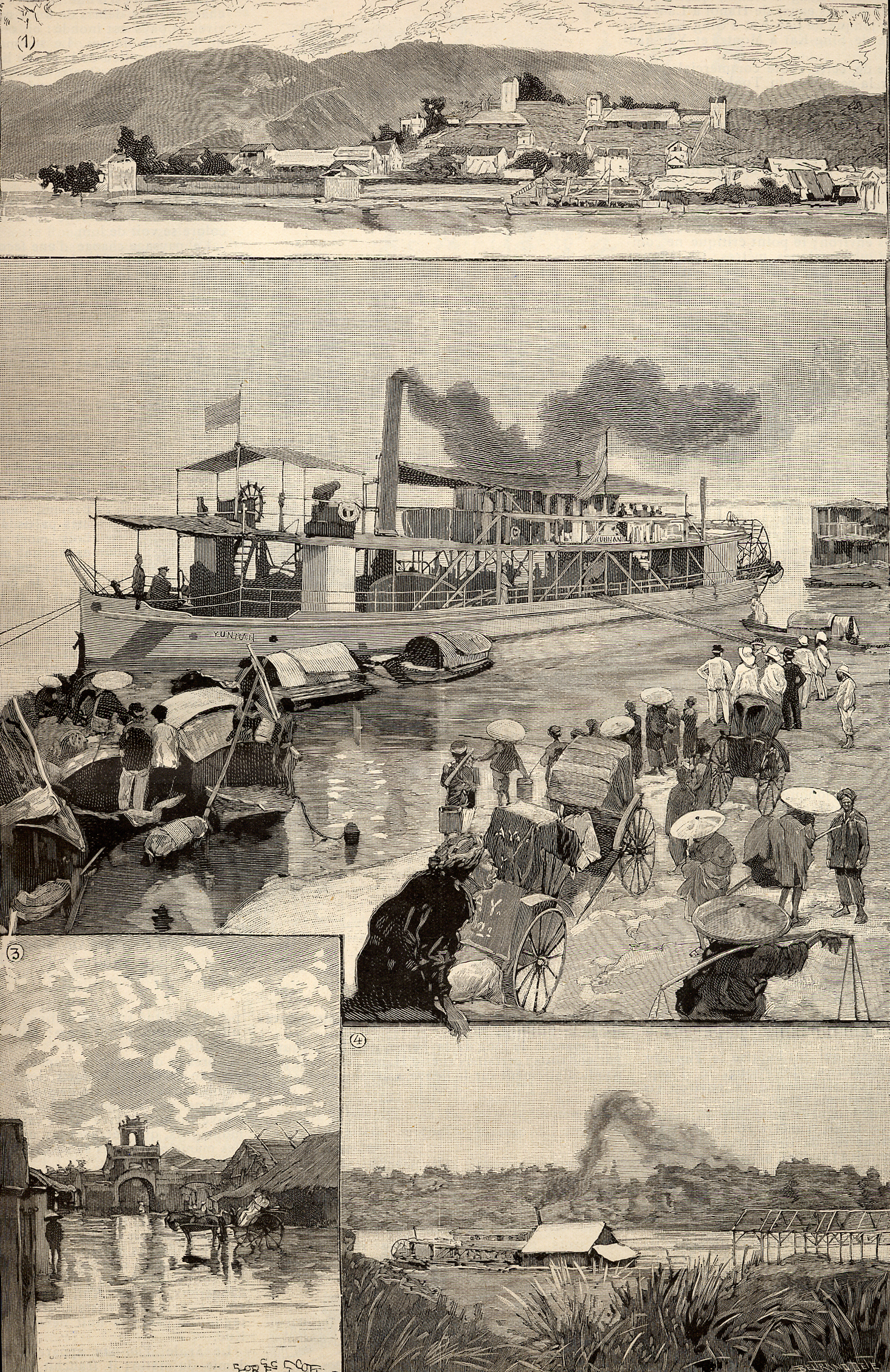
French colonies in 1891.
1. Panorama of Lac-Kaï, French outpost in China.
2. Yun-nan, in the quay of Hanoi.
3. Flooded street of Hanoi.
4. Landing stage of Hanoi
