= Shōgitai =

Tokugawa shogunate shock infantry

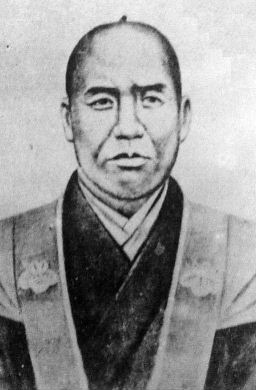
Amano Hachirō, founder of the Shōgitai

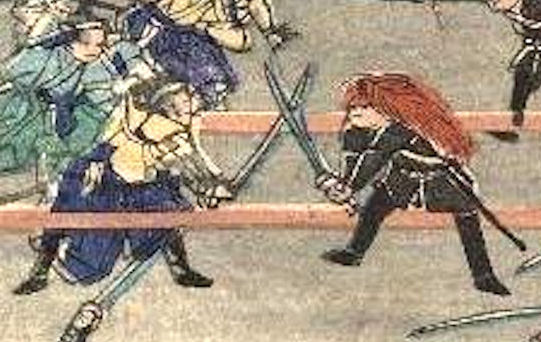
Duel between a Shōgitai (left) and a Shaguma-wearing Jinshotai (迅衝隊) (right) in the Battle of Ueno

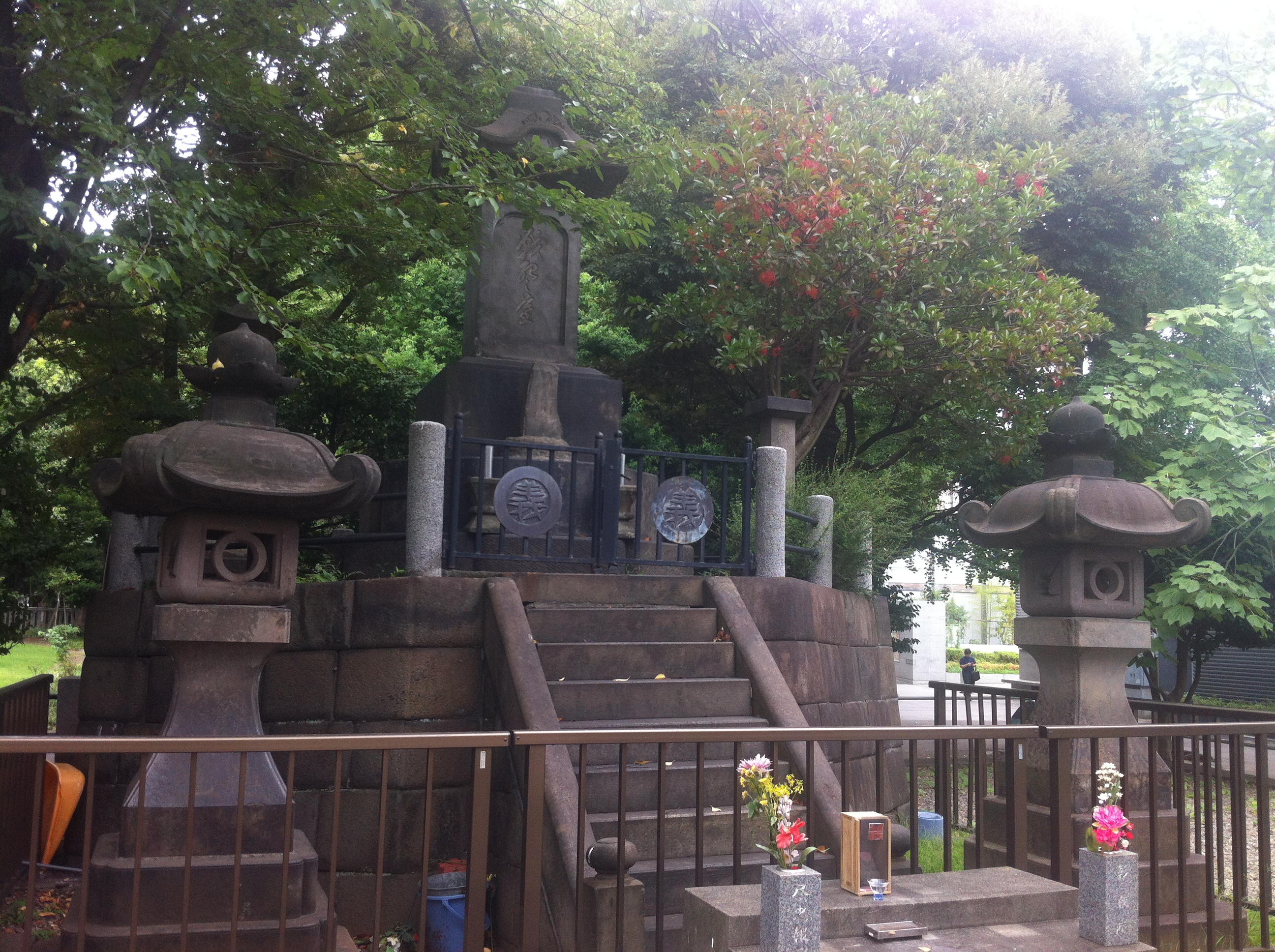
Funeral monument to the Shōgitai in Ueno Park, erected by former Shōgitai warrior Ogawa Okisato in 1874

The Shōgitai (彰義隊, "Manifest Righteousness Regiment") was an elite samurai shock infantry formation of the Tokugawa shogunate military formed in 1868 by the hatamoto Amano Hachirō and Hitotsubashi Gosankyō retainer Shibusawa Seiichirō in Zōshigaya, Edo (now Tokyo). The Shōgitai took a large part in the battles of the Boshin War, especially at the Battle of Toba–Fushimi, and, after being assigned the defence of Kan'ei-ji temple, the Battle of Ueno, where they were nearly annihilated.

After the Battle of Ueno, some surviving Shōgitai fled north, eventually joining the rebels of the Ezo Republic. Following the defeat of Ezo, most of the few remaining former Shōgitai settled in Hokkaido as tondenhei. Among the survivors was Toyohara Chikanobu, who later achieved fame as a master nishiki-e artist.
