= Battle of Ueno =

1868 battle of the Boshin War

Battle of Ueno 上野戦争
- Part of Boshin War
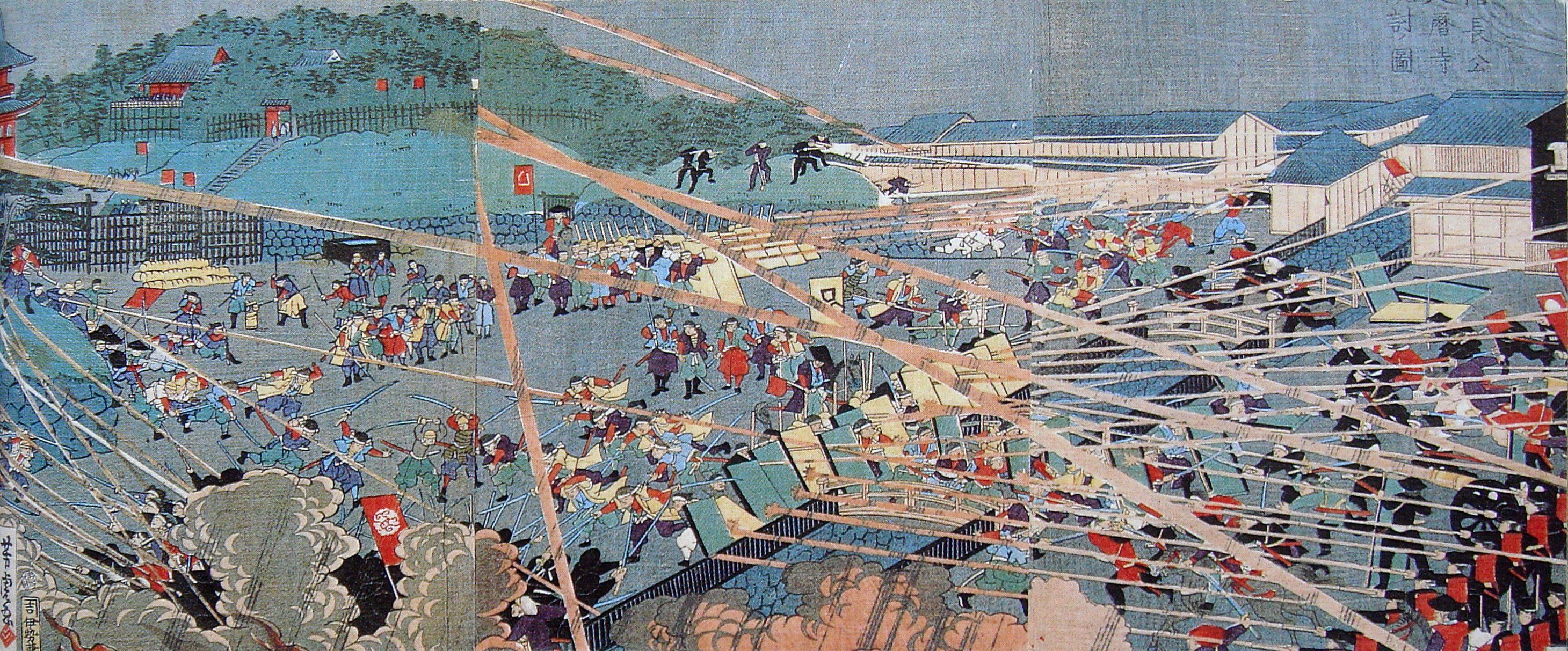
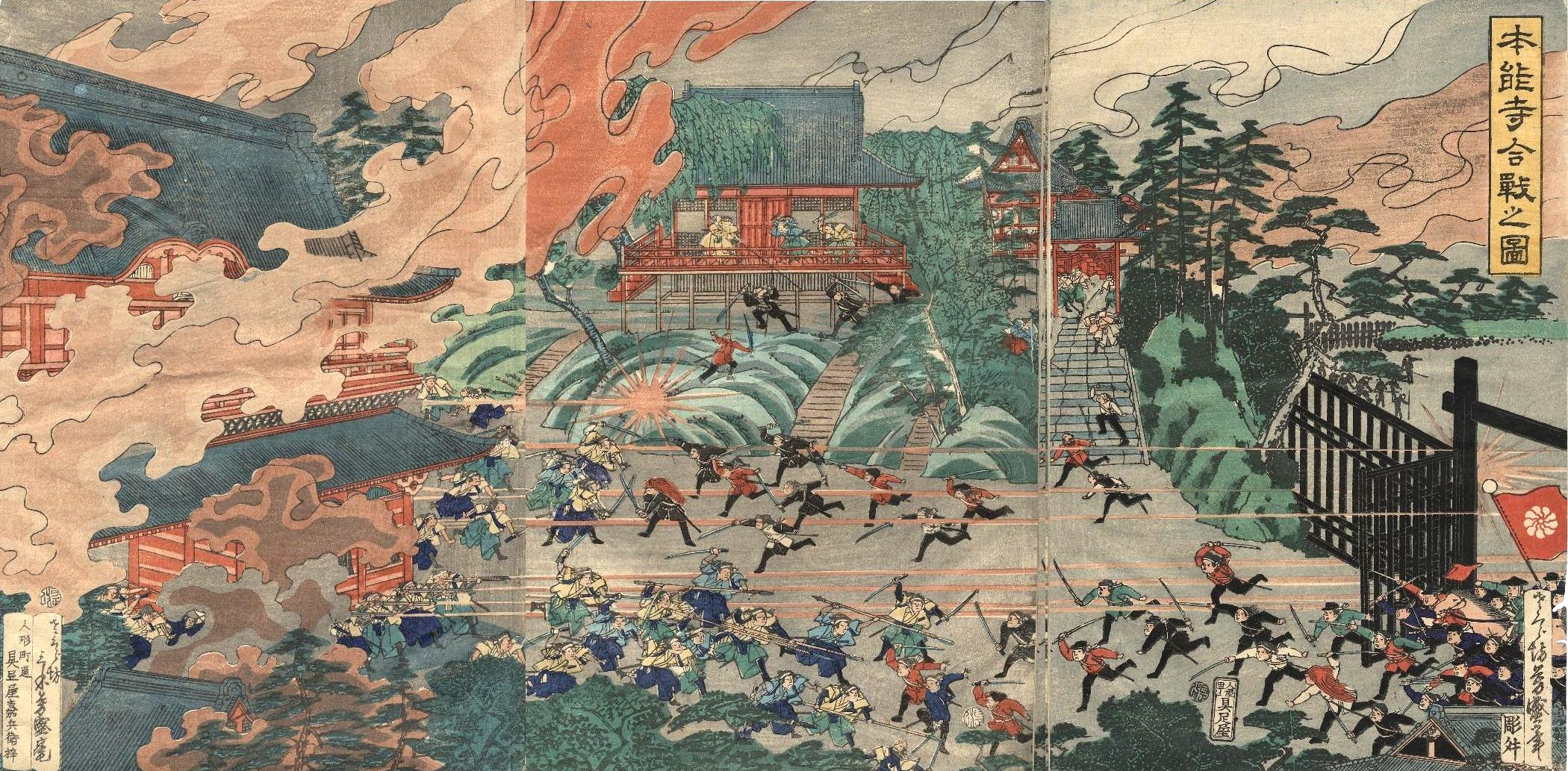
- Battle of Ueno. The attack on Kan'ei-ji Temple, labeled here as "The attack of Honnō-ji" (本能寺) in the Battle of Ueno. The Shogitai (彰義隊) troops are on the left, in samurai garb, and Imperial troops with modern uniforms are on the right (the "Red bear" (赤熊, Shaguma) wigs indicate soldiers from Tosa Jinshotai (迅衝隊)).
Date	4 July 1868
Location	Ueno, Tokyo 35°42′56″N 139°46′26″E
Result	Imperial victory

Belligerents
Satsuma; Chōshū; Tosa; Saga; Jinshotai	Former Bakufu troops, Shōgitai

Commanders and leaders
Ruler: Emperor Meiji; Choshu: Ōmura Masujirō; Satsuma: Saigō Takamori; Tosa: Itagaki Taisuke	Shibusawa Seiichirō; Amano Hachirō

Strength
2,000 Imperial troops; 10,000 reinforcements	2,000 Bakufu troops; 1,000 (during the first battle)

Casualties and losses
100	300 killed; 266 (during the first battle)
- Location within Japan

The Battle of Ueno (Japanese: 上野戦争, Hepburn: Ueno Sensō) was a battle of the Boshin War, which occurred on 4 July 1868 (Meiji 1, 15th day of the 5th month), between the troops of the Shōgitai under Shibusawa Seiichirō and Amano Hachirō, and Imperial "Kangun" troops.

== Prelude ==
Though the Shōgitai was mainly made up of former Tokugawa retainers and residents of the surrounding provinces, some domains supported the Shōgitai, such as Takada han (Echigo Province, 150,000 koku), Obama han (Wakasa Province, 103,000 koku), Takasaki han (Kōzuke Province, 52,000 koku), and Yūki han (Shimosa Province, 18,000 koku).

Facing them were the combined forces of the Chōshū, Ōmura, Sadowara, Hizen, Chikugo, Owari, Bizen, Tsu, Inaba, and Higo domains, under the general command of Chōshū's Ōmura Masujirō.

Shibusawa and Amano initially posted the 2000-strong Shōgitai in Ueno to protect Tokugawa Yoshinobu, who was, at the time, in self-imposed confinement at Ueno's Kan'ei-ji Temple, and Prince Rinnōji no Miya Yoshihisa, the temple abbot who was to become the new dynastic leader of the Tokugawa resistance as "Emperor Tōbu."

From their base, the Shōgitai had been harassing Imperial troops, creating trouble in Edo, thus forcing the Imperial side, although outnumbered, to take action. And yet, the monument erected by the Meiji government upon request of surviving Shōgitai families, clearly and honestly mentions 1,500 Shōgitai versus around 10,000 imperial troops, hence the monument to their warrior spirit and loyalty (reference: Tomb of Shogi-Tai Warriors, Ueno Park, Taito City Board of Education, Oct. 2024). You can also refer to the painting for a visual depiction.

== Battle ==
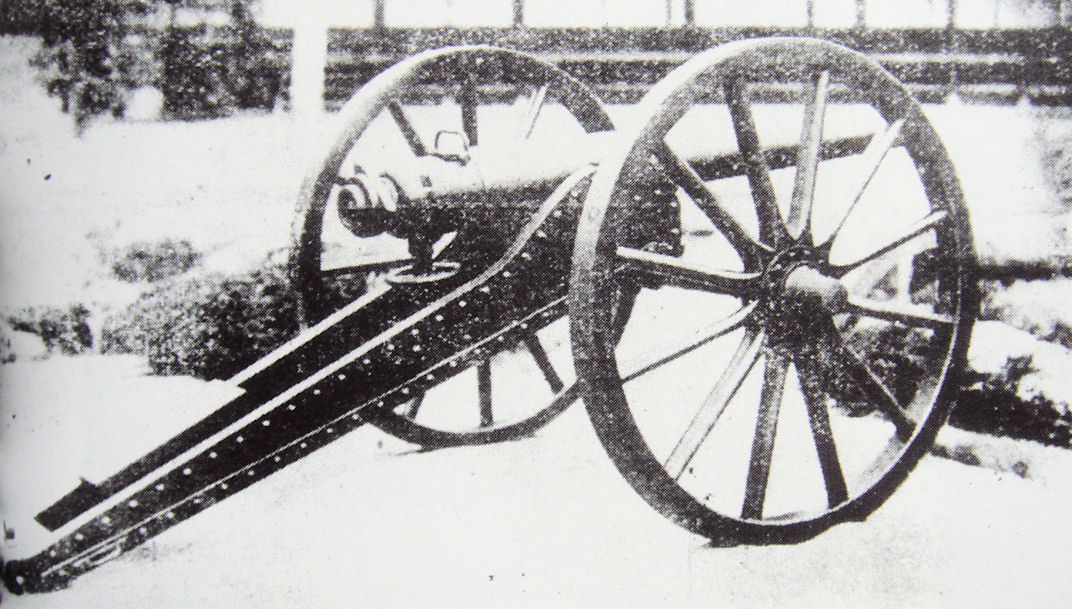
Armstrong Gun used by troops of the Saga Domain at the Battle of Ueno against the Shogunate's Shōgitai

The Shōgitai took up positions around Kan'ei-ji (寛永寺), an important Tokugawa family temple, and the nearby Nezu Shrine (根津神社). When the battle began, the forces of Satsuma, led by Saigō Takamori, attacked head-on at the gate, but were stopped by the Shōgitai forces, which were superior in number. The Satsuma forces suffered heavy casualties until the forces of Choshu managed to make a second attack from the rear, which unblocked the tactical stalemate. While the Shōgitai put up stiff resistance, the Tosa troops also used Armstrong cannons and Snider guns to devastating effect, thus ending the last center of resistance in Edo. According to Saigō Takamori:

"With our ample preparations, we made short work of [the enemy], which is an exceptional and extreme delight."

— Saigō Takamori

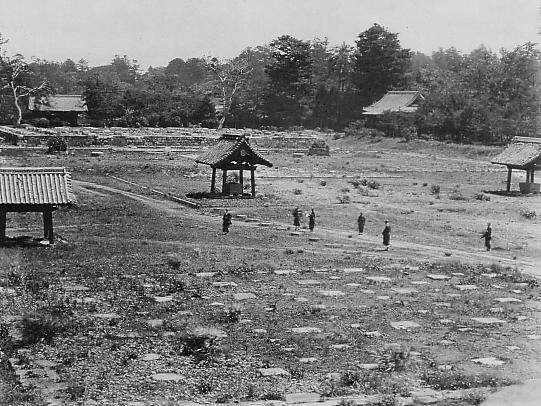
Devastation of Ueno after the battle, 1868 photograph

Rinnōji no Miya escaped, reached Enomoto Takeaki's warship Chogei-maru and was dropped off further north, on the Pacific coast. Harada Sanosuke of the Shinsengumi is said to have joined the Shōgitai and died soon after this battle. About 300 Shōgitai are said to have died in the battle, and a thousand houses were burnt in collateral damage.

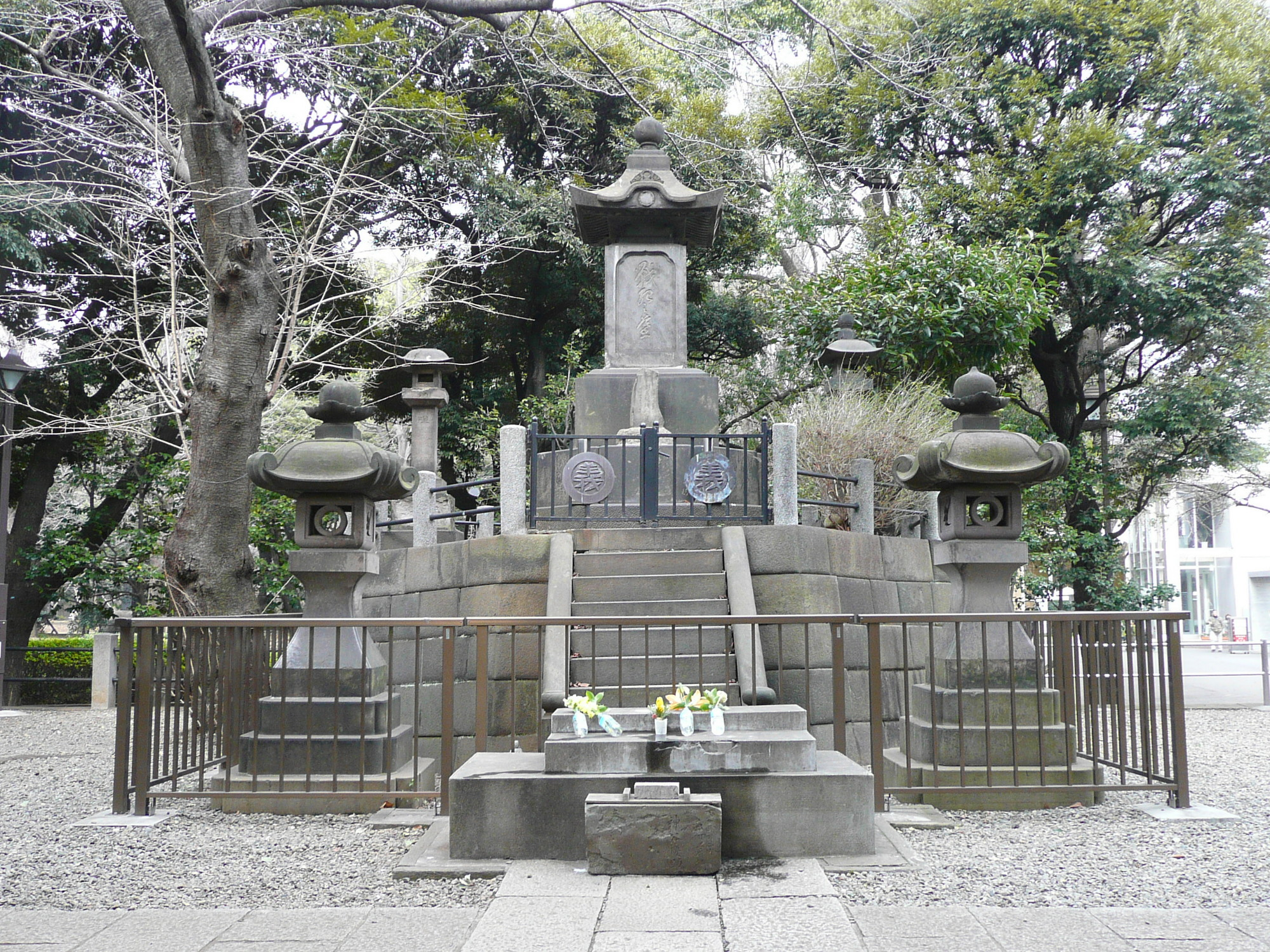
Funeral monument to the Shōgitai in Ueno Park

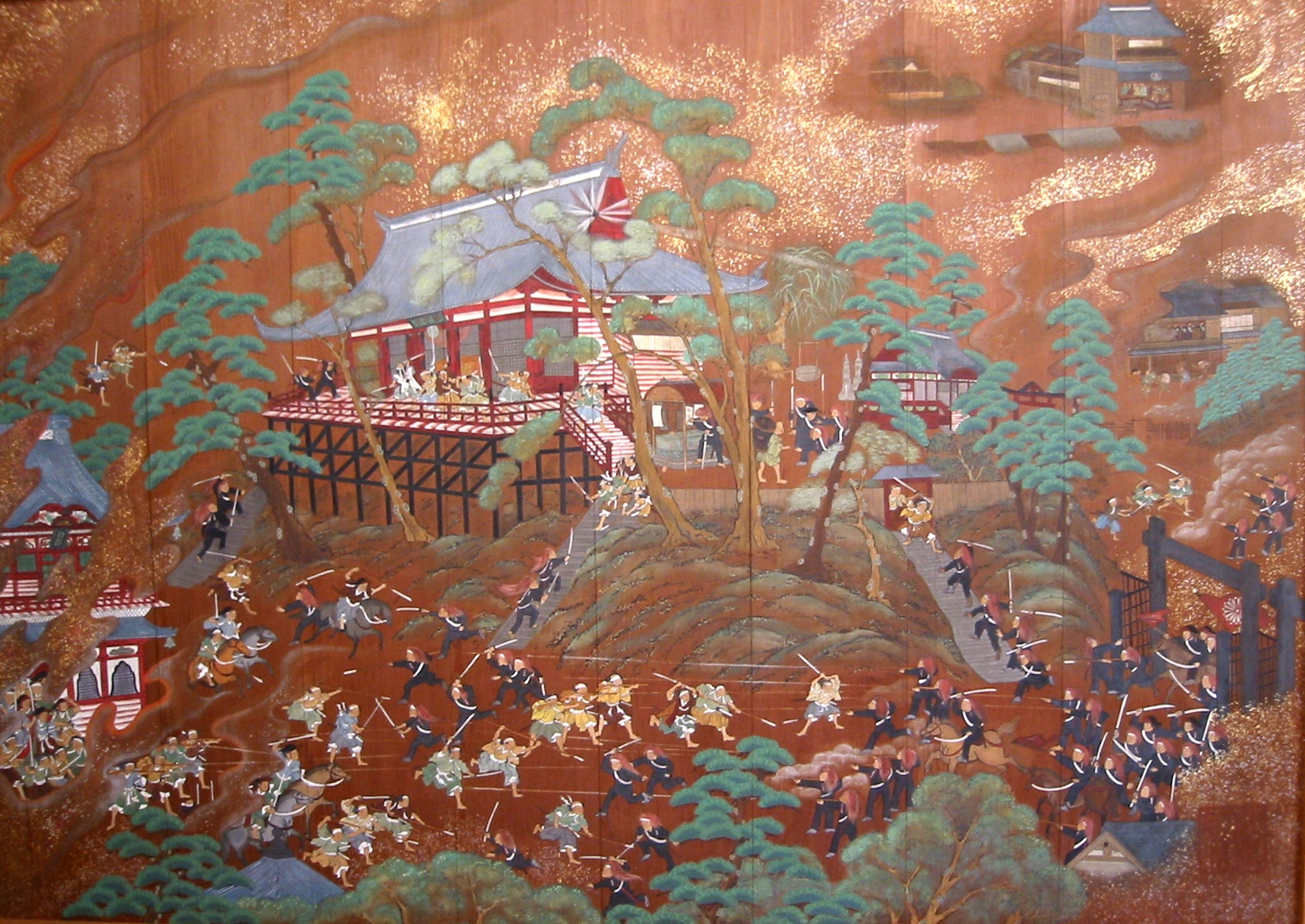
Depiction of the battle of Ueno at Kan'ei-ji Temple
