= Shaguma =

Japanese military headgear

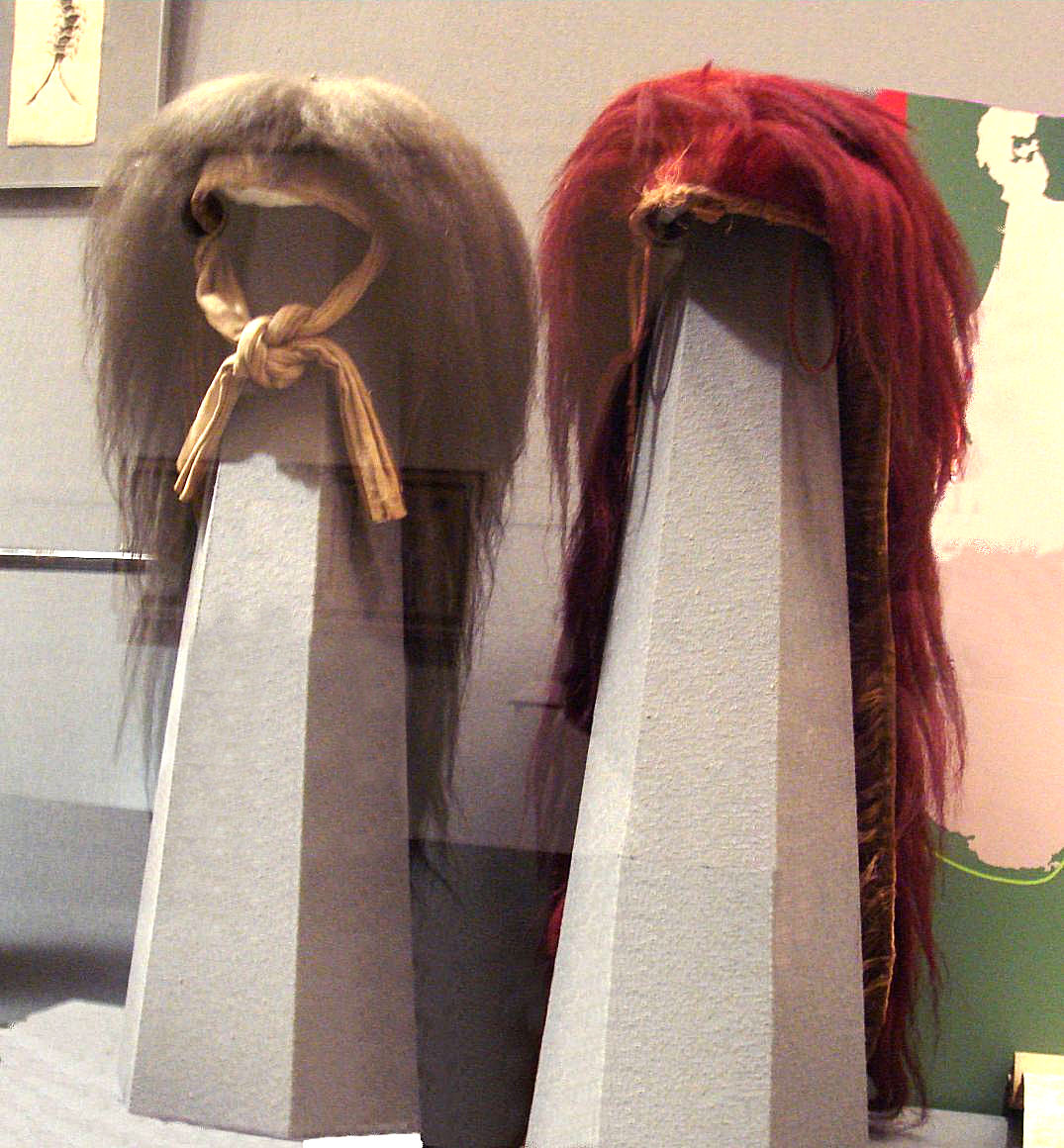
Haguma (left) and shaguma (right) headdress

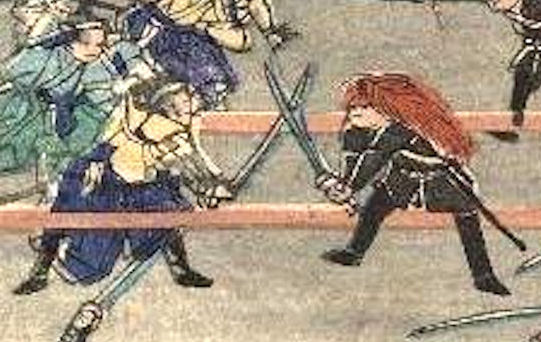
Duel between a shōgitai and shaguma-wearing jinshotai (迅衝隊) at the Battle of Ueno

The shaguma (赤熊, "red bear") was a type of headgear worn by the officers of the Imperial Japanese Army troops in the Boshin War (1868–69). The headgear was composed of long, dyed yak hair and held in place by a chin-strap.

Shaguma indicated officers from the Tosa Domain, whereas haguma (白熊, "white bear") indicated officers from the Chōshū Domain, and koguma (黒熊, "black bear") indicated officers from the Satsuma Domain, respectively. However, the elite jinshotai corps of Tosa were known to have worn the shaguma as well.

Today, headgear similar to the historical shaguma is also worn during processions such as the Gion Festival. Such headgear is sometimes thought to have been inspired by the "red hair" of the Dutch merchants who landed in Nagasaki during the time of sakoku.
