= Yamauchi Toyonori =

Marquis Yamauchi Toyonori
- 山内豊範
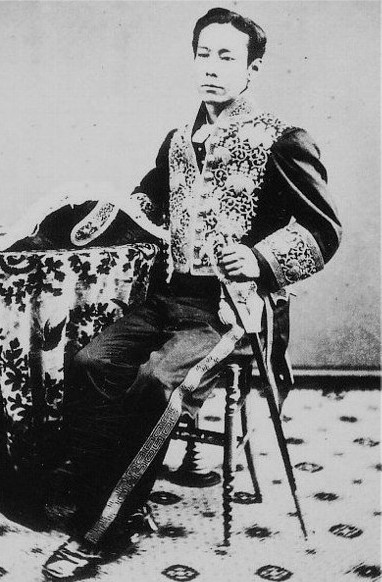
- Yamauchi Toyonori, post-Meiji restoration

16th Daimyō of Tosa Domain
- In office 1859–1868
- Monarchs: Shōgun: Tokugawa Iemochi; Tokugawa Yoshinobu
- Preceded by: Yamauchi Toyonobu
- Succeeded by: < position abolished >

Imperial Governor of Kōchi
- In office 1869–1871
- Monarch: Emperor Meiji

Personal details
- Born: May 12, 1846
- Died: July 13, 1886 (aged 40)
- Spouse(s): daughter of Mōri Narihiro of Choshu daughter of Uesugi Narinori of Yonezawa
- Parent: Yamauchi Toyoshige (father)

Marquis Yamauchi Toyonori (山内豊範; May 12, 1846 – July 13, 1886) was the 16th and final daimyō of Tosa Domain in Shikoku, Japan (modern-day Kōchi Prefecture). Before the Meiji Restoration, his courtesy title was Sakone-no-shosho, and his Court rank was Junior Fourth Rank, Lower Grade.

== Biography ==
Yamauchi Toyonori was the 14th son of Yamauchi Toyoshige, 12th daimyō of Tosa Domain. In 1848, his elder brothers Yamauchi Toyoteru (13th daimyō) and Yamauchi Toyoatsu (14th daimyō) died of illness within a few months of one another. At the time, Toyonori was only age three, so the clan elders decided to make his elder cousin, Yamauchi Toyoshige the 15th daimyō. Yamauchi Toyoshige (also known as Yamauchi Yōdō) was forced into retirement in 1859 due to the Ansei Purge undertaken by the tairō Ii Naosuke, making Toyonori the 16th daimyō. Yamauchi Yōdō continued to wield political power behind-the-scenes, especially after his ban was officially lifted in 1862, and Toyonori's hope of activity was severely limited. He was sent to Kyoto to guard the Imperial Palace in 1862. In 1869, together with representatives from Satsuma Domain and Chōshū Domain, he officially returned the domain to the control of Emperor Meiji. During the Boshin War, he sought a pardon for his father-in-law Uesugi Narinori of Yonezawa Domain.

After the Meiji Restoration and the abolition of the han system in 1871 he was active in Kochi Prefecture in the development of railroads and banks. He received the peerage title of marquis under the kazoku peerage system in 1884. He died at the age of 41. His eldest son, Yamauchi Toyokage inherited his title, and served in the Imperial Japanese Army during the Russo-Japanese War and subsequently as a member of the House of Peers
