= Yamauchi Toyoshige =

Japanese feudal lord (1827–1872)

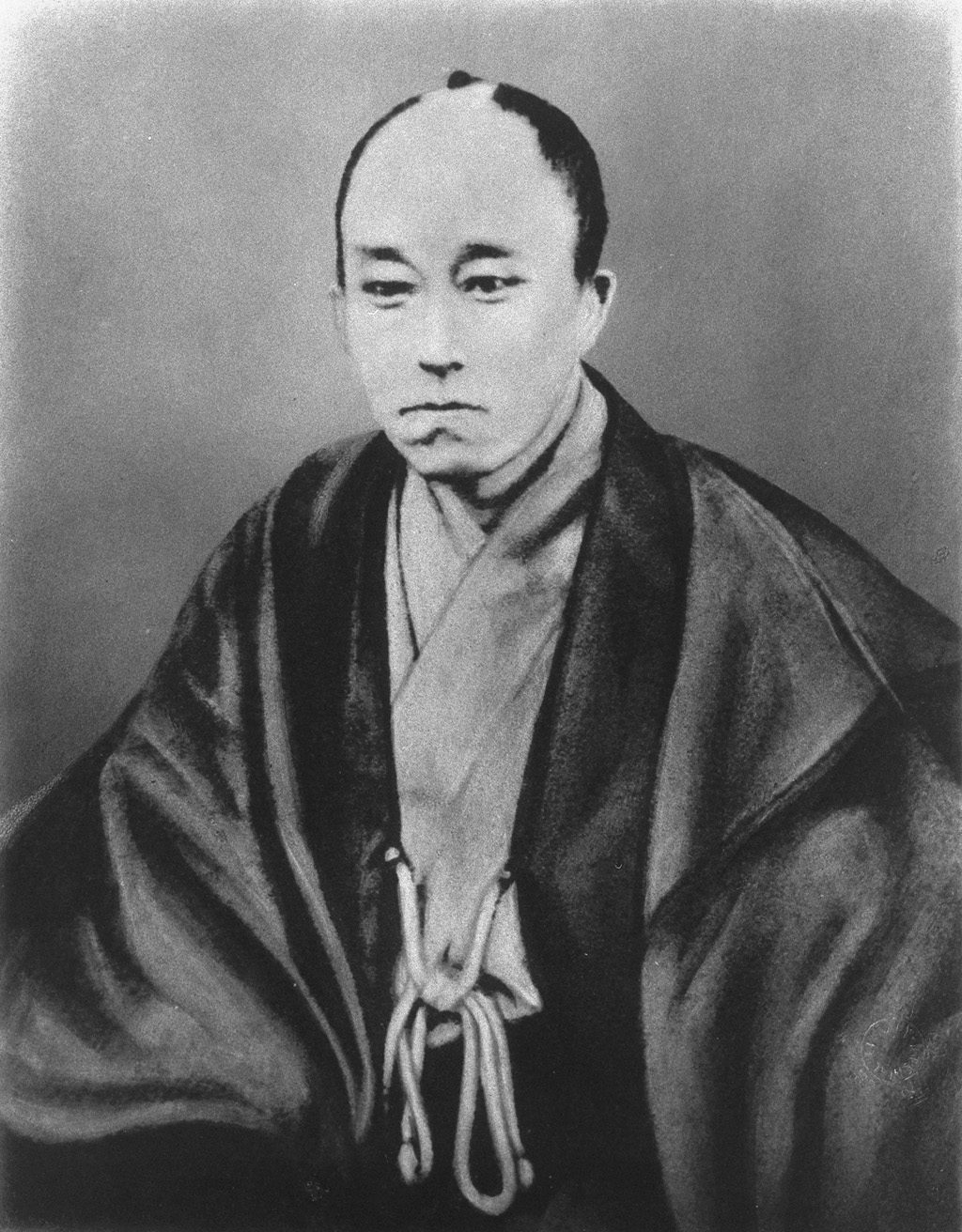
Yamauchi Toyoshige

Yamauchi Toyoshige (山内 豊信; 1827–1872), also known as Yamauchi Yōdō (山内 容堂), was a Japanese daimyō in the Shikoku region in the late Edo period. He was usually referred to as Lord Yōdō in Western accounts.

== Career ==
Yamauchi was the 15th head of the Tosa Domain. He opposed the treaties of the Ansei era. In 1859, he was forced to retire.

In 1862 he was appointed sanyo (参与).

After the assassination of his favourite Yoshida Tōyō in 1862, he ordered an investigation into the local anti-foreigner samurai groups, suspecting them of terrorism. These efforts culminated in the arrest and subsequent suicide of political rogue Takechi Hanpeita, who ordered the hitokiri Okada Izō, in 1865. In 1867 he advised Shōgun Tokugawa Yoshinobu to carry out Taisei Houkan (大政奉還), the return of power to the Emperor, which he carried out later that year.

In 1871, Yamauchi was appointed governor of the new Kochi Prefecture.

| Preceded by Yamauchi Toyoatsu | Daimyō of Tosa; 1848–1859 | Succeeded by Yamauchi Toyonori |

== See also ==
- Ansei purge
