= Tosa Domain =

Administrative division in Japan during the Edo period (1601–1871)

Kōchi Domain (1868–1871) 高知藩 Tosa Domain (1601–1868) 土佐藩
- Domain of Japan
- 1601–1871
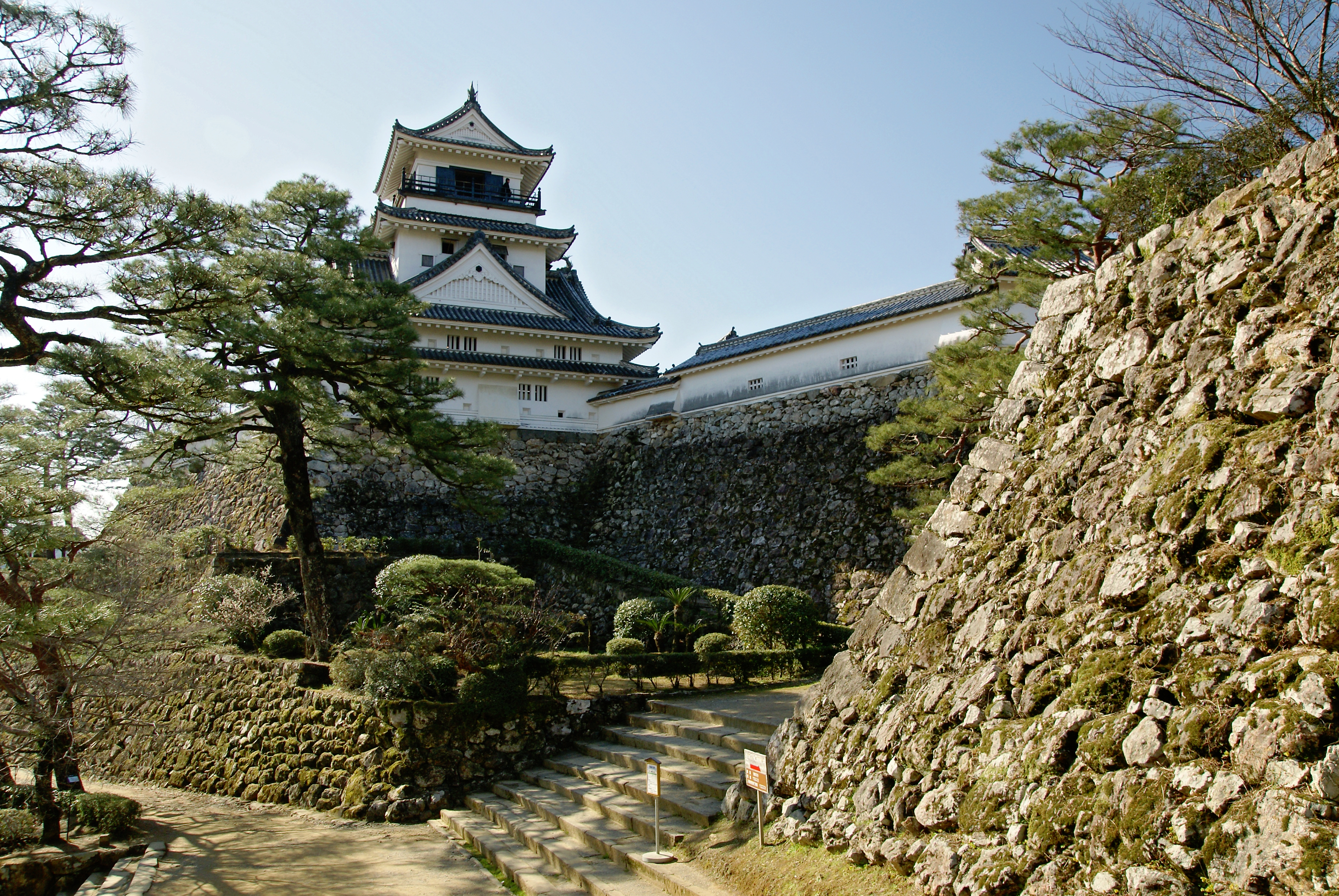
- Kōchi Castle in Kōchi

- Flag (Note: Flag used by the Tosa army during the Boshin War from 1868 to 1869.) Mon of the Yamauchi
- Capital: Kōchi Castle
- Area
  - Coordinates: 36°33′52″N 136°39′33″E
- Government
- Daimyō
  - 1601–1605: Yamauchi Kazutoyo (first)
  - 1859–1871: Yamauchi Toyonori (last)
- Historical era: Edo period
  - Established: 1601
  - Abolition of the han system: 1871
- Contained within
  - Province: Tosa
- Today part of: Kōchi Prefecture

Location of Kōchi Castle
Tosa Domain (Japan)

The Tosa Domain (土佐藩, Tosa-han) was a feudal domain under the Tokugawa shogunate of Edo period Japan, controlling all of Tosa Province in what is now Kōchi Prefecture on the island of Shikoku. It was centered around Kōchi Castle, and was ruled throughout its history by the tozama daimyō Yamauchi clan. Many people from the domain played important roles in events of the late Edo period including Nakahama Manjirō, Sakamoto Ryōma, Yui Mitsue, Gotō Shōjirō, Itagaki Taisuke, Nakae Chōmin, and Takechi Hanpeita. Tosa Domain was renamed Kōchi Domain (高知藩, Kōchi-han) during the early Meiji period until it was dissolved in the abolition of the han system in 1871 and became Kōchi Prefecture.

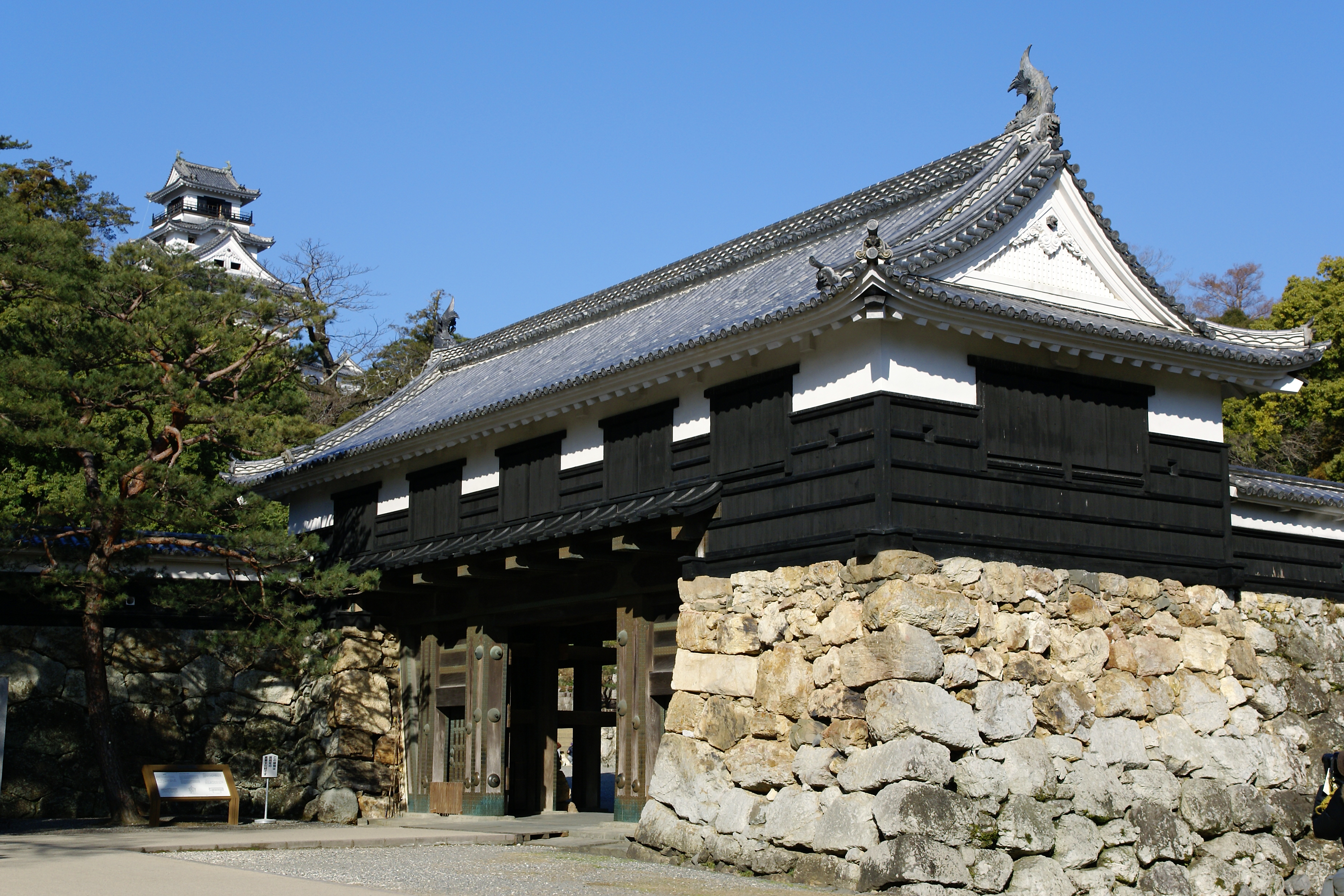
Otemon of Kōchi Castle

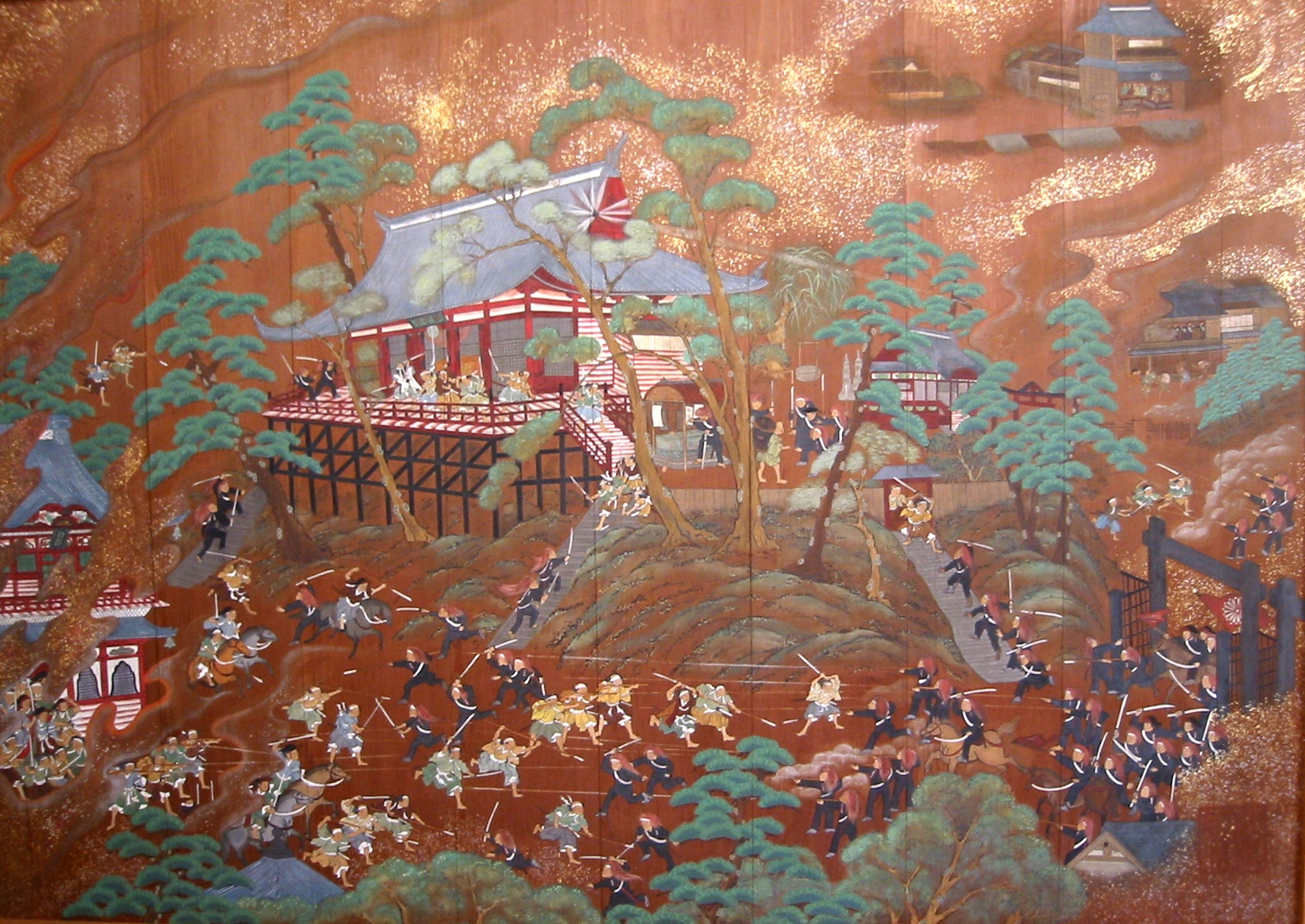
Tosa Jinshotai (迅衝隊) soldiers with Shaguma headress in the Battle of Ueno, Boshin War (1867–68)

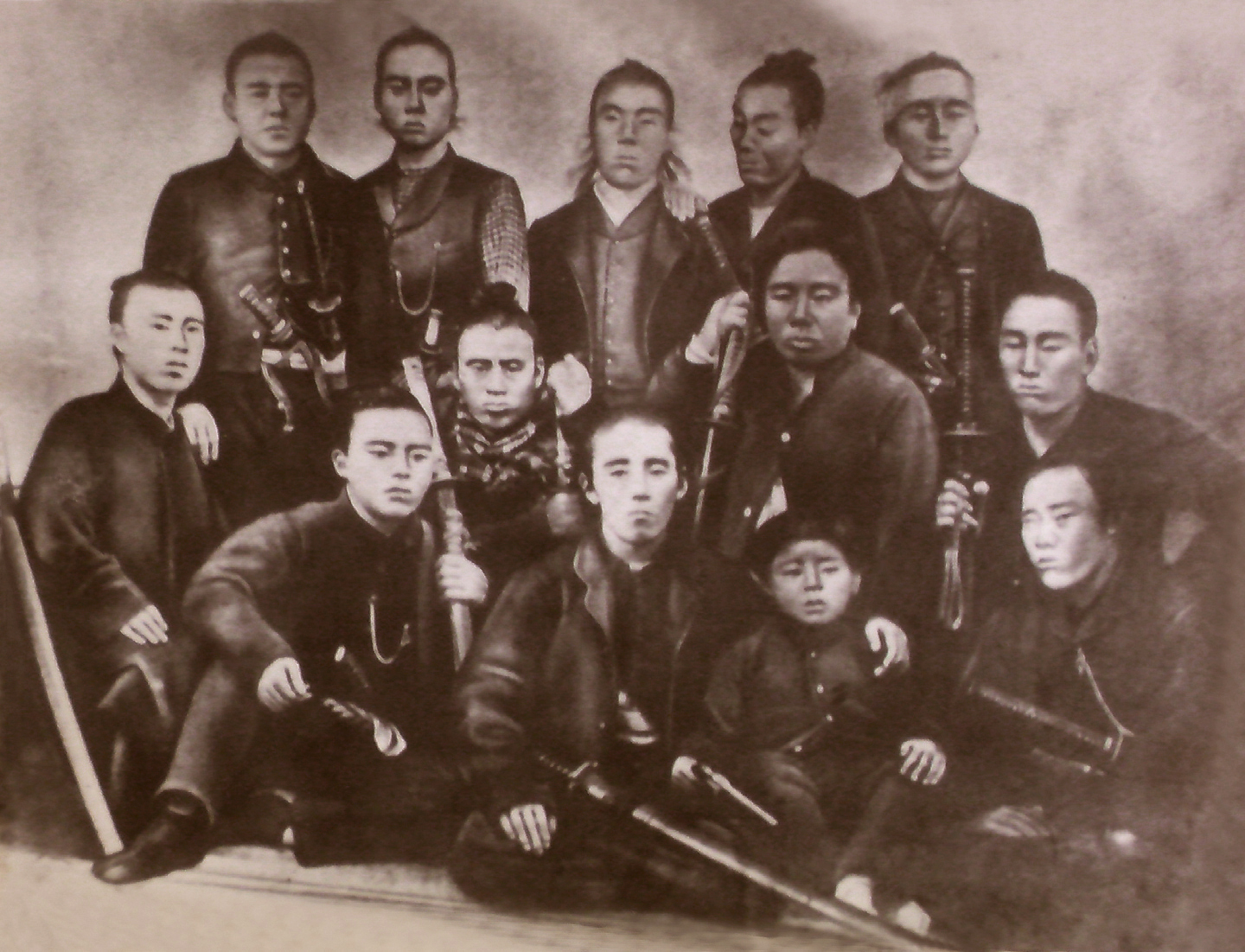
Jinshotai（迅衝隊）(From the left in the bottom row: Ban Gondayu, Itagaki Taisuke, Tani Otoi(young boy), Yamaji Motoharu. From the left in the middle row: Tani Shigeki(Sinbei), Tani Tateki(Moribe), Yamada Kiyokado(Heizaemon), Yoshimoto Sukekatsu(Heinosuke). From the left in the top row: Kataoka Masumitsu(Kenkichi), Manabe Masayoshi(Kaisaku), Nishiyama Sakae, Kitamura Shigeyori(Chobei), Beppu Hikokuro.)

== History ==
At the end of the Sengoku period, the Chōsokabe clan ruled Tosa Province. The Chōsokabe had briefly controlled the entire island of Shikoku under Chōsokabe Motochika from 1583 until he was defeated by Toyotomi Hideyoshi in the Invasion of Shikoku in 1585. Motochika fought for Hideyoshi in the Kyushu Campaign and the invasions of Korea. However, next daimyō Chōsokabe Morichika joined the pro-Toyotomi Western Army at the Battle of Sekigahara in 1600, and was subsequently deprived of his title, and later his life. The victorious Tokugawa shogunate ordered Yamauchi Kazutoyo, lord of Kakegawa Castle in Tōtōmi Province to take control of the province as daimyō of the newly created Tosa Domain, with a nominal kokudaka of 202,600 koku. The Chōsokabe's former retainers were extremely hostile to the new regime, while Tosa peasants feared increased exploitation under the new lord and many fled across to the neighboring domains. Kazutoyo came in with only 158 mounted men, and had to petition the new government of the Tokugawa shogunate for help in pacifying his new domain. This was achieved by "ruse and violence ... Two boatloads containing 273 heads were sent to Tokugawa headquarters to demonstrate Yamauchi efficiency, and another 73 dissidents were crucified on the beach," however, stories that the Yamauchi invited major Chōsokabe retainers to a fake sumo tournament and had them massacred are believed to have been later fabrications.

In any event, most of the old vassals of the Chōsokabe, who were half-peasants and half-soldiers, were allowed to remain as lower-ranked samurai within the new regime, with retainers of the Yamauchi clan monopolizing the senior position, and with the most senior Yamauchi retainers and clan members assisted to key points within the domain to prepare for rebellions. This discrimination between the old and the new retainers would persist during the Bakumatsu period and would be an increasing source of dissatisfaction with the lower-ranking samurai.

Initially, Yamauchi Kazutoyo made Urato Castle, the old stronghold of the Chōsokabe as his headquarters, but he soon found it too small, so he built Kōchi Castle and laid out a new castle town. Under his successor, Yamauchi Tadayoshi, new rice field development and new industries were promoted, and the clan's finances remained relatively stable until around the middle of the Edo period. The domain was always eager to raise its incomes; the expenses involved in its sankin kōtai obligation to live in the shogunate's capital of Edo in alternative years was extremely high due to the domain's geographic location, and the domain was constantly being called upon by the shogunate to provide labor for public works projects.

However, from around the Horeki era (1751 to 1764) onwards, the clan's administration was shaken by uprisings and peasants fleeing to other territories. The ninth daimyō, Yamauchi Toyochika and the 13th daimyō, Yamauchi Toyoteru attempted reforms based on fiscal frugality with limited success. In the Bakumatsu period, the 15th daimyō, Yamauchi Toyoshige (also known as Yamauchi Yodo) appointed Yoshida Tōyō to undertake major reforms; however, he was assassinated by reactionary followers of Takechi Hanpeita who were against modernization. Subsequently, Yamauchi Toyoshige took action against Takechi's "Tosa Kinnō-tō" party and suppressed the Sonnō Jōi movement in the domain. Initially a strong supporter of the Kōbu gattai movement to join the shogunate with the Imperial House of Japan, he later led the domain into the Satchō Alliance and played a critical role in 1867 in advising Shōgun Tokugawa Yoshinobu to carry out Taisei Hokan (大政奉還), and to the return of power to the Emperor. In 1868, Tosa Domain was renamed "Kōchi Domain", which after the abolition of the han system in 1871, became Kōchi Prefecture. The Yamauchi clan was elevated to the rank of marquis in the kazoku system by the Peerage Order of 1884.

== Holdings at the end of the Edo period ==
Unlike most domains in the han system, which consisted of several discontinuous territories calculated to provide the assigned kokudaka, based on periodic cadastral surveys and projected agricultural yields, Tosa Domain was a single unified holding. At the end of the 16th century, the Chōsokabe family's kokudaka of Tosa Province was only 98,000 koku per the Taiko land survey. The Yamauchi clan had an official kokudaka of 202,600 koku, but when the rival Tokushima Domain gained Awaji Province in 1615 and raised its kokudaka from 170,000 to 257,000 koku, Tosa Domain also demanded that its kokudaka be reassessed as 257,000 koku, so that it would not lose prestige and be considered inferior to Tokushima. The shogunate refused the demand and Tosa Domain remained at 202,600 koku. However, this was an official, nominal, value, and the actual kokudaka of the domain is estimated to have been at least 494,000 koku.

- Tosa Province (entire province)
  - 47 villages in Aki District
  - 30 villages in Kami District
  - 38 villages in Nagaoka District
  - 23 villages in Tosa District
  - 40 villages in Agawa District
  - 61 villages in Takaoka District
  - 109 villages in Hata District

== List of daimyō ==
#	Name	Tenure	Courtesy title	Court Rank	kokudaka
Yamauchi clan, 1601–1871 (Tozama)
1	Yamauchi Kazutoyo (山内一豊)	1601–1605	Tosa-no-kami (土佐守)	Junior 4th Rank, Lower Grade (従四位下)	202,600 koku
2	Yamauchi Tadayoshi (山内忠義)	1605–1656	Tosa-no-kami (土佐守); Jijū (侍従)	Junior 4th Rank, Lower Grade (従四位下)	202,600 koku
3	Yamauchi Tadatoyo (山内忠豊)	1656–1669	Tsushima-no-kami (対馬守); Jijū (侍従)	Junior 4th Rank, Lower Grade (従四位下)	202,600 koku
4	Yamauchi Toyomasa (山内豊昌)	1669–1700	Tosa-no-kami (土佐守); Jijū (侍従)	Junior 4th Rank, Lower Grade (従四位下)	202,600 koku
5	Yamauchi Toyofusa (山内豊房)	1700–1706	Tosa-no-kami (土佐守); Jijū (侍従)	Junior 4th Rank, Lower Grade (従四位下)	202,600 koku
6	Yamauchi Toyotaka (山内豊隆)	1706–1720	Tosa-no-kami (土佐守); Jijū (侍従)	Junior 4th Rank, Lower Grade (従四位下)	202,600 koku
7	Yamauchi Toyotsune (山内豊常)	1720–1725	Tosa-no-kami (土佐守); Jijū (侍従)	Junior 4th Rank, Lower Grade (従四位下)	202,600 koku
8	Yamauchi Toyonobu (山内豊敷)	1725–1768	Tosa-no-kami (土佐守); Jijū (侍従)	Junior 4th Rank, Lower Grade (従四位下)	202,600 koku
9	Yamauchi Toyochika (山内豊雍)	1768–1789	Tosa-no-kami (土佐守); Jijū (侍従)	Junior 4th Rank, Lower Grade (従四位下)	202,600 koku
10	Yamauchi Toyokazu (山内豊策)	1789–1808	Tosa-no-kami (土佐守); Jijū (侍従)	Junior 4th Rank, Lower Grade (従四位下)	202,600 koku
11	Yamauchi Toyooki (山内豊興)	1808–1809	Tosa-no-kami (土佐守); Jijū (侍従)	Junior 5th Rank, Lower Grade (従五位下)	202,600 koku
12	Yamauchi Toyosuke (山内豊資)	1809–1843	Tosa-no-kami (土佐守); Jijū (侍従), Ukon-no-e-shosho (右近衛少将	Junior 4th Rank, Lower Grade (従五位下)	202,600 koku
13	Yamauchi Toyoteru (山内豊熈)	1843–1848	Tosa-no-kami (土佐守); Jijū (侍従)	Junior 4th Rank, Lower Grade (従四位下)	202,600 koku
14	Yamauchi Toyoatsu (山内豊惇)	1848–1848	Tosa-no-kami (土佐守)	Junior 4th Rank, Lower Grade (従四位下)	202,600 koku
15	Yamauchi Toyoshige (山内豊信)	1848–1859	Gon-Chunagon (権中納言)	2nd Rank (正二位)	202,600 koku
16	Yamauchi Toyonori (山内豊範)	1859–1871	Sakon-no-e-shosho (左近衛権少将)	Junior 4th Rank, Lower Grade (従四位下)	202,600 koku

== Subsidiary domains ==
Tosa Domain had two subsidiary domains:

=== Tosa-Nakamura Domain ===
Tosa-Nakamura Domain (土佐中村藩, Tosa-Nakamura han) was created in 1601 for Yamauchi Yasutoyo, brother of Kazutoyo and father of the 2nd daimyo, Tadayoshi. It had a kokudaka of 20,000 koku. The domain was inherited by his son Masatomo, but went extinct in 1624. The domain was revived in 1658 for Yamauchi Tadayoshi's second son Tadanao, but as a 30,000 koku holding. It was abolished in 1689.

=== Tosa-Shinden Domain ===
Tosa-Shinden Domain (土佐新田藩, Tosa-Shinden han) was created in 1780 as a 13,000 koku holding for Yamauchi Toyotada, from a hatamoto branch of the clan descended from the former daimyō of Tosa-Nakamura Domain. It had kokudaka of 13,000 koku taken directly form the treasury of the parent domain, and thus did not have any physical estates. It was also not subject to sankin kōtai, as its daimyō always resided at the domain's mansion in the Azabu area of Edo. The domain was abolished and reincorporated back into Tosa Domain in 1870.

==== List of daimyō ====
#	Name	Tenure	Courtesy title	Court Rank	kokudaka
Yamauchi clan, 1780–1870 (Tozama)
1	Yamauchi Toyotada (山内豊産)	1780–1783	Tōtōmi-no-kami (遠江守)	Junior 5th Rank, Lower Grade (従五位下)	13,000 koku
2	Yamauchi Toyoyasu (山内豊泰)	1783–1803	Settsu-no-kami (摂津守)	Junior 5th Rank, Lower Grade (従五位下)	13,000 koku
3	Yamauchi Toyotake (山内豊武)	1803–1825	Tōtōmi-no-kami (遠江守)	Junior 5th Rank, Lower Grade (従五位下)	13,000 koku
4	Yamauchi Toyokata (山内豊賢)	1825–1856	Tōtōmi-no-kami (遠江守)	Junior 5th Rank, Lower Grade (従五位下)	13,000 koku
5	Yamauchi Toyoyoshi (山内豊福)	1856–1868	Settsu-no-kami (摂津守)	Junior 5th Rank, Lower Grade (従五位下)	13,000 koku
6	Yamauchi Toyoshige (山内豊誠)	1868–1871	Jijū (侍従)	Junior 5th Rank, Lower Grade (従五位下)	13,000 koku

== Simplified genealogy of the Yamauchi daimyō of Tosa ==
- Yamauchi Moritoyo (1510 – c. 1559)
  - I. Kazutoyo, 1st daimyō of Tosa (cr. 1601) (c. 1545 – 1605; r. 1601–1605)
  - Yasutoyo (1549–1625)
    - II. Tadayoshi, 2nd daimyō of Tosa (1592–1665; r. 1605–1656)
      - III. Tadatoyo, 3rd daimyō of Tosa (1609–1669; r. 1656–1669)
        - IV. Toyomasa, 4th daimyō of Tosa (1641–1700; r. 1669–1700).
    - Fukao Shigemasa (1598–1672). Adopted into the Fukao family
      - Fukao Shigeteru
        - Fukao Shigenao
          - Yamauchi Tadashige (1682–1721)
            - VIII. Toyonobu, 8th daimyō of Tosa (1712–1768; r. 1725–1767)
              - IX. Toyochika, 9th daimyō of Tosa (1750–1789; r. 1768–1789)
                - X. Toyokazu, 10th daimyō of Tosa (1773–1825; r. 1789–1808)
                  - XI. Toyoaki, 11th daimyō of Tosa (1793–1809; r. 1808–1809).
                  - XII. Toyosuke, 12th daimyō of Tosa (1794–1872; r. 1809–1843)
                    - XIII. Toyoteru, 13th daimyō of Tosa (1815–1848; r. 1843–1848)
                    - XIV. Toyoatsu, 14th daimyō of Tosa (1824–1848; r. 1848)
                    - XVI. Toyonori, 16th daimyō, 16th family head, 1st Marquess (1846–1886; r. 1859–1869; Governor of Tosa 1869–1871; Marquess: 1884)
                      - XVII. Toyokage, 2nd Marquess, 17th family head (1875–1957; 2nd Marquess 1886–1947; 17th family head 1886–1957)
                      - Toyoshizu, 1st Baron Yamauchi (cr. 1906) (1883–1937)
                        - XVIII. Toyoaki, 18th family head (1912–2003; 18th family head 1957–2003)
                          - XIX. Toyokoto, 19th family head (b. 1940; 19th family head 2003– )
                            - Toyohiro (b. 1978)
                            - Toyonao (b. 1979)
                  - Toyoakira (1802–1859)
                    - XV. Toyoshige, 15th Lord of Tosa (1827–1872; r. 1849–1859)
    - Kazutada (1600–1663)
      - Kazutoshi (1649–1675)
        - V.Toyofusa, 5th daimyō of Tosa (1672–1706; r. 1700–1706)
        - VI. Toyotaka, 6th daimyō of Tosa (1673–1720; r. 1706–1720)
          - VII. Toyotsune, 7th daimyō of Tosa (1711–1725; r. 1720–1725).

== See also ==
- Abolition of the han system
- Yamauchi Chiyo
- List of Han
- Tosa Yamauchi Family Treasury and Archives
